= Hendrix (surname) =

Hendrix is a patronymic surname of Dutch and Low German origin, meaning "son of Hendrik". Notable people with the surname include:

- Amanda Hendrix (born 1968), American planetary scientist
- Arthur Hendrix (1912–1988), American tennis player
- B. G. Hendrix (1922–2020), American politician
- Bakari Hendrix (born 1977), American basketball player
- Brunhilde Hendrix (1938–1995), German sprinter
- Carisa Hendrix, Canadian magician and fire eater
- Carl Hendrix (1906–1977), Arkansas state politician
- Claude Hendrix (1889–1944), American baseball player
- Clay Hendrix (born 1963), American football coach and player
- Clyde Allen Hendrix (1934–2021), American rockabilly singer and songwriter
- Corey Hendrix, American actor
- David Hendrix (born 1972), American football player
- Dewayne Hendrix (born 1995), American football player
- Dok Hendrix (born 1959), American professional wrestler whose real name is Michael Hayes
- Don Hendrix (1905–1961), American master optician at Mount Wilson Observatory
- Elaine Hendrix (born 1970), American actress
- Emile Hendrix (born 1955), Dutch show jumping rider
- Eugene Russell Hendrix (1847–1927), American Methodist bishop
- Freman Hendrix (born 1950), American politician
- Friedrich Hendrix (1911–1941), German sprinter
- Gary Hendrix, American software businessman
- Grady Hendrix, American author of Horrorstör
- Harville Hendrix (born 1935), American self-help writer
- Henry J. Hendrix (born 1966), United States Navy officer
- Howard V. Hendrix (born 1959), American writer
- J. C. Hendrix (1926–1963), American stock car racing driver
- James R. Hendrix (1925–2002), American soldier
- James Wesley Hendrix (born 1977), American attorney
- Jan Hendrix (born 1949), Dutch-born Mexican artist and architect
- Jared Hendrix, American politician
- Jesse Hendrix (born 1982), Canadian football player
- Jimi Hendrix (1942–1970), American guitarist, singer, and songwriter
- John Shannon Hendrix (born 1959), American architectural historian and philosopher
- John W. Hendrix (born 1942), United States Army general
- Jorrit Hendrix (born 1995), Dutch footballer
- Joseph C. Hendrix (1853–1904), member of the United States House of Representatives
- Kimberly Hendrix (1969–2015), American fashion designer
- Leon Hendrix (born 1948), American painter, songwriter, and musician, brother of Jimi
- Leslie Hendrix (born 1960), American actress
- Manny Hendrix (born 1964), American football player
- Matt Hendrix (born 1981), American golfer
- Michael Hendrix (born c. 1972), American graphic designer and entrepreneur
- Margie Hendrix (1937–1973), American R&B singer
- Neal Hendrix (born 1973), American skateboarder
- Patti Hendrix, American soul singer
- Paul F. Hendrix (born 1950s), American ecologist
- Richard Hendrix (born 1986), American basketball player
- Roger W. Hendrix (1943–2017), American microbiologist
- Ryan Hendrix (born 1994), American baseball player
- Taeler Hendrix (born 1989), American professional wrestler
- Terri Hendrix (born 1968), American singer-songwriter
- Wanda Hendrix (1928–1981), American actress

== Fictional characters ==
- Rebecca Hendrix, from Law & Order: Special Victims Unit

== See also ==
- Hendric
- Hendrick (surname)
- Hendricks (surname)
- Hendrickx
- Hendrik (given name)
- Hendriks
- Hendrikse
- Hendrikx
- Hendrix (disambiguation)
- Hendryx
- Henrik
- Henry (disambiguation)
- Henryk (disambiguation)
- Category:Jimi Hendrix
