= Henrik =

- Pronunciation: Swedish: [ˈhɛ̌nːrɪk] Danish: [ˈhenˀʁek]
- Gender: Male

Origin
- Origin: Swedish (Earliest documented use)
- Meaning: Henry

Other names
- Related names: Henry, Henri, Heinrich, Heiki, Heikki, Heinz, Henryk, Heiko, Heike, Enrique, Henrique, Indrek, Enrico, Henrike, Henrietta, Harriet

Henrik is a male given name of Germanic origin, primarily used in Scandinavia, Finland, Estonia, Hungary and Slovenia. In Poland, the name is spelt Henryk but pronounced similarly. Equivalents in other languages are Henry (English), Heiki (Estonian), Heikki (Finnish), Henryk (Polish), Hendrik (Dutch and Estonian), Heinrich (German), Enrico (Italian), Henri (French), Enrique (Spanish) and Henrique (Portuguese). It means 'Ruler of the home' or 'Lord of the house'.

Notable people named Henrik include:

- Henrik, Prince Consort of Denmark (1934–2018)
- Prince Henrik of Denmark (born 2009)
- Henrik Agerbeck (born 1956), Danish footballer
- Henrik Andersson (badminton) (born 1977), Swedish player
- Henrik Bellman (born 1999), Swedish footballer
- Henrik Bull (disambiguation), several people
- Henrik Castegren (born 1996), Swedish footballer
- Henrik Christiansen (disambiguation), several people
- Henrik Dagård (born 1969), Swedish decathlete
- Henrik Dam (1895–1976), Danish biochemist, physiologist and Nobel laureate
- Henrik Dettmann (born 1958), Finnish basketball coach
- Henrik Otto Donner (1939–2013), Finnish composer and musician
- Henrik Ekman (born 1951), Swedish author and television presenter
- Henrik Falchener (born 2003), Norwegian footballer
- Henrik Fisker (born 1963), Danish automobile designer and entrepreneur
- Henrik Frederiksen (born 1943/44), Danish businessman and car collector
- Henrik Freischlader (born 1982), German blues musician
- Henrik Grönvold (1858–1940), Danish naturalist and artist
- Henrik Gyllenram, Swedish military leader and politician
- Henrik Hagtvedt (born 1971), Norwegian visual artist
- Henrik Hansen (disambiguation), several people
- Henrik Hietakari (1894–1946), Finnish long-distance runner
- Henrik Holm (disambiguation), several people
- Henrik Horn (1618–1693), Swedish nobleman, field marshal, and admiral
- Henrik Jørgen Schibsted Huitfeldt (1907–1979), Norwegian newspaper editor
- Henrik Ibsen (1828–1906), Norwegian playwright
- Henrik Ingebrigtsen (born 1991), Norwegian middle-distance runner
- Henrik Jæger (1854–1895), Norwegian literary historian, literary critic and playwright
- Henrik Jahre (born 1937), Norwegian politician
- Henrik Jensen (disambiguation), several people
- Henrik Jørgensen (disambiguation), several people
- Henrik Kalmet (born 1986), Estonian actor
- Henrik Kreüger (1882–1953), Swedish engineer
- Henrik Nikolai Krøyer (1799–1870), Danish zoologist
- Henrik Lange (1908–2000), Swedish lieutenant general
- Henrik Larsen (born 1966), Danish football manager, coach and player
- Henrik Sass Larsen (born 1966), Danish politician
- Henrik Larsson (born 1971), Swedish football coach and player
- Henrik Lund (academic) (born 1960), Danish engineer and professor
- Henrik Lund (painter) (1879–1935), Norwegian painter and graphic artist
- Henrik Lundgaard (born 1969), Danish rally driver
- Henrik Lundqvist (born 1982), Swedish ice hockey player
- Henrik Malyan (1925–1988), Armenian film director and writer
- Henrik Melland (born 2005), Norwegian footballer
- Henrik Nádler (1901–1944), Hungarian international footballer
- Henrik Nielsen (disambiguation), several people
- Henrik Nilsson (disambiguation), several people
- Henrik Nissen (1848–1915), Norwegian architect
- Henrik Ojamaa, Estonian football player
- Henrik Olrik (1830–1890), Danish painter, sculptor and applied artist
- Henrik Pedersen, several people
- Henrik Pürg (born 1996), Estonian footballer
- Henrik Ripa (1968–2020), Swedish politician
- Henrik Schück (1855–1947), Swedish literary historian, professor and author
- Henrik Sedin (born 1980), Swedish ice hockey player
- Henrik Shipstead (1881–1960), American politician, US Senator from Minnesota
- Henrik Sørensen (1882–1962), Norwegian painter
- Henrik Stenson (born 1976), Swedish golfer
- Henrik Sundström (born 1964), Swedish tennis player
- Henrik Vuornos (born 1993), Finnish politician
- Henrik Wergeland (1808–1845), Norwegian writer, poet, playwright, polemicist, historian and linguist
- Henrik Wigström (1862–1923), Fabergé workmaster, one of two responsible for almost all the Fabergé imperial Easter eggs
- Henrik Zetterberg (born 1980), Swedish ice hockey player

== See also ==
- Hendric
- Hendrick (disambiguation)
- Hendricks (disambiguation)
- Henrici
- Hendrickx
- Hendrik (disambiguation)
- Hendriks
- Henryk (disambiguation)
- Hendrikx
- Hendrix (disambiguation)
- Hendryx
- Henk
- Heiki
- Henry (disambiguation)
- Henrikh
- Naomi Henrik
