= Hendricks (surname) =

Hendricks is a surname. Notable people with the surname include:

== Arts and entertainment ==
- Barbara Hendricks (born 1948), American soprano
- Belford Hendricks (1909–1977), American composer, pianist, arranger, conductor and record producer.
- Christina Hendricks (born 1975), American actress
- Gay Hendricks (born 1945), American psychologist
- Howard Hendricks (1924–2013), American seminary professor
- Jim Hendricks (1949–2018), American actor
- Jim Hendricks (musician) (born 1940), American musician
- Jon Hendricks (1921–2017), American jazz lyricist and singer
- JPEGMAFIA (born 1989), American rapper and producer, whose real name is Barrington DeVaughn Hendricks

== Politics ==
- Barbara Hendricks (politician) (born 1952), German politician
- Ernest Hendricks, South African politician
- Francis Hendricks (1834–1920), New York politician
- Thomas A. Hendricks (1819–1885), American Vice-President
- William Hendricks (1782–1850), Governor of Indiana, United States senator

== Sports ==
- Ashraf Hendricks (born 1984), South African soccer player
- Carlos Hendricks (born 1983), American football player
- Chase Hendricks (born 2005), American football player
- Clint Hendricks (born 1991), South African cyclist
- Conrad Hendricks (1979–2006), South African soccer player
- Cornal Hendricks (1988–2025), South African rugby union player
- Elrod Hendricks (1940–2005), American baseball player
- Johny Hendricks (born 1983), American wrestler
- Kyle Hendricks (born 1989), American baseball player
- Kyle Hendricks (rugby union) (born 1986), South African rugby union player
- Matt Hendricks (born 1981), American ice hockey player
- Nathan Hendricks (born 2005), South African Paralympic swimmer
- Randy Hendricks (born 1945), American attorney and sports agent
- Reeza Hendricks (born 1989), South African cricketer
- Taylor Hendricks (born 2003), American basketball player
- Ted Hendricks (born 1947), American football player
- Tommy Hendricks (born 1978), American football player

== Others ==
- Anne Hendricks Bass (1941–2020), American investor, documentary filmmaker, philanthropist and art collector
- Diane Hendricks (born 1947), American businesswoman and philanthropist
- Father Hendricks (1846–1906), Dutch missionary
- Jimmy Hendricks (died 2017), American murder victim
- John Allen Hendricks (born 1970), American academic
- John R. Hendricks (1929–2007), Canadian mathematician
- Ken Hendricks (1941–2007), American businessman
- Margo Hendricks (born 1948), American academic
- Michael Hendricks, American psychologist, suicidologist, and an advocate for the LGBT community
- Muhsin Hendricks (1967–2025), South African imam, Islamic scholar and LGBT activist
- Susan Hendricks (born 1973), American CNN presenter
- Vincent F. Hendricks (born 1970), Danish philosopher
- William L. Hendricks (1904–1992), American film producer and charity founder

== See also ==
- Jimi Hendrix
- Hendric
- Hendrick (surname)
- Hendrickx
- Hendrik (disambiguation)
- Hendriks
- Hendrikx
- Hendrix (disambiguation)
- Hendryx
- Henrik
- Henry (disambiguation)
- Henryk (disambiguation)
