= Hendrick (surname) =

Hendrick is a surname. Notable people with the name include:

- Burton J. Hendrick (1858–1936), American historian
- Calvin W. Hendrick (1865–1940), American engineer
- George Hendrick (born 1949), American baseball player
- Harvey Hendrick (1897–1941), American baseball player
- Hendrick Tejonihokarawa (c. 1660 – c. 1735), Mohawk leader, one of the Four Mohawk Kings
- Hendrick Theyanoguin (1692–1755), Mohawk leader usually conflated with Hendrick Tejonihokarawa
- Howard Hendrick (born 1954), American politician
- Jeff Hendrick (born 1992), Irish professional footballer
- John Kerr Hendrick (1849–1921), American politician
- Kenny Hendrick (born 1969), American race car driver
- Mark Hendrick (born 1958), British politician
- Mike Hendrick (1948–2021), English cricketer
- Ray Hendrick (1929–1990), American race car driver
- Rick Hendrick (born 1949), American race car owner
- Ricky Hendrick (1980–2004), American race car driver
- Thomas Augustine Hendrick (1849–1909), American Catholic bishop

== See also ==
- Hendric
- Hendricks (surname)
- Hendrickx
- Hendrik (disambiguation)
- Hendriks
- Hendrikx
- Hendrix (disambiguation)
- Hendryx
- Henrik
- Henry (disambiguation)
- Henryk (given name)
