= Heiki =

Estonian male given name

- Gender: Male
- Language: Estonian
- Name day: 19 January (Estonia)

Origin
- Region of origin: Estonia

Other names
- Related names: Heikki, Hendrik, Henrik, Henri, Heino, Enn, Heiko, Heigo

Heiki is an Estonian masculine given name, variant of Hendrik ("Henry")

People named Heiki include:

- Heiki Arike (1965–2018), politician and major in the Estonian Defence League
- Heiki Ernits (born 1953), caricaturist and film director
- Heiki Hepner (born 1966), politician
- Heiki Kranich (1961–2026), politician
- Heiki Loot (born 1971), state official
- Heiki Nabi (born 1985), wrestler
- Heiki Ohu (1943–2021), rally driver
- Heiki Raudla (born 1949), educator, cartoonist and politician
- Heiki Sarapuu (born 1965), competitive runner
- Heiki Sorge (born 1974), badminton player
- Heiki Valk (born 1959), archaeologist
- Heiki Vilep (born 1960), writer
