= Henryk (given name) =

Henryk ([ˈxɛnrɨk]) is a Polish male given name of Germanic origin. It means 'ruler of the home' or 'lord of the house'. It is pronounced similarly to Henrik, the spelling used in Sweden, Denmark, Norway, Estonia, Hungary and Slovenia.

The most common equivalents in other languages are Henry (English), Heikki (Finnish), Hendrik (Dutch), Heinrich (German), Enrico (Italian), Henri (French), Enrique (Spanish) and Henrique (Portuguese). A longer list can be found here.

== People named Henryk ==
=== Kings, Princes and Nobility of Poland ===
- Henryk Mazowiecki (1368/1370–1392/1393), Polish noble and bishop
- Henryk I Brodaty the Bearded (ca. 1165/70–1238), King of Poland
- Henryk I Jaworski (1292/96-1346)
- Henryk II Pobozny (1196/1207–1241)
- Henryk II Ziębicki (1396–1420)
- Henryk III Biały (1227/1230–1266)
- Henryk III Walezy (1551–1589)
- Henryk III głogowski (1251/60–1309))
- Henryk IV Probus (1258–1290)
- Henryk V Brzuchaty (1248–1296))
- Henryk IX of Lubin (1369–1419/1420))
- Henryk X of Chojnów ((1426–1452))

=== Art ===
- Henryk Chmielewski (comics) (1923–2021), Papcio Chmiel comic artist
- Henryk Gotlib (1890–1966), Polish-born painter, draughtsman, printmaker, and writer, who settled in England after World War II
- Henryk Siemiradzki (1843–1902), Polish painter
- Henryk Stażewski (1894–1988), Polish painter
- Henryk Tomaszewski (mime) (1919–2001), mime artist
- Henryk Tomaszewski (poster artist) (1914–2005), poster artist

=== Education ===
- Henryk Goldszmit, the real name of author, paediatrician, and child pedagogue Janusz Korczak
- Henryk Grossman (1881–1950), Polish-German economist and historian of Jewish descent
- Henryk Lipszyc (born 1941), Polish specialist in Japanese culture and former ambassador to Japan

=== Literature ===
- Henryk M. Broder (born 1946), Polish-born German journalist, author, television personality, and critic of Islam
- Henryk Rzewuski (1791–1866), Polish Romantic-era journalist and novelist
- Henryk Samsonowicz (1930–2021), Polish historian specializing in medieval Poland, prolific writer, and professor of the University of Warsaw
- Henryk Sienkiewicz (1846–1916), Polish author Nobel Prize for Literature laureate 1905

=== Military ===
- Henryk Cybulski (1910–1971), Polish forester and resistance fighter
- Jan Henryk Dąbrowski (1755–1818), Polish general and national hero, one of the principal commanders of French Revolutionary Wars, Kościuszko Uprising, War of the Fourth Coalition and Battle of Trebbia (1799)
- Henryk Dembiński (1791–1864), Polish engineer, traveler and general
- Henryk Dobrzański (1897–1940), Polish soldier, sportsman and partisan
- Henryk Lederman (died 1944), cadet officer of the Polish Army, participant in the Warsaw Ghetto Uprising and the Warsaw Uprising
- Henryk Minkiewicz (1880–1940), Polish socialist politician and General of the Polish Army, murdered in the Katyń massacre
- Henryk Śniegocki (1893–1971), Scout and freedom fighter
- Henryk Sucharski (1898–1946), Polish military officer and a major in the Polish Army
- Henryk Woliński (1901–1986), member of the Polish resistance movement in World War II

=== Music ===
- Henryk Czyż (1923–2003), Polish musician, conductor and teacher
- Henryk Górecki (1933–2010), Polish composer
- Henryk Melcer-Szczawiński (1869–1928), Polish composer, pianist, conductor, and teacher
- Svika Pick (1949-2022), born Henryk Pick, Israeli pop singer, songwriter, composer, and television personality
- Henryk Szeryng (1918–1988), Polish-born violinist
- Henryk Wars (1902–1977), Polish and later an American naturalized citizen pop music composer
- Henryk Wieniawski (1835–1880), Polish composer

=== Politics ===
- Henryk Ehrlich (1882–1942), Polish activist
- Henryk Gołębiewski (born 1942), Polish politician
- Henryk Józewski (1892–1981), Polish visual artist, politician
- Henryk Milcarz (born 1950), Polish politician
- Henryk Sławik (1894–1944), Polish politician, diplomat, and social worker who during World War II helped save 5,000 Hungarian and Polish Jews from Budapest by giving them false Polish passports

=== Science ===
- Henryk Arctowski (1871–1958), Polish scientist, oceanographer and explorer of Antarctica
- Henryk Grabowski (1792–1842), German botanist and pharmacist of Polish heritage
- Henryk Iwaniec (born 1947), Polish American mathematician, professor
- Henryk Jordan (1842–1907), Polish philanthropist, physician and pioneer of physical education in Poland
- Henryk Niewodniczański (1900–1968), Polish physicist
- Henryk Zygalski (1908–1978), Polish mathematician and cryptologist who worked at breaking German Enigma ciphers before and during World War II

=== Sport ===
- Henryk Alszer (1918–1959), Polish football player
- Henryk Apostel (born 1941), Polish international football player
- Henryk Bałuszyński (born 1972), Polish international football player
- Henryk Budzicz (born 1953), Polish sprint canoer
- Henryk Chmielewski (boxer) (1914–1998), Polish boxer who competed in the 1936 Summer Olympics
- Henryk Czapczyk (1922–2010), Warta Poznań football player
- Henryk Glücklich (1945–2014), Polish motorcycle speedway rider
- Henryk Grabowski (athlete) (1929–2012), Polish long jumper
- Henryk Janikowski (born 1954), Polish football player
- Henryk Kasperczak (born 1946), Polish football manager and a football player
- Henryk Kukier (1930–2020), Polish boxer
- Henryk Leliwa-Roycewicz (1898–1990), Polish Olympic silver medallist in Eventing at 1936 Olympics
- Henryk Maculewicz (born 1950), Polish footballer
- Henryk Martyna (1907–1984), Polish international football player
- Henryk Miłoszewicz (1956–2003), Polish international football player
- Henryk Petrich (born 1959), Polish boxer
- Henryk Reyman (1897–1963), attacking soccer player, sports official and military officer
- Henryk Średnicki (1955–2016), Polish boxer
- Henryk Szordykowski (1944–2022), Polish middle distance runner

=== Other ===
- Henryk Abicht (1835–1863), Polish socialist and independence activist
- Henryk Firlej (1574–1626), Polish noble, bishop
- Henryk Grohman (1862–1939), Polish industrialist of German origin
- Henryk Gulbinowicz (1923–2020), Archbishop of Wrocław from 1976 to 2004
- Henryk de Kwiatkowski (1924–2003), Polish-born member of the Royal Air Force
- Henryk Łowmiański (1898–1984), Polish medieval historian
- Henryk Muszyński (born 1933), Primate Emeritus of Poland and former Archbishop
- Henryk Pająk (born 1937), Polish writer, journalist and publisher
- Henryk Tauber (1917–2000), Polish Jewish Holocaust survivor
- Henryk Tomasik (born 1946), Bishop of Radom
- Henryk Zieliński (1920–1981), Polish historian and professor at the University of Wrocław

== See also ==
- Hendric
- Hendrick (disambiguation)
- Hendricks (disambiguation)
- Hendrickx
- Hendrik (disambiguation)
- Hendriks
- Hendrikx
- Hendrix (disambiguation)
- Hendryx
- Henrik
- Henry (disambiguation)
