= Enn =

Male given name

- Gender: Male
- Language: Estonian
- Name day: 19 January

Origin
- Region of origin: Estonia

Other names
- Related names: Endrik, Hendrik, Henrik, Henri, Heino, Henn, Henno, Enno, Eno

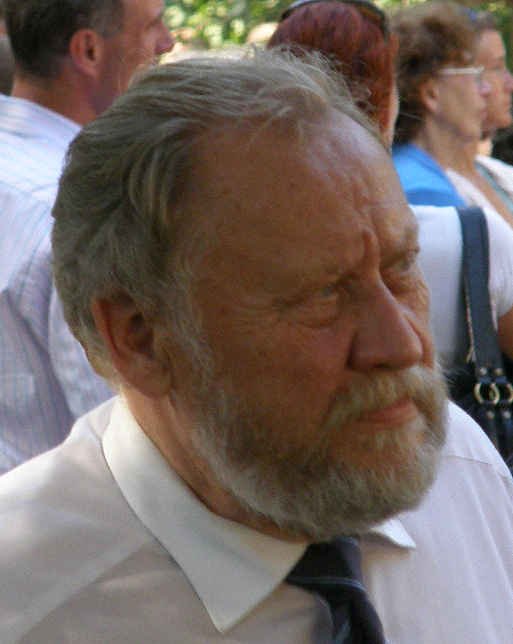
Enn Tarto

Enn is an Estonian masculine given name, a form of Henry and may refer to:

- Enn Eesmaa (born 1946). Estonian journalist and politician
- Enn Griffel (1935–2007), Estonian auto racing driver
- Enn Kasak (born 1954), Estonian philosopher and astrophysicist
- Enn Kippel (1901–1942), Estonian writer and journalist
- Enn Klooren (1940–2011), Estonian actor
- Enn Kokk (1937–2019), Estonian-born Swedish journalist and writer
- Enn Kraam (1943–2001), Estonian actor
- Enn Lilienthal (born 1962), Estonian sprinter
- Enn Meri (born 1942), Estonian politician
- Enn Kunila (born 1950), Estonian entrepreneur and art collector
- Enn Mikker (aka Vormsi Enn) (1943–2020), Estonian esoteric practitioner
- Enn Nõu (born 1933), Estonian writer
- Enn Nurmiste (1894–1968), Estonian politician
- Enn Põldroos (1933–2025), Estonian painter, monumental artist and writer
- Enn Rajasaar (born 1961), Estonian architect
- Enn Reitel (born 1950), Estonian-Scottish actor and impressionist
- Enn Roos (1908–1990), Estonian sculptor
- Enn Säde (born 1938), Estonian film sound designer and film director
- Enn Sellik (born 1954), Estonian long-distance runner and Olympic competitor
- Enn-Arno Sillari (born 1944), Estonian communist politician
- Enn Soosaar (1937–2010), Estonian translator, critic, columnist and publicist
- Enn Tarto (1938–2021), Estonian politician
- Enn Tarvel (1932–2021), Estonian historian
- Enn Toona (1909–1973), Estonian actor and theatre director
- Enn Tupp (born 1941), Estonian politician, diplomat, biathlete and Estonian Defense Forces major
- Enn Vetemaa (1936–2017), Estonian writer
- Enn Võrk (1905–1962), Estonian composer, conductor and organist
- Kristo Enn Vaga (born 1997), Estonian racing cyclist and politician
