= Hendricks =

Hendricks may refer to:

== Places ==
- Hendricks, Kentucky
- Hendricks, Michigan
- Hendricks, Minnesota, largest city in the U.S. with that name.
- Hendricks, West Virginia
- Hendricks County, Indiana
- Hendricks Township (disambiguation)
- Lake Hendricks

== Other uses ==
- Hendricks (surname)
- Hendrick's Gin

== See also ==
- Hendrick (disambiguation)
- Hendric
- Hendrik (disambiguation)
- Hendrickx
- Hendriks
- Hendrikx
- Hendrix (disambiguation)
- Hendryx
- Henrik
- Henry (disambiguation)
- Henryk (disambiguation)
