= Haddrick =

Haddrick is a surname. Notable people with the surname include:

- Alfred Haddrick (1868–1939), Australian cricketer
- Greg Haddrick (born 1960), Australian screenwriter and film and television producer
- Ron Haddrick (1929–2020), Australian actor, cricketer, narrator, and presenter

== See also ==
- Handrick
