= Langguth =

Langguth is a surname, and may refer to:

- A. J. Langguth (1933–2014), American author, journalist and educator
- Gerd Langguth (born 1946), German professor of political science
- David Langguth (born 1973), German descent, Canadian professional drummer sponsored by German Drum Manufacturer Sonor, Sabian Cymbals, and Vic Firth Sticks.
- Heike Langguth (born 1979), German Muay Thai champion
- Franz Wilhelm Langguth Erben, a German winery
