= Hendriks =

Hendriks is a Dutch patronymic surname. Notable people with the surname include:

- A. L. Hendriks (1922–1992), Jamaican poet, writer, and broadcasting director
- Arnoud Hendriks (born 1949), Dutch figure skater
- Berend Hendriks (1918–1997), Dutch artist
- Eileen Hendriks (1887–1978), British geologist
- Geoff Hendriks (born 1959), Australian rules footballer
- Hélène Hendriks (born 1980), Dutch television presenter
- Irene Hendriks (born 1958), Dutch field hockey player
- Jackie Hendriks (born 1933), Jamaican cricketer
- Jake Hendriks (born 1981), English television actor
- Jan Hendriks (1928–1991), German actor
- Jean Hendriks (1925–2015), Dutch politician
- Jerry Hendriks (born 1988), Dutch darts player
- Jimmy Hendriks (born 1994), Dutch darts player
- Joan Hendriks (1936–2020), Australian indigenous rights activist
- Johannes Willibrordus Maria Hendriks (born 1954), Dutch auxiliary bishop
- Kaj Hendriks (born 1987), Dutch rower
- Kiki Hendriks (born 2000), Dutch para-athlete
- Leo Hendriks (born 1983), Dutch darts player
- Liam Hendriks (born 1989), Australian baseball player
- Maurits Hendriks (born 1961), Dutch field hockey coach
- Pieter Hendriks (born 1970), South African rugby union player
- Rose Hendriks (fl. 1845–1856), British novelist and poet
- Sam Hendriks (born 1995), Dutch football player
- Theo Hendriks (1928–2015), Dutch politician
- Thijs Hendriks (born 1985), Dutch football player

== See also ==
- Jimi Hendrix
- Hendric
- Hendrick (disambiguation)
- Hendricks (disambiguation)
- Hendrickx
- Hendrik (disambiguation)
- Hendrikse
- Hendriksen
- Hendrikx
- Hendrix (disambiguation)
- Hendryx
- Henrik
- Henry (disambiguation)
- Henryk (given name)
