= Handrick =

Handrick is a surname of German origin. Notable people with the surname include:

- Gotthard Handrick (1908–1978), German Olympic athlete and Spanish Civil War and World War II fighter pilot
- Joe Handrick (born 1965), American politician
- Jörg Handrick (born 1968), German ice hockey player

== See also ==
- Hendrick (surname)
- Hendrik (given name)
- Hendricks (surname)
