= Heike (name) =

- Pronunciation: German pronunciation: [ˈhaɪˌkə]
- Gender: Feminine
- Language: German, Dutch, Frisian

Origin
- Languages: 1. Low German; 2. German
- Origin: 1. Heinrike; 2. Heinrich
- Region of origin: Germany, Scandinavia

Other names
- Variant forms: Drika, Heiko, Heintje, Rik, Rika, Rike
- Cognates: Henrietta (given name); Henry (given name)
- Related names: Elke, Frauke, Haika, Silke
- Popularity: see popular names

Heike is a given name of Germanic origin, most commonly but not exclusively female. The male form is Heiko. Heike is also a surname.

Notable persons with this name include:

== Given name ==
=== Feminine ===
- Heike Blaßneck (born 1971), German hurdler
- Heike Balck (born 1970), German high jumper
- Heike Klippel (born 1960), German film and media studies scholar.
- Heike Dähne (born 1961), German swimmer
- Heike Drechsler (born 1964), German track and field athlete
- Heike Faber (born 1965), German television actress
- Heike Fassbender, German mathematician
- Heike Fischer (born 1982), German diver
- Heike Friedrich (born 1970), German freestyle swimmer
- Heike Gebhard (born 1954), German politician
- Heike Geißler (born 1977), German writer
- Heike Henkel (born 1964), German athlete
- Heike Hennig (born 1966), German choreographer and director
- Heike Heubach (born 1979), German politician
- Heike Kemmer (born 1962), German equestrian gold medalist
- Heike Koerner (born 1973), Mexican backstroke swimmer
- Heike Langguth (born 1979), German vice-champion in Muay Thai
- Heike Lätzsch (born 1973), German field hockey striker
- Heike Lehmann (born 1962), German volleyball
- Heike Makatsch (born 1971), German actress
- Heike Meißner (born 1970), German athlete
- Heike Popel, East German luger
- Heike Rabenow is an East German sprint canoer
- Heike Riel (born 1971), German nanotechnologies
- Heike Schulte-Mattler (born 1958), German athlete
- Heike Schwaller (born 1968), German-Swiss curler
- Heike Tischler (born 1964), German heptathlete
- Heike Warnicke (born 1966), German speed skater
- Heike Wezel (born 1968), German cross country skier
- Heike Wilms-Kegel (born 1952), German physician and politician
- Heike Winzent (born 1976), German politician

=== Masculine ===
- Heike Kamerlingh Onnes (1853–1926), Dutch physicist

== Surname ==
- Georg Heike (1933–2023), German phonetician and linguist
- Jürgen W. Heike (1949–2022), German politician
- Michiyo Heike (born 1979), Japanese singer-songwriter

== See also ==
- Heike (disambiguation)
