= Hendrickx =

Hendrickx is a Dutch-language surname of Belgian origin. Notable people with the surname include:

- Albert Hendrickx (1916–1990), Belgian racing cyclist
- Alexander Hendrickx (born 1993), Belgian field hockey player
- Björn Hendrickx (born 1974), Belgian rower
- Gaëtan Hendrickx (born 1995), Belgian footballer
- Harrie Hendrickx, Belgian politician
- Jonathan Hendrickx (born 1993), Belgian footballer
- Jorik Hendrickx (born 1992), Belgian figure skater
- Joris Hendrickx (born 1983), Belgian sidecarcross rider, 2009 World champion
- Jules Hendrickx (1899–1973), Belgian racing cyclist
- Loena Hendrickx (born 1999), Belgian figure skater
- Marc Hendrickx (born 1968), Flemish politician
- Marcel Hendrickx (cyclist) (1925–2008), Belgian racing cyclist
- Marcel Hendrickx (politician) (1935–2020), Belgian politician
- Monic Hendrickx (born 1966), Dutch actress
- Nico Hendrickx (born 1976), Belgian archer
- Sofie Hendrickx (born 1986), Belgian basketball player
- Wiel Hendrickx (1908–1984), Dutch equestrian

== See also ==
- Henderickx
- Hendric
- Hendrick (disambiguation)
- Hendricks (disambiguation)
- Hendrik (disambiguation)
- Hendriks
- Hendrikx
- Hendrix (disambiguation)
- Hendryx
- Henrik
- Henry (disambiguation)
- Henryk (disambiguation)
