= Henry Bull =

Henry Bull may refer to:

- Henry Bull (theologian) (died 1577), English Protestant writer
- Henry Bull (MP) (1630–1692), English member of parliament
- Henry Bull (settler) (1799–c. 1848), British Royal Navy officer and pioneer settler of the Swan River Colony in Australia
- Henry Bull (governor) (1610–1694), governor of Rhode Island, 1685–86, 1690
- Henry Bull (speaker) (1687–1774), speaker of the House of Deputies of the Colony of Rhode Island and Providence Plantations
- Henry Bull (cricketer) (1843–1905), English cricketer.
- Henry Graves Bull (1818–1885), British medical doctor, botanist and mycologist
- Henrik Johan Bull (1844–1930), known as Henry Bull, Norwegian businessman and shipping magnate

== See also ==
- Henrik Bull (disambiguation)
- Henry Bull House, Newport, Rhode Island
