= Henrike =

Henrike is a feminine given name of Germanic origin, the female form of the male given name Henrik. Notable women with the name include:

- Henrike Brandstötter (born 1975), Austrian politician
- Henrike Dons (1874–1966), Norwegian educator and missionary, better known as Henny Dons
- Henrike Hahn (born 1970), German politician
- Henrike Handrup (born 1983), German Paralympic cyclist
- Henrike Heiland (born 1975), German author, translator and publisher, better known under her pen name Zoë Beck
- Henrike Johnston (born 1943), Australian politician, better known as Ricky Johnston
- Henrike Kadzidroga (born 1971), German tennis player
- Henrike Lähnemann (born 1968), German medievalist and professor
- Henrike Müller (born 1975), German politician
- Henrike Naumann (1984–2026), German contemporary installation artist
- Swantje Henrike Michaelsen (born 1979), German politician
