= Haika =

Haika may refer to:

- Haika Grossman, Israeli politician
- Lydia Haika, Kenyan politician

== See also ==
- Heike
