= Hendrix (disambiguation) =

Jimi Hendrix (1942–1970) was an American guitarist, singer, and songwriter.

Hendrix may also refer to:

- Hendrix (surname)
- Hendrix (film), a 2000 film about the guitarist
- Jimi Hendrix (film), also known as A Film About Jimi Hendrix. a 1973 documentary
- Hendrix Marion "Mutt" Fowler (1918-2014), Louisiana politician and businessman
- Hendrix (crater), a lunar impact crater
- Hendrix, Oklahoma, a town, United States
- Hendrix College, a private college located in Conway, Arkansas, United States
- Hendrix Junior High School, a public school in Chandler, Arizona, United States
- Hendrix chord, a chord in guitar playing
- Hendrix Lapierre (born 2002), ice hockey centre playing for the NHL's Washington Capitals
- Hendrix the Husky, the University of Washington Tacoma's mascot
- Hndrxx, (pronounced Hendrix) an album by Future

== See also ==
- Hendric
- Hendrick (disambiguation)
- Hendricks (disambiguation)
- Hendrickx
- Hendrik (disambiguation)
- Hendriks
- Hendrikx
- Hendryx
- Henrik
- Henry (disambiguation)
- Henryk (disambiguation)
