= Henderickx =

Henderickx is a surname of Belgian origin. Notable people with the surname include:

- Albert Henderickx (1900–1965), Belgian footballer
- Hans Henderickx (1961–2016), Belgian entomologist
- Philip Henderickx (born 1976), Belgian artist
- Wim Henderickx (1962–2022), Belgian composer

== See also ==
- Hendrickx
