= Heigo =

- Gender: Male

Other names
- Related names: Heiko

Heigo is a masculine given name.

People named Heigo include:

- Heigo Hamaguchi (born 1974), Japanese professional wrestler
- Heigo Fuchino (1888-1961), architect from Hawaii
