= Hendric =

Hendric may be a given name and refer to:

- George Hendric Houghton (1820-1897), American theologian
- Hendric van Alckmer (15th century), Middle Dutch writer

== See also ==
- Hendrick (disambiguation)
- Hendricks (disambiguation)
- Hendrickx
- Hendrik (disambiguation)
- Hendriks
- Hendrikx
- Hendrix (disambiguation)
- Hendryx
- Henrik
- Henry (disambiguation)
- Henryk (given name)
