= Hendrich =

Hendrich may refer to:

- Hermann Hendrich (1854-1931), German painter
- Hendrich (footballer) (born 1986), Hendrich Miller Meireles Bernardo, Brazilian football attacking midfielder
- Kathrin Hendrich (born 1992), German football defender
- Hendrich's Drop Forge, museum in Solingen, Germany

== See also ==
- Henrich
- Hendrick (disambiguation)
- Hendrik (disambiguation)
