= Paul F. Hendrix =

Paul F. Hendrix is a professor in the Odum School of Ecology at the University of Georgia. He is widely considered an expert in the biology and ecology of earthworm invasions.

Hendrix received his PhD from the University of Georgia. In 2011, he was awarded the Lifetime Professional Achievement Award of the Soil Ecology Society.

Hendrix is the editor of Biological Invasions Belowground: Earthworms as Invasive Species.
