= Rose Hendriks =

British novelist and poet

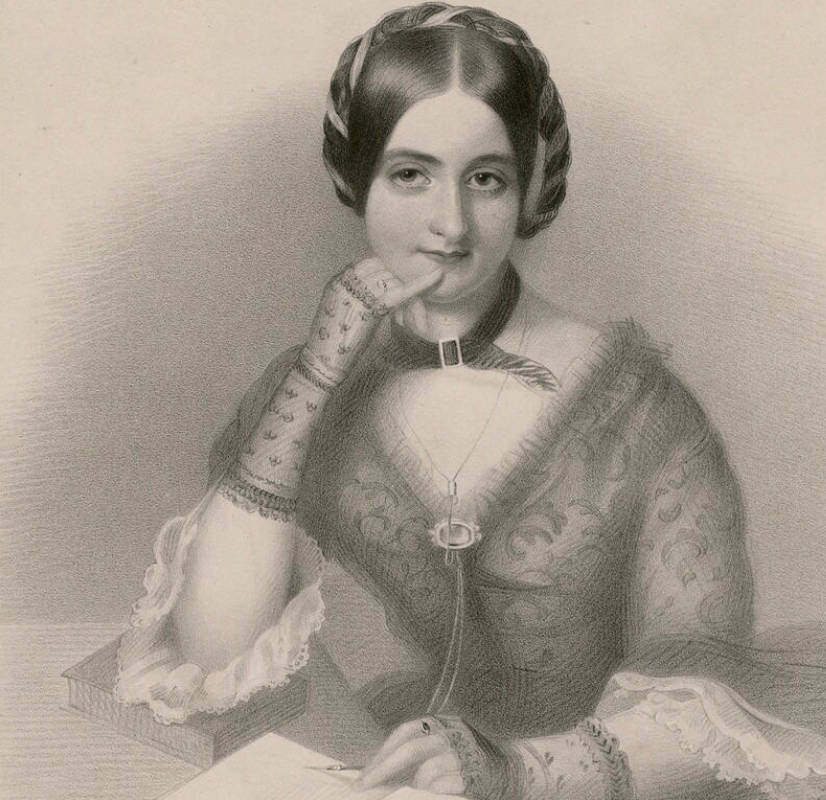
- Died: after 1856
- Other names: Rose Ellen Temple
- Known for: novels and poems
- Spouse: Mr Temple

Rose Ellen Hendriks who became Rose Ellen Temple (fl. 1845 – 1856) was an ambitious British novelist and poet. Her history is revealed by books that describe a novelist with a very similar life story who read famous authors including "Rose Ellen Hendriks".

== Life ==
Hendriks life is known only from her work that was published between 1845 and 1856. She is said to be Jewish by heritage but to have been raised to be a Christian. She says that she is young and ambitious in the introductions published with her early work as she wanted to be famous for her writing. Her first published novel in 1845 is historical and it was called The Astrologer's Daughter. The following year Charlotte Corday and The Idler Reformed were published. Some insight into her life is shown in her 1847 book The Young Authoress which appears to be a partial autobiography. The writer described in the book is named Rosalie de Rochequillon and she is always talking of Dickens, or Bulwer, or Rose Ellen Hendriks. In 1847 she published essays collected as Political Fame and The Wild Rose and other Poems.

She said she would marry in her 1849 book Chit-Chat. Her last novel in 1851 Ella, the Ballet Girl and her last published work in 1856 The Poet's Souvenir of Amateur Artists used the last name of Temple. The last work was a series of poems that were paired with well known paintings that inspired them. The book also included an engraving of Hendriks who had done "everything in her power to earn the appellation" of genius.

At some point in the 1840s or 1850s her portrait was recorded by Alfred Tidey and this image was recreated as an engraving by Lowes Cato Dickinson. This image was included in her final work and it is held in London's National Portrait Gallery.
