= Henri Duvanel =

French water polo player (1896–1953)

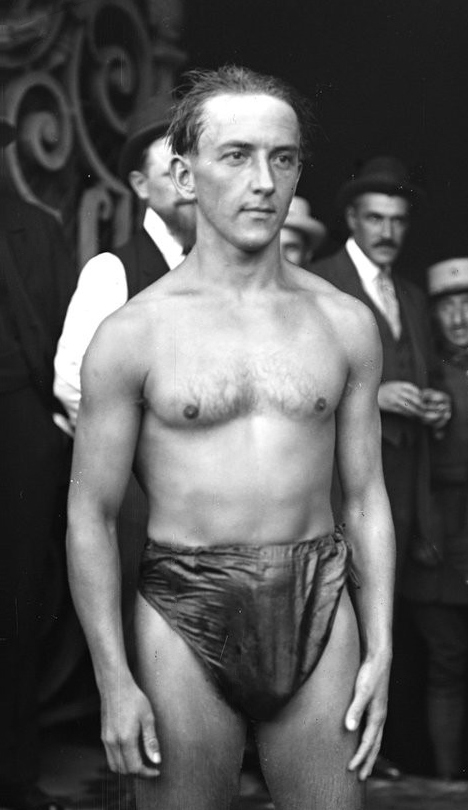
- Henri Duvanel in 1920

Personal information
- Born: 7 March 1896
- Died: 21 February 1953 (aged 56)

Sport
- Sport: Water polo
- Club: Libellule de Paris

Henri Duvanel (7 March 1896 – 21 February 1953) was a French water polo player. He competed at the 1920 Summer Olympics, but his team was eliminated in the first round. Duvanel was also a swimmer and lieutenant in the French Army.
