= Heiko Haumann =

German historian

Heiko Haumann (born 9 February 1945) is a German historian and retired academic scholar.

Born in Attendorn, Haumann studied history, political science, sociology and education at the University of Marburg and the Goethe University Frankfurt. In 1969, he graduated with the Staatsexamen, and in 1971 he received his doctorate. After working at the University of Marburg and the University of Freiburg, from 1991 to 2010, he was Professor of Eastern European and Modern General History at the Department of History of the University of Basel.

Haumann methodologically represents a life-world-oriented microhistorical approach in the study of history. This approach places the people or the perspective of the historical actors at the centre of the observation in order to arrive at insights on the structural level from there. He wrote among others a History of Russia. His research on Eastern European Jewry led to the creation of the book History of the Eastern Jews. The work focuses on the everyday life of the Eastern Jews as well as their political and religious positions. Among Haumann's most important students are Carmen Scheide, Monica Rüthers, Jörn Happel and Ralph Tuchtenhagen. Haumann was a "permanent contributor" to the journal Das Argument in the 1980s.

Since 1983, Haumann lives in Yach, a district of Elzach, where he is, among others, a member of the Heimat- und Landschaftspflegeverein (local history and landscape conservation association).

== Publications ==
- Elektrifizierung als Auftakt sowjetischer Planwirtschaft. Inhalt und Funktion des GOELRO-Planes von 1920. Marburg 1971, DNB-IDN 570294320 (Dissertation Universität Marburg, Fachbereich Gesellschaftswissenschaft 1971, 312 pages, 22 cm).
- Grundlagen der sowjetischen Wirtschaftsverfassung. Materialien. Hain, Meisenheim am Glan 1977, ISBN 3-445-01436-1 (Hochschulschriften. Vol. 9).
- Beginn der Planwirtschaft. Elektrifizierung, Wirtschaftsplanung und gesellschaftliche Entwicklung Sowjetrusslands 1917–1921 (Studien zur modernen Geschichte, vol. 15), Bertelsmann-Universitätsverlag, Düsseldorf 1974, ISBN 3-571-05026-6 (Dissertation Universität Marburg Fachbereich Gesellschaftswissenschaft 1971, 312 pages, 23 cm).
- Geschichte und Gesellschaftssystem der Sowjetunion. Eine Einführung. Kiepenheuer und Witsch, Cologne 1977, ISBN 3-462-01204-5.
- Kapitalismus im zaristischen Staat 1906–1917. Organisationsformen, Machtverhältnisse und Leistungsbilanz im Industrialisierungsprozess. Hain, Königstein im Taunus 1980, ISBN 3-445-01981-9 (Habilitationsschrift DNB 801075416, University, Faculty of Philosophy Freiburg im Breisgau 1977, 324 pages).
- Geschichte der Ostjuden. Deutscher Taschenbuch-Verlag, Munich 1990 (5th edition 1999), ISBN 3-423-30663-7.
- "Der Fall Max Faulhaber." Gewerkschaften und Kommunisten – ein Beispiel aus Südbaden 1949–1952. Verlag Arbeiterbewegung und Gesellschaftswissenschaft, Marburg 1987, ISBN 3-921630-77-0.
- with Hans Schadek (as editor): Geschichte der Stadt Freiburg im Breisgau. 3 volumes, thesis, Stuttgart 1996, 2nd extended edition 2001, ISBN 978-3-8062-1635-6).
- Geschichte Russlands. Piper, Munich/Zürich 1996, ISBN 3-0340-0638-1. Neuausgabe Chronos, Zürich 2003, ISBN 3-03-400638-1.
- Dracula. Leben und Legende (Beck’sche Reihe). C. H. Beck, Munich 2011, ISBN 978-3-40661-214-5.
- Hermann Diamanski (1910–1976). Überleben in der Katastrophe. Eine deutsche Geschichte zwischen Auschwitz und Staatssicherheitsdienst. Böhlau, Vienna/Cologne/Weimar 2011, ISBN 978-3-412-20787-8.
- Die Akte Zilli Reichmann. Zur Geschichte der Sinti im 20. Jahrhundert. Fischer Taschenbuch Verlag, Frankfurt, 2016, ISBN 978-3-10-397210-8.
- as editor: Armut im ländlichen Raum während des 19. und zu Beginn des 20. Jahrhunderts, Verlag Regionalkultur, Ubstadt-Weiher 2017, ISBN 978-3-95505-030-6.
