= Heiko (given name) =

Male given name

Heiko is a traditional given name of Germanic origin. It is the short form of the name Heinrich—cognate of Henry. Heiko is an old name. The first documentary evidence of this name comes from the 13th century. It means "the powerful ruler over the country", the "master of the country" or "the master of the house". and derives from old high German "heima" = "the home, the home country" and old high German "rihhi" = "powerful, rich". The female form is Heike.

Notable people called Heiko include:

- Heiko Balz (born 1969), German sportsman
- Heiko Bellmann (1950–2014), German zoologist
- Heiko Bonan (born 1966), German soccer player
- Heiko Butscher (born 1980), German soccer player
- Heiko Daxl (1957–2012), German artist
- Heiko Dietz (born 1967), German actor
- Heiko Echter von der Leyen, (born 1955), German professor of medicine and the husband of politician Ursula von der Leyen
- Heiko Engelkes (1933–2008), German journalist
- Heiko Fischer (1960–1989), German figure skater
- Heiko Folkerts (1930–2017), German architect, pioneer of ecological architecture
- Heiko Mathias Förster (born 1966), German conductor
- Heiko Gerber (born 1972), German soccer player
- Heiko Grimm (born 1977), German handball player
- Heiko Hammel (born 1988), German automobile racer
- Heiko Haumann (born 1945), German historian
- Heiko Hecht (born 1977), German politician
- Heiko Herlofson (born 1969), German porn star
- Heiko Herrlich (born 1971), German soccer player
- Heiko Hoffmann (born 1935), German politician
- Heiko Kleibrink (born 1973), German dancer
- Heiko Kröger (born 1966), German yachtsman
- Heiko Laux, German musician
- Heiko Laeßig (born 1968), German soccer player
- Heiko Maas (born 1966), German politician
- Heiko Meyer (born 1976), German athlete
- Heiko Niidas (born 1983), Estonian basketball player
- Heiko Augustinus Oberman (1930–2001), Dutch professor
- Heiko Paluschka (born 1968), German presenter
- Heiko Peschke (born 1963), German soccer player
- Heiko Petersen (born 1980), German soccer player
- Heiko Rannula (born 1983), Estonian basketball player and coach
- Heiko Reissig (born 1966), German singer and actor
- Heiko Schaffartzik (born 1984), German basketball player
- Heiko Scholz (born 1966), German soccer player
- Heiko Schumacher (born 1954), German soccer player
- Heiko Steuer (born 1939), German archeologist
- Heiko Strohmann (born 1968), German politician
- Heiko Thieme (born 1943), German manager
- Heiko Triebener (born 1964), German musician
- Heiko Uecker (1939–2019), German literature scholar
- Heiko Waßer (born 1957), German journalist
- Heiko Weber (born 1965), German soccer player
- Heiko Westermann (born 1983), German soccer player
- Heiko Wohlgemuth (born 1972), German actor

== Fictional characters ==
- Heiko, Germanic version of the name of the character Wally, belonging to the Pokémon game franchise
