= Heiko Strohmann =

German politician (born 1968)

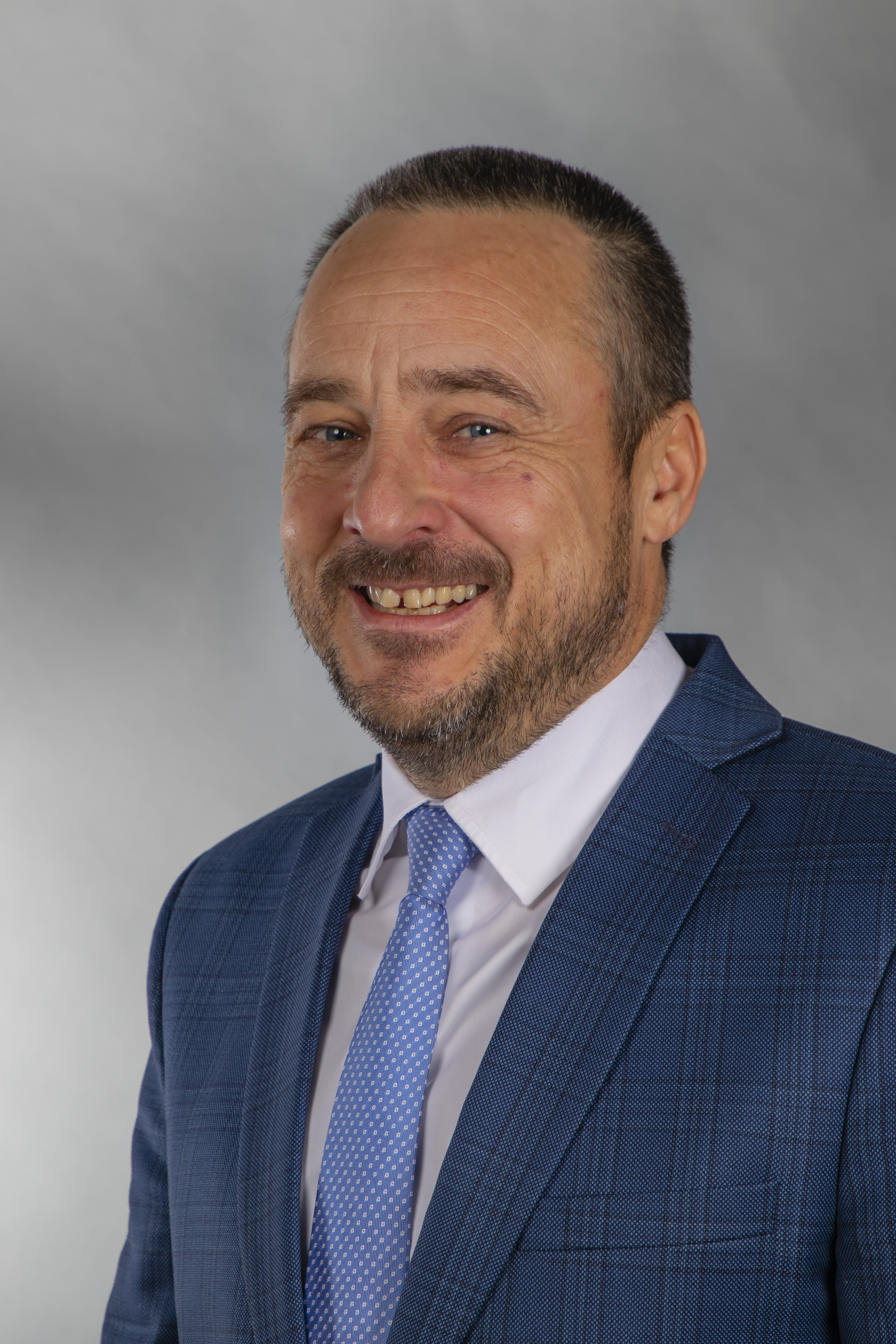
- Strohmann in 2019

Member of the Bürgerschaft of Bremen
- Incumbent
- Assumed office 28 June 1999

Personal details
- Born: 8 March 1968 (age 58)
- Party: Christian Democratic Union (since 1995)

Heiko Strohmann (born 8 March 1968) is a German politician serving as a member of the Bürgerschaft of Bremen since 1999. He has served as chairman of the Christian Democratic Union in Bremen since 2023.
