= Kimberly Hendrix =

American fashion designer

Kimberly Hendrix (May 17, 1969, Riverside, California – March 11, 2015) was an American fashion designer in St. Petersburg, Florida. She became a fashion designer in 2007 after working as an interior designer, vintage collector, and seamstress. she codesigned co-design a full runway collection for fall 2008 Mercedes Benz Fashion Week and appeared on the TLC reality series Bikini or Bust. Her work included bustiers and dresses and features beading, embroidery, and "raw" edging. She used reclaimed or recycled vintage materials. Hendrix had a K.Hendrix showroom in downtown St. Petersburg. "Work hard and be kind." She died of cancer on March 11, 2015, at the age of 45.
