= Hendryx =

Hendryx is a surname. Notable people with the surname include:

- James Hendryx (1880-1963), American author of western fiction
- John Hendryx (born 19?), American theologian (adherent of monergism)
- Nona Hendryx (born 1944), American singer and actress, cousin of Jimi Hendrix
- Tim Hendryx (1891–1957), American baseball player
- JPEGMAFIA (born 1989), American rapper and producer, formerly known as Devon Hendryx

== See also ==
- Jimi Hendrix
- Hendric
- Hendrick (disambiguation)
- Hendricks (disambiguation)
- Hendrickx
- Hendrik (disambiguation)
- Hendriks
- Hendrikx
- Hendrix (disambiguation)
- Henrik
- Henry (disambiguation)
- Henryk (given name)
