= Hinrek van Alckmer =

Hinrek van Alckmer, also known as Hendric van Alckmaer, Henrik van Alkmer and Henry of Alkmaar, was a 15th-century Middle Dutch author who wrote one of the principal published versions of Reynard the Fox in 1487.

At one time a councillor to the bishop of Utrecht, he was banned from the city in 1477 after which he moved to Gelderland. Around 1475 he put together a version of Reynard the Fox that he had divided into four volumes and a number of chapters with titles and commentary. It was printed in Antwerp in 1487 by Gheraert Leeu. Repeatedly printed throughout Europe, it is the source of a number of translations.

The Haarlem edition of 1826 includes a parallel text in early 19th century Dutch by Jacobus Scheltema.
