= Henrik Hansen =

Henrik Hansen may refer to:

- Henrik Hansen (wrestler) (1920-2010), Danish Olympic wrestler
- Henrik Hansen (cricketer) (born 1977), Danish cricketer
- Henrik Hansen (footballer) (born 1979), Danish professional football midfielder
- Henrik Toft Hansen (born 1986), Danish handball player
- Froggen (born 1994), the screen alias of Danish League of Legends player Henrik Hansen
