= Berend Hendriks =

Dutch artist

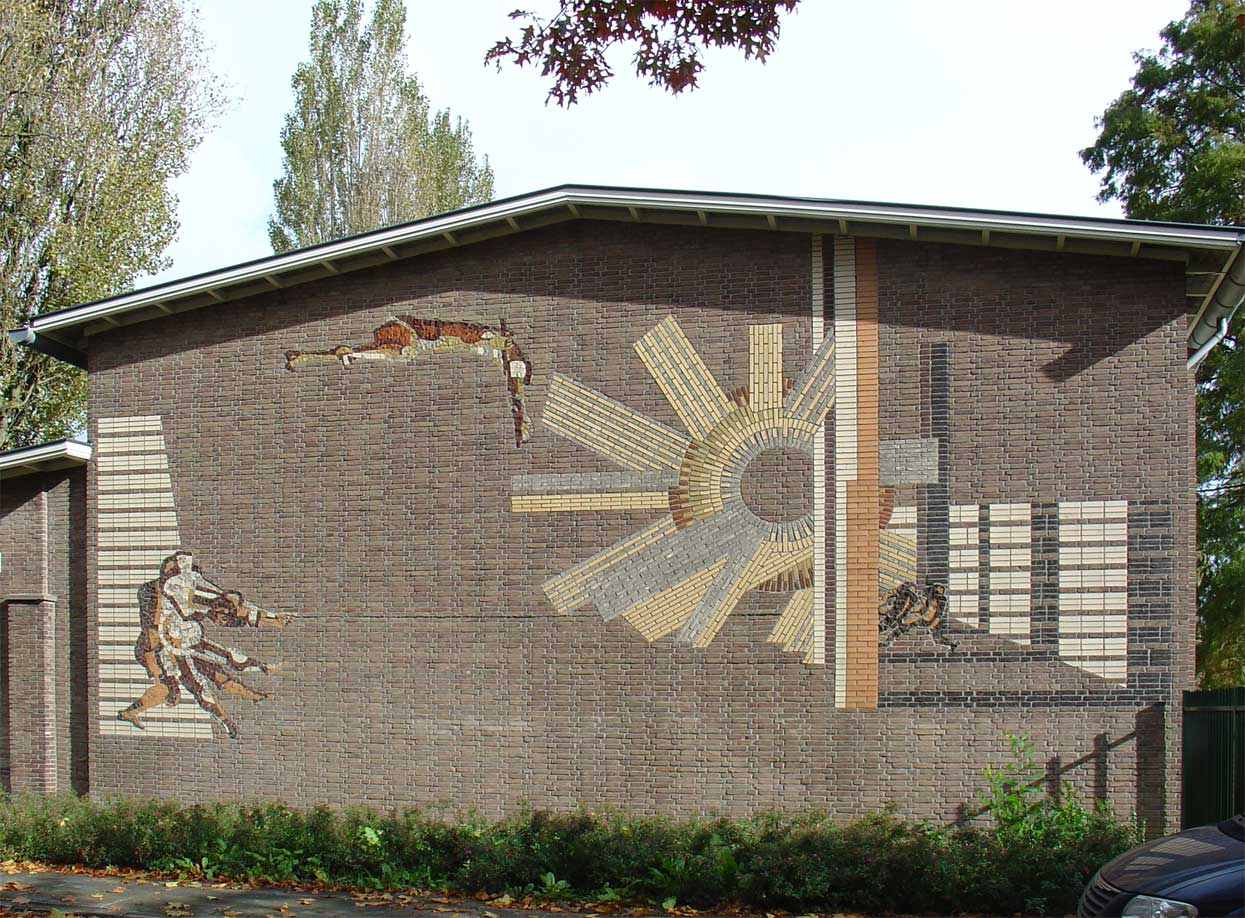
Stone Mosaic "Stone pullers," Gouda

Berend Hendriks (Apeldoorn, July 9, 1918 – Arnhem, August 6, 1997) was a Dutch artist, and lecturer at the ArtEZ Academy of fine art in Arnhem. Together with Peter Struycken he initiated the Arnhem school of environmental art.

== Life and work ==
Hendriks, son of an arborist from Apeldoorn, was initially destined to follow into his father's footsteps. He attended the horticultural school in Boskoop, but finally opted for a career in the visual arts. He continued his studies at the Rijksacademie in Amsterdam, where he studied with Heinrich Campendonk. After graduating he developed into a versatile artist; Painter, glass painting, wall painting, monumental artist, environmental artist, sculptor, ceramist and maker of mosaic. In the 1950s René Karrer worked as assistant to Hendriks.

Hendriks exhibited among others at the Stedelijk Museum in Amsterdam, the Gemeentelijk Van Reekum Museum (now CODA museum) in Apeldoorn and the School of the Arts in Arnhem. At this art school Hendriks was lecturer and stimulated the development of environmental art. Hendriks' work is included in the collection of the CODA museum in Apeldoorn and of the Museum The Pavilions in Almere.

Environmental works of Hendriks can be found in public space in Amersfoort, Gouda and Hengelo. His paintings are characterized by geometric shapes, in which he uses mathematical sequences, both in content and color.

== Gallery ==
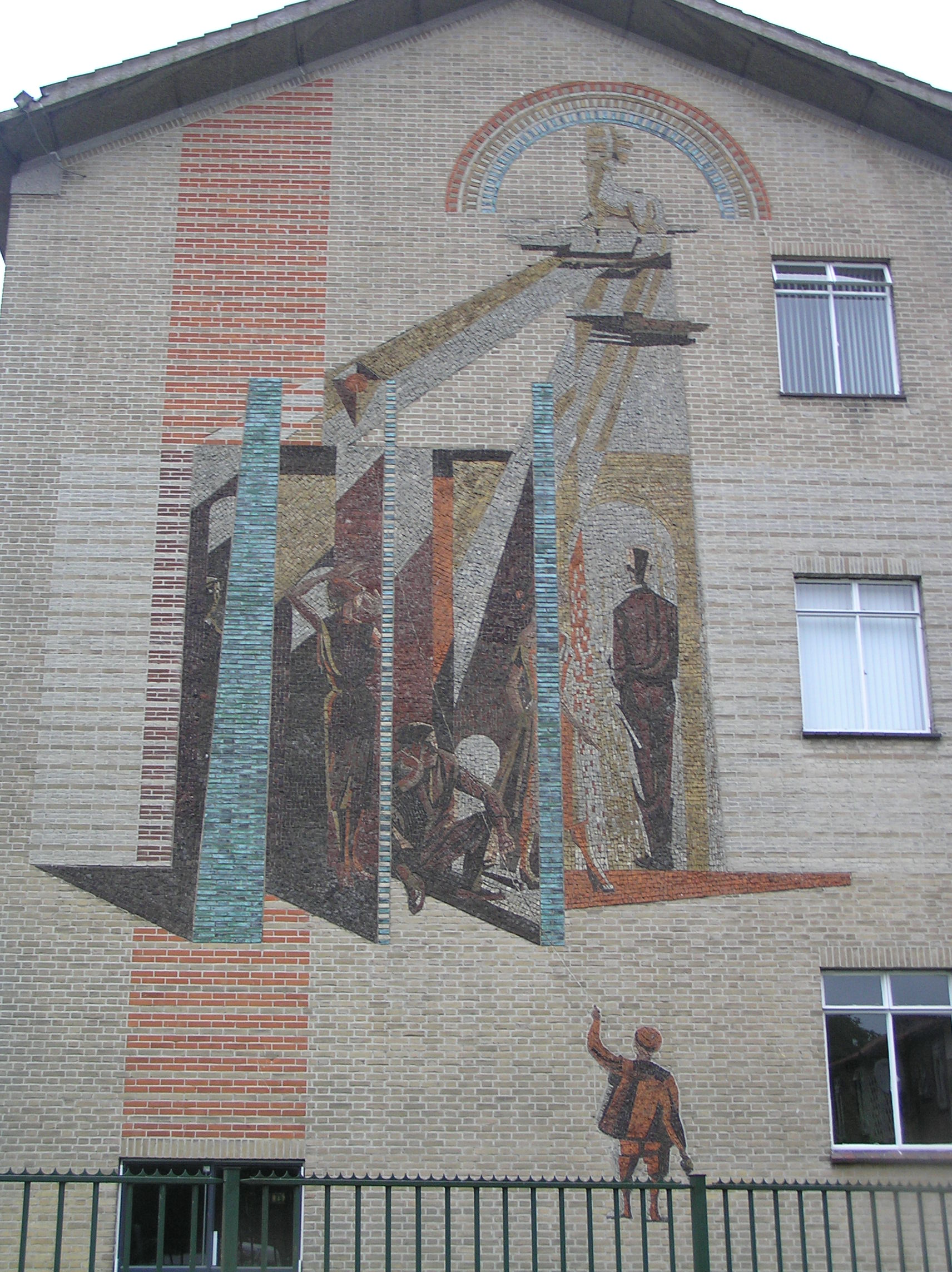
Stone Mosaic, Corderius College, Amersfoort

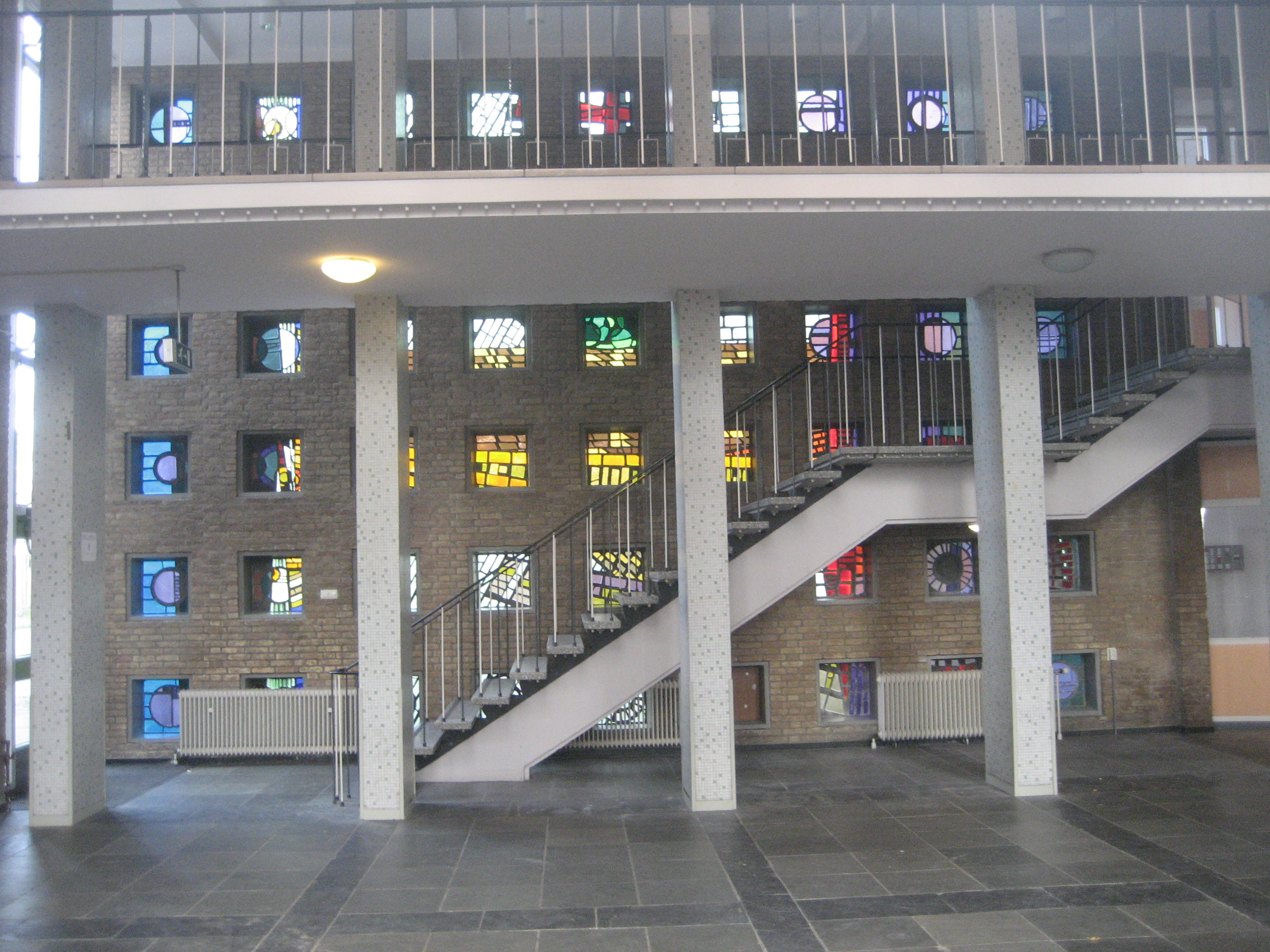
Stained concrete, Chr. Nijverheidsschool Boshuizen, Leiden

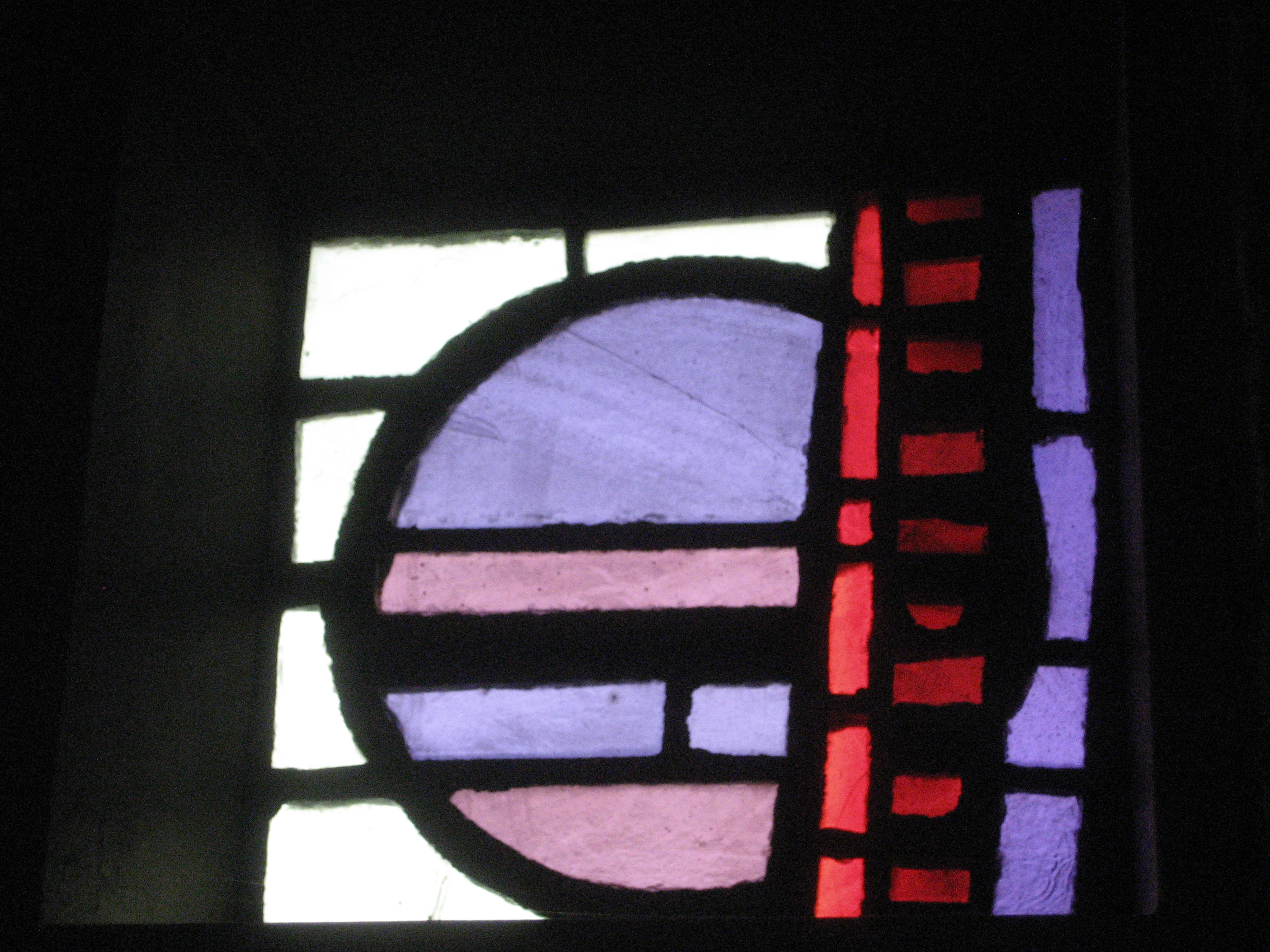
Detail glass wall Boshuizen School, Leiden

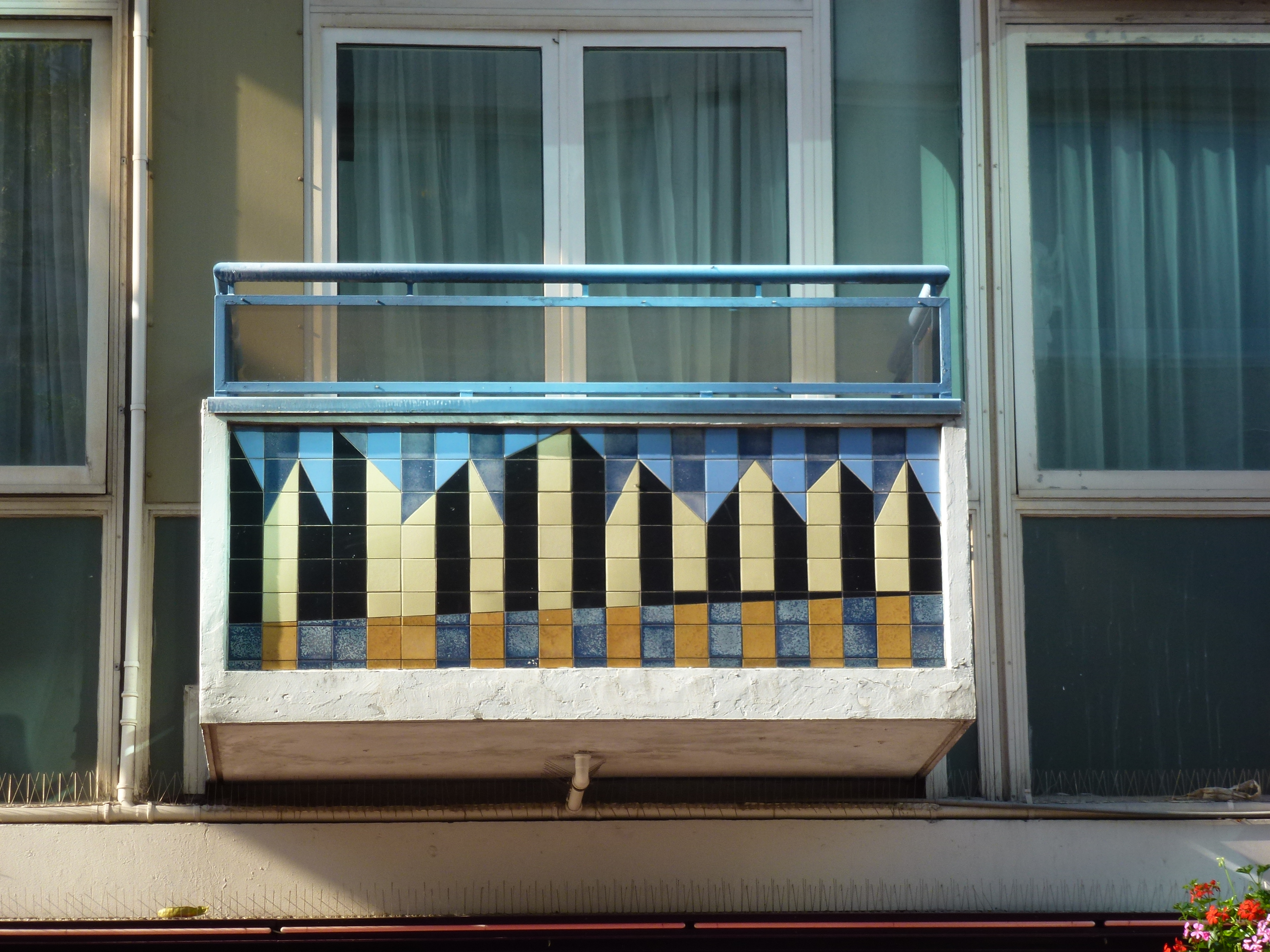
Balcony Decorations Neuve, Eindhoven

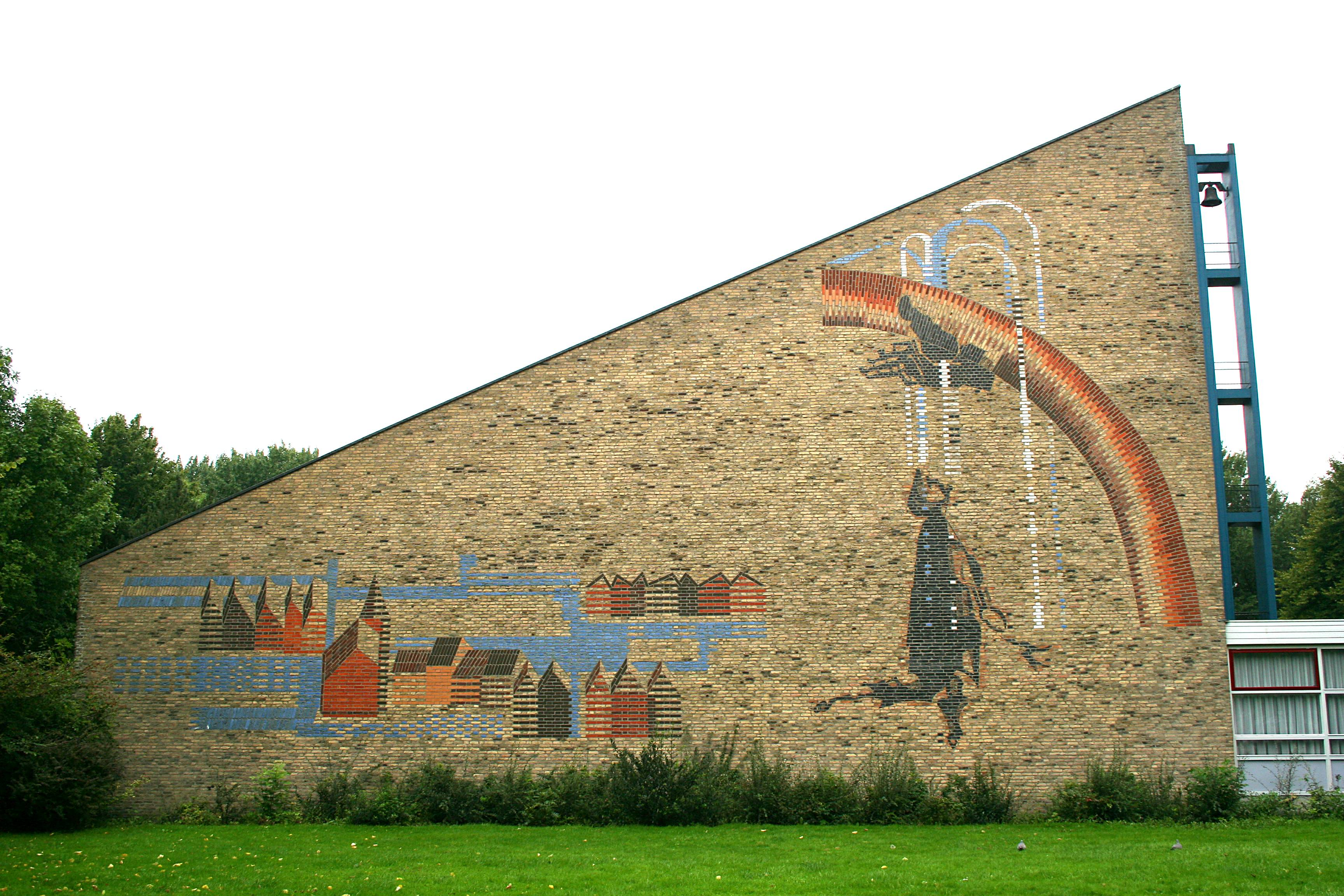
Stone Mosaic church Fountain, Drachten

== See also ==
- List of Dutch ceramists
