= Henryk Milcarz =

Polish politician (born 1950)

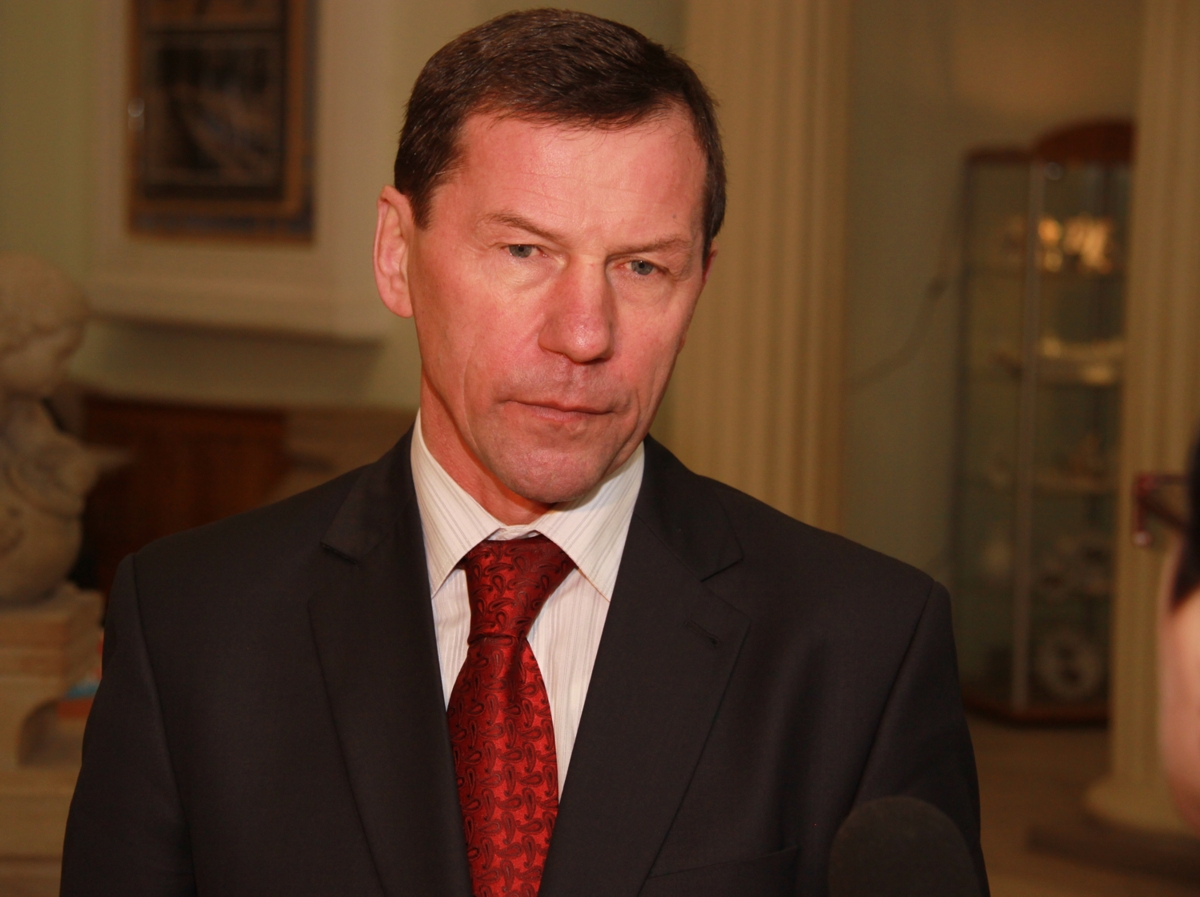

Member of the Sejm
- Incumbent
- Assumed office 25 September 2005
- Constituency: 33 – Kielce

Personal details
- Born: 21 July 1950 (age 75)
- Party: Democratic Left Alliance

Henryk Mieczysław Milcarz (born 21 July 1950 in Zagnańsk) is a Polish politician. He was elected to the Sejm on 25 September 2005, getting 5,251 votes in 33 Kielce district as a candidate from Democratic Left Alliance list.

== See also ==
- Members of Polish Sejm 2005-2007
