= Henrik Jensen =

Henrik Jensen is the name of:

- Henrik Jensen (footballer born 1959), Danish football player and manager
- Henrik Jensen (footballer born 1978), Danish football player
- Henrik Jensen (football manager born 1985), Danish football manager
- Henrik Jensen, Danish jazz bassist and member of the Puppini Sisters
- Henrik Wann Jensen, computer scientist
