= Henno =

Male given name and family name

Henno is both a surname and a given name. Notable people with the name include:

Surname:

- Hubert Henno (born 1976), French volleyball player
- Olivier Henno (born 1962), French politician
- Sass Henno (born 1982), Estonian writer

Given name:

- Henno Althoff (born 1960), German record producer and recording engineer
- Henno Haava (born 1973), Estonian runner
- Henno Jordaan (born 1988), South African cricketer
- Henno Käo (1942–2004), Estonian children's writer, book illustrator, poet and musician
- Henno Martin (1910–1998), German geologist
- Henno Mentz (born 1979), South African rugby union player
- Henno Prinsloo (born 1987), Namibian cricketer

== See also ==
- Schlüssel Henno, German World War II hand-cipher system, see Reservehandverfahren
- Aaron Henneman (born 1980), Australian rules footballer
