= King Hendrick =

King Hendrick or Hendrick Peters may refer to one of two Mohawk leaders who have often been conflated:

- Hendrick Tejonihokarawa (1660 – c.1735), one of the "Four Mohawk Kings"
- Hendrick Theyanoguin (1692–1755), Mohawk leader associated with Sir William Johnson
