= Heiki Vilep =

Estonian writer

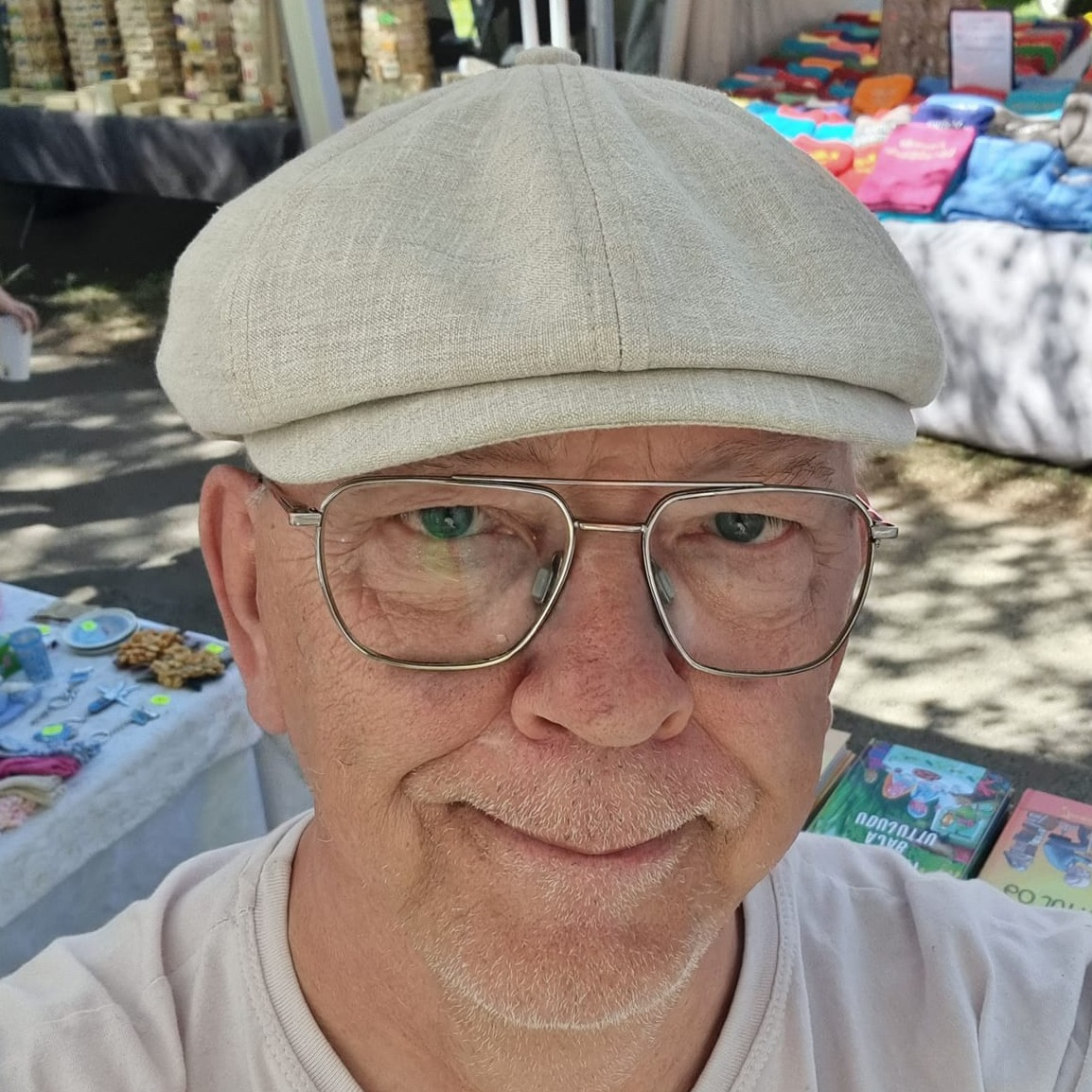
Heiki Vilep in 2024

Heiki Vilep (born 27 March 1960 in Tartu) is an Estonian poet, children's writer and writer.

== Books ==
- Under unconscious – 2001
- Hello! – 2002
- The Monsters of the Closet Door – 2003
- My song – 2003
- Flying Apple Tree – 2003
- The Sounds of Silence – 2004
- Jan's Adventures in Shadowland – 2004
- I want to be – 2005
- Liisu – 2005
- The Monsters of the Closet Door 2 – 2006
- Two of me – 2006
- Liisu 2 – 2006
- Pink Princess – 2006
- Liisu 3 – 2007
- Roof's ride – 2007
- Pillow fight – 2007
- Goblin, Tell-tale and Screeper – 2008
- Horlok and the key of Primeval Gate – 2008
- Clock's Cuckoo – 2008
- Sandman's stories – 2008
- Bearded joke – 2009
- Enchanted city – 2009
- The Monsters of the Closet Door 3 – 2009
- Fear – novel, 2010
- 50 stories and poems to small friends – 2010
- Fear – novel, in russian 2010
- Liisu and the mad house buffet - 2011
- Lost Christmas - in russian 2011
- Over a bottomless abyss - 2011
- Fate Games - novel, 2011
- Loggerhead tree - 2011
- Jõks and five wonderful days - 2012
- Kaappipeikot (The Monsters of the Closet Door, Finnish, Petteri Aarnos, 2013)
- Kaappipeikot Ovat Täällä Taas (The Monsters of the Closet Door 2, Finnish, Petteri Aarnos, 2013)
- Kaappipeikot Planeetta X:llä (The Monsters of the Closet Door 3, Finnish, Petteri Aarnos, 2013)
- Nukku-Matin Höpöjutut (Drowsy Mati's flams, Finnish, Tea Saarinen, 2013)
- Noiduttu Kaupunki (Enchanted city, Finnish, Petteri Aarnos, 2013)
- Tahtoisin Olla (I want to be, Finnish, Gea Karja, Jaana Palanterä, 2013)
- Hei! (Hello!, Finnish, Gea Karja, Jaana Palanterä, 2013)
- Hiljaisuuden Äänet (The Sounds of Silence, Finnish, Petteri Aarnos, 2013)
- Vaaleanpunainen Prinsessa (Pink Princess, Finnish, Petteri Aarnos, 2013)
- Janin Seikkailut Varjomaassa (Jan's Adventures in Shadowland, Finnish, Petteri Aarnos, 2013)
- Lucy (In English, 2015)
- Lucy In A Sand Hole (In English, 2015)
- Lucy Invents A Candle Blower (In English, 2015)
- Lucy and Madhouse Canteen (In English, 2015)
- The Monsters of The Closet Door (In English, 2015)
- Sandman's Stories (In English, 2015)
- The Sounds of Silence (In English, 2015)
- Sandman's New Stories – 2015
- Villiam - 2015
