= John Allen Hendricks =

Professor

Academic background
- Education: University of Southern Mississippi (Ph.D.); University of Arkansas at Little Rock (M.A.); Southern Arkansas University (B.A.)

Academic work
- Discipline: Communication
- Sub-discipline: Political Communication; Social Media; Broadcasting
- Institutions: Stephen F. Austin State University

John Allen Hendricks is an American communication scholar whose research focuses on political communication, social media, broadcasting, and the media industry. He is a professor and chair of the Department of Media and Communication at Stephen F. Austin State University. Hendricks has authored or edited more than 15 books and has received national book awards from the National Communication Association and the Broadcast Education Association.

== Scholarship ==
Much of Hendricks's research has examined the relationship between digital media and American electoral politics. With Robert E. Denton Jr., he edited Communicator-in-Chief: How Barack Obama Used New Media Technology to Win the White House, which examined the Obama campaign's use of emerging digital technologies in the 2008 presidential election and received the National Communication Association's 2011 Distinguished Edited Book Award.

He later co-edited Techno Politics in Presidential Campaigning with Lynda Lee Kaid examining how presidential campaigns used new media and digital technologies to reach and engage voters during the 2008 U.S. presidential election. With Dan Schill, he edited books examining political communication during the 2012 presidential election, the 2014 midterm elections, and the 2016 presidential election. Together, these books examine how candidates, campaigns, news media, and emerging communication technologies shaped political messaging and voter engagement in major U.S. elections from 2012 through 2016.

That line of research continued with Social Media Politics: Digital Discord in the 2020 Presidential Election, co-edited with Schill. The volume examines digital and social media’s role in the 2020 U.S. presidential election, including political communication, citizen engagement, polarization, online activism, and relationships among political actors, citizens, and traditional media.

Hendricks and Schill edited Media Messages in the 2022 Midterm Election: Division, Deniers, Dobbs, and the Donald. The volume examines communication during the 2022 U.S. midterm elections, including the interaction of traditional and digital media, election denial, political messaging, partisan media, social platforms, and campaign communication. Another volume edited by Hendricks and Schill, Political Communication and Digital Advocacy: Strategies and Implications, examines digital political communication, civic engagement, misinformation, polarization, media consumption, and advocacy surrounding the 2020 election and its aftermath.

His broadcasting and radio scholarship includes Radio’s Second Century: Past, Present, and Future Perspectives, which received the Broadcast Education Association’s Book Award in 2022. Other publications include The Palgrave Handbook of Global Radio and, with Bruce Mims, the ninth and tenth editions of Keith’s Radio Station/The Radio Station.

== Editorial and professional activities ==
Hendricks is the series editor of Bloomsbury's Studies in New Media, a scholarly book series focusing on the emergence, adoption, and influence of new media technologies.

He served as president of the Broadcast Education Association (BEA) from 2015 to 2016.

== Selected bibliography ==
=== Political Communication Books ===
- Hendricks, J. A. & Schill, D. (Eds.), Political Communication and Digital Advocacy: Strategies and Implications. (Peter Lang, 2025). ISBN 9783034355643
- Hendricks, J. A. & Schill, D. (Eds.), Media Messages in the 2022 Midterm Election: Division, Deniers, Dobbs, and the Donald. (Routledge, 2025). ISBN 9781032577548
- Schill, D. & Hendricks, J. A. (Eds.), Social Media Politics: Digital Discord in the 2020 Presidential Election. (Routledge, 2024). ISBN 978-1-03-2529615
- Schill, D. & Hendricks, J. A. (Eds.), The Presidency and Social Media: Discourse, Disruption, and Digital Democracy in the 2016 Presidential Election. (Routledge, 2018). ISBN 9781786848239
- Hendricks, J. A. & Schill, D. (Eds.), Communication and Midterm Elections: Media, Message, and Mobilization. (Palgrave, 2016). ISBN 9781137488015
- Hendricks, J. A. & Schill, D. (Eds.), Presidential Campaigning and Social Media: An Analysis of the 2012 Election. (Oxford, 2015). ISBN 9780199355846
- Hendricks, J. A. & Kaid, L. L. (Eds.), Techno Politics in Presidential Campaigning: New Voices, New Technologies and New Voters. (Routledge, 2011). ISBN 9781136968204
- Hendricks, J. A. & Denton, R. E. Jr. (Eds.), Communicator-in-Chief: How Barack Obama Used New Media Technology to Win the White House. (Lexington, 2010). ISBN 9780739141076

=== Social Media Books ===
- Noor Al-Deen, H., & Hendricks, J. A. (Eds.), Social Media and Strategic Communications. (Palgrave, 2013). ISBN 9781137287052
- Noor-Al Deen, H., & Hendricks, J. A. (Eds.), Social Media: Usage and Impact. (Lexington, 2011). ISBN 9780739167298

=== Media Industry Books ===
- Hendricks, J.A. (Ed.), Radio's Second Century: Past, Present, and Future Perspectives. (Rutgers University Press, 2020). ISBN 9780813598468
- Hendricks, J. A., & Mims, B. The Radio Station: Broadcasting, Podcasting, and Streaming. (Routledge, 2018). ISBN 9781138218819
- Hendricks, J. A., & Mims, B. Keith’s Radio Station: Broadcast, Satellite, and Internet. (Focal Press, 2015). ISBN 9781136027857
- Hendricks, J. A. (Ed.), The Palgrave Handbook of Global Radio. (Palgrave, 2012). ISBN 9780230293076
- Hendricks, J. A. (Ed.), The Twenty-First-Century Media Industry: Economic and Managerial Implications in the Age of New Media. (Lexington, 2010). ISBN 9780739140055
