= Henrik Vuornos =

Finnish politician (born 1993)

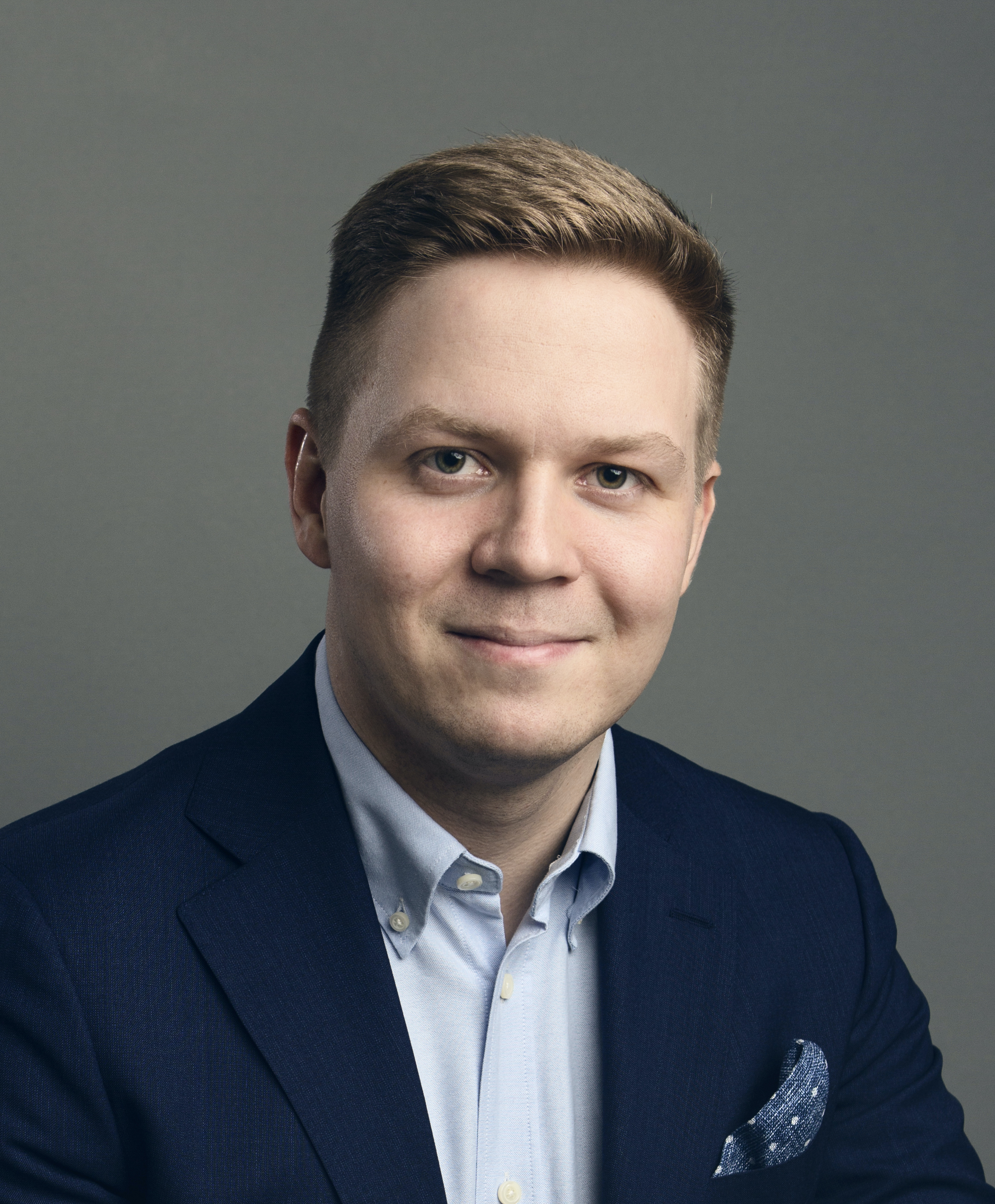
- Vuornos in 2021

Member of the Parliament of Finland
- Incumbent
- Assumed office 24 January 2025
- Preceded by: Kai Mykkänen
- Constituency: Uusimaa

Personal details
- Born: 27 June 1993 (age 32)
- Party: National Coalition Party

Henrik Jeremias Vuornos (born 27 June 1993) is a Finnish politician serving as a member of the Parliament of Finland since 2025. From 2021 to 2023, he served as chairman of the city council of Espoo.
