= Henri de Gondi =

Henri de Gondi may refer to:

- Henri de Gondi (cardinal) (1572–1622), French bishop and cardinal of Retz
- Henri de Gondi, duc de Retz (1590–1659), French noble, nephew of the above
