= Hendricks Township =

Hendricks Township may refer to:

- Hendricks Township, Shelby County, Indiana
- Hendricks Township, Chautauqua County, Kansas
- Hendricks Township, Michigan
- Hendricks Township, Lincoln County, Minnesota
