= Henrik Holm =

Henrik Holm may refer to:

- Henrik Holm (tennis) (born 1968), Swedish tennis player
- Henrik Holm (actor) (born 1995), Norwegian actor
- Henrik Holm (ice hockey) (born 1990), Norwegian ice hockey player
