= Henrik Bull (disambiguation) =

Henrik Bull (1864–1953) was a Norwegian architect.

Henrik Bull may also refer to:

- Henrik Bull (judge) (born 1957), Norwegian judge
- Henrik H. Bull (1929–2013), American architect
- Henrik Johan Bull (1844–1930), Norwegian polar explorer

== See also ==
- Henry Bull
