= Henrik Pedersen =

Henrik Pedersen may refer to:

- Henrik Pedersen (footballer) (born 1975), Danish footballer
- Henrik Pedersen (football manager) (born 1978), Danish football manager
- Henrik Pedersen (cyclist) (born 2004), Danish cyclist
- Henrik Bolberg Pedersen (born 1960), Danish trumpeter and flugelhorn player
