= Hendrick Cottage =

Historic building in Connecticut

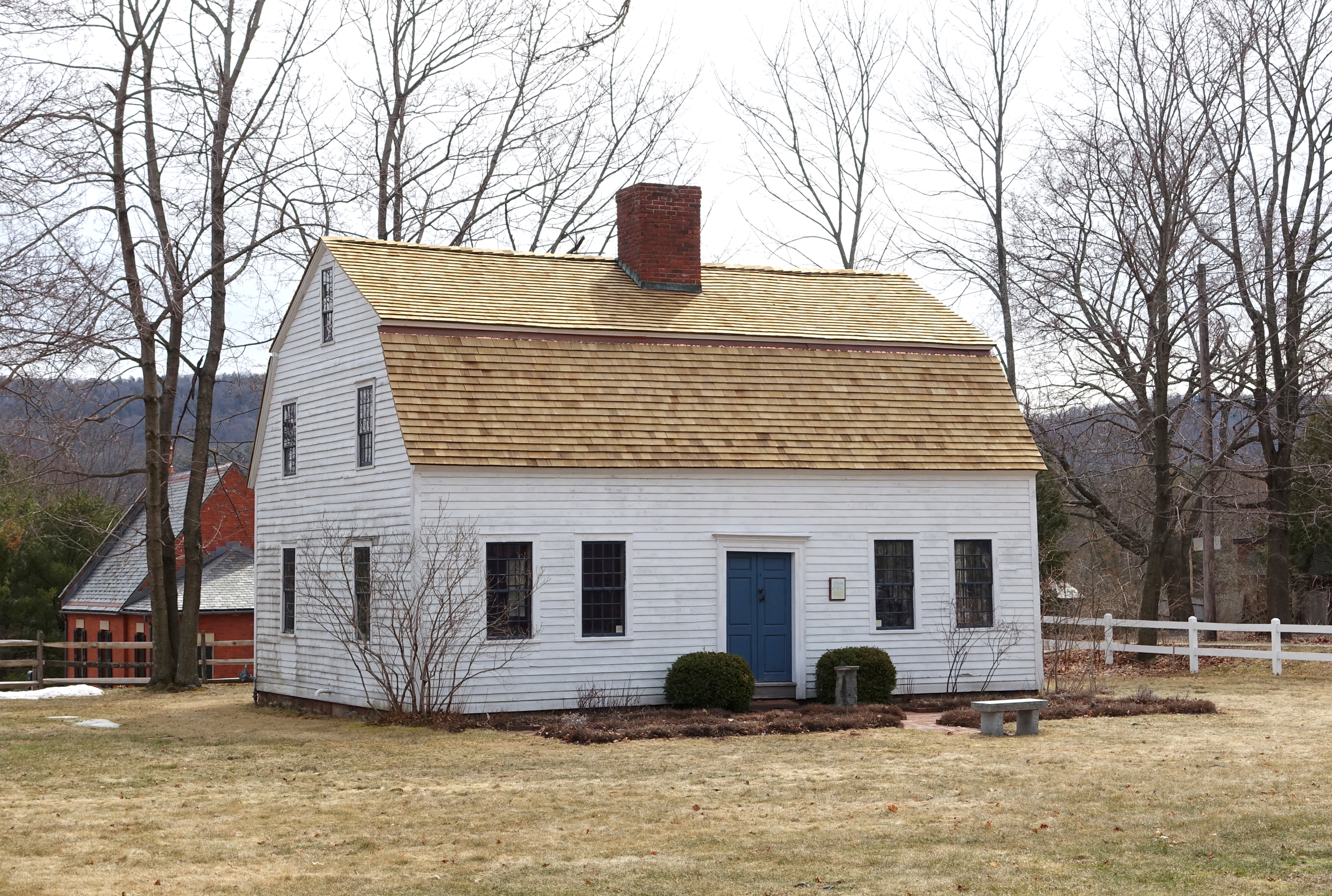
- The cottage in 2015
- Interactive map of the Hendrick Cottage area

General information
- Location: Simsbury, Connecticut, United States
- Coordinates: 41.875783°N 72.800836°W
- Completed: c. 1795 (231 years ago)

Technical details
- Floor count: 1.5

Hendrick Cottage is a historic building in Simsbury, Connecticut, United States. Dating to around 1795, it is believed to have been built by John Poisson. In 1965, it was moved half a mile from its original location (on the north bank of Hop Brook facing West Street) to become part of the collection of nine buildings comprising the Massacoh Plantation, part of Simsbury Center Historic District. It is named for its last owner, Fanny Josephine Pomeroy Hendrick. It is a contributing property to the Simsbury Center Historic District.

== Gallery ==
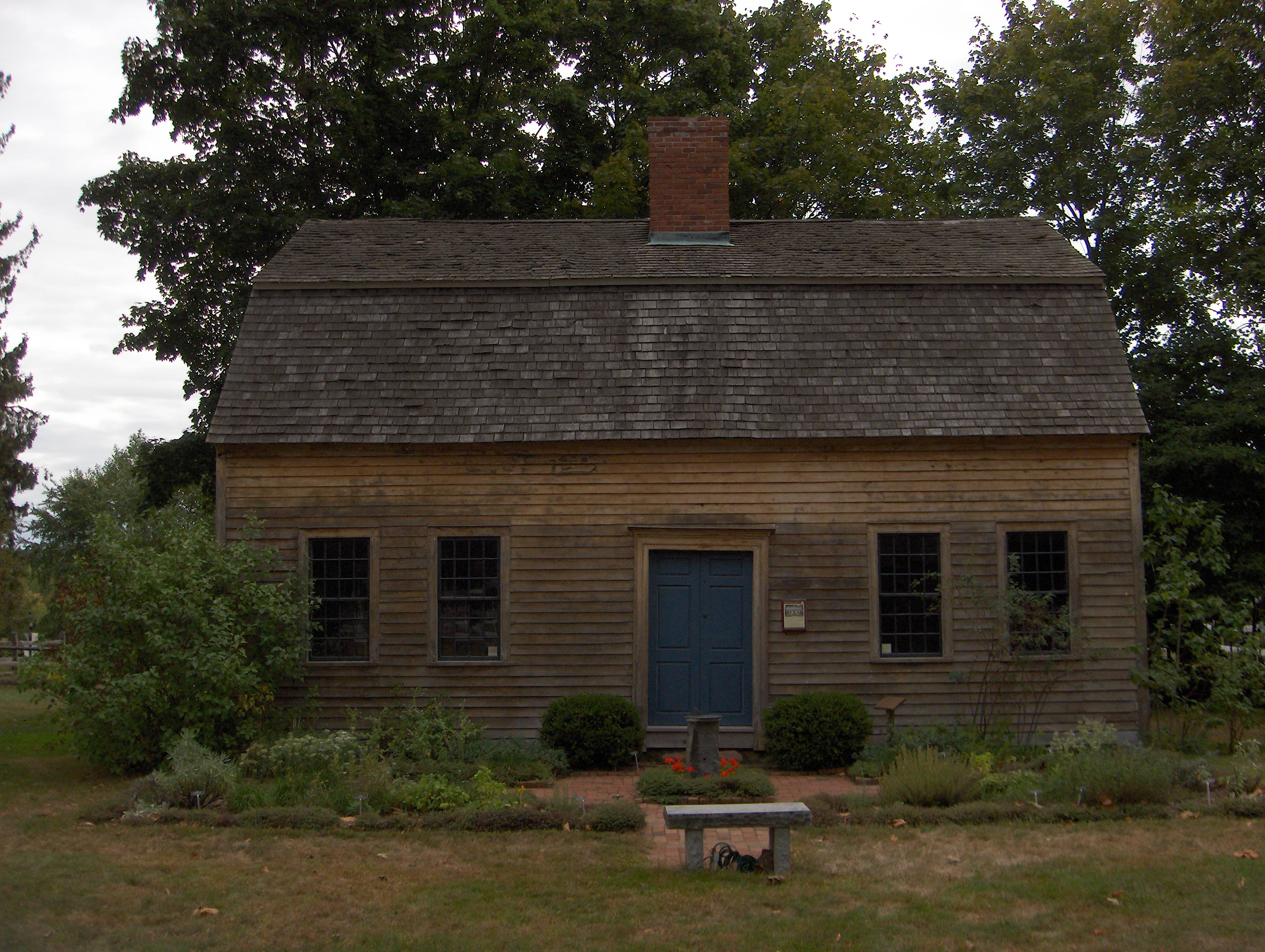
The building in 2010

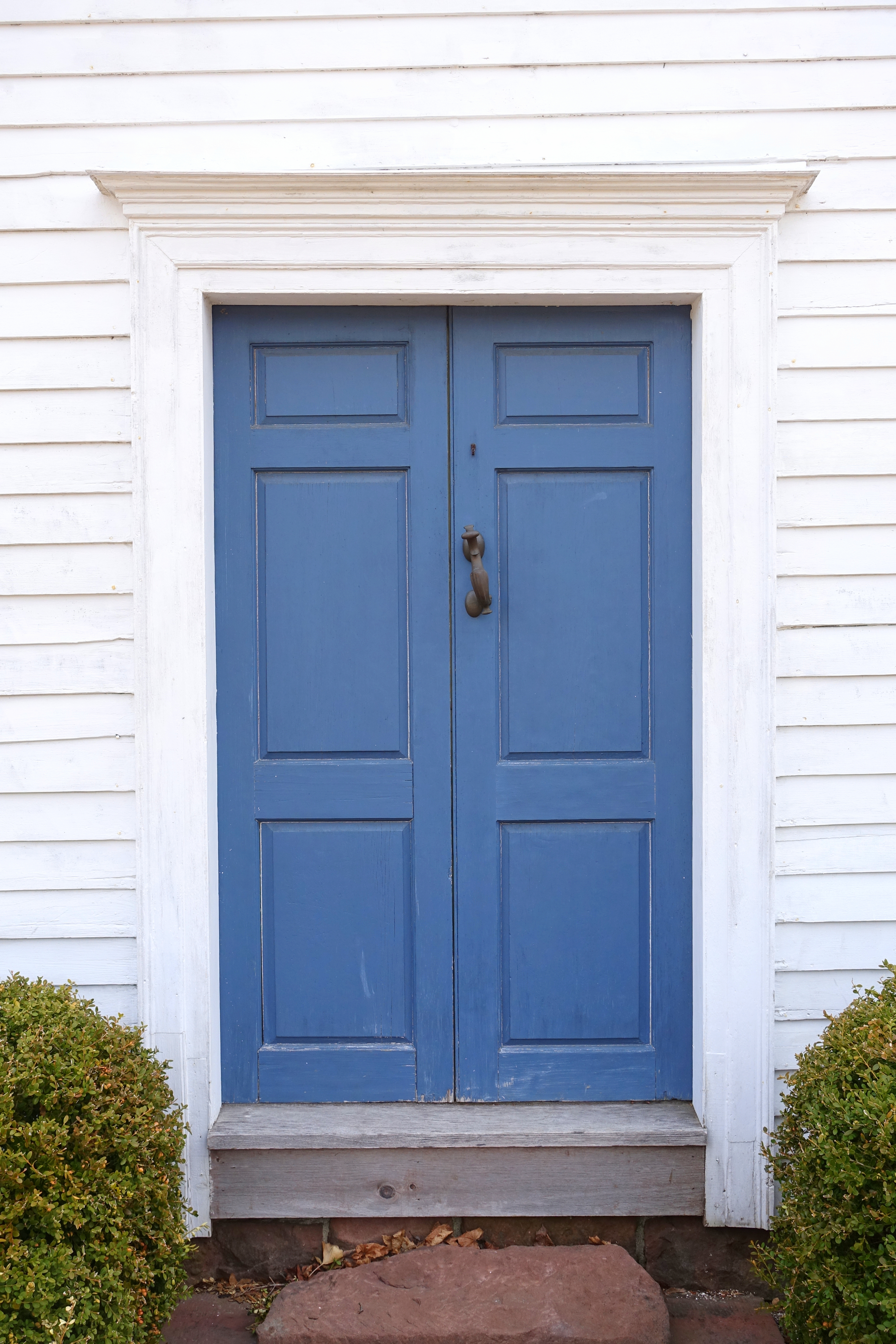
Front door
