= Heike =

Heike may refer to:

- Heike (name), a (not exclusively) feminine given name and a surname
- Taira clan, sometimes referred to as "Heike"
- Heike crab, a species of crab named after the Taira (Heike) clan
- Heike Ondo, a Japanese folk song
- Heike Shamisen, a Japanese musical instrument
- The Tale of the Heike, an epic account of clan struggle
