= Enn Säde =

Estonian film sound operator and film director

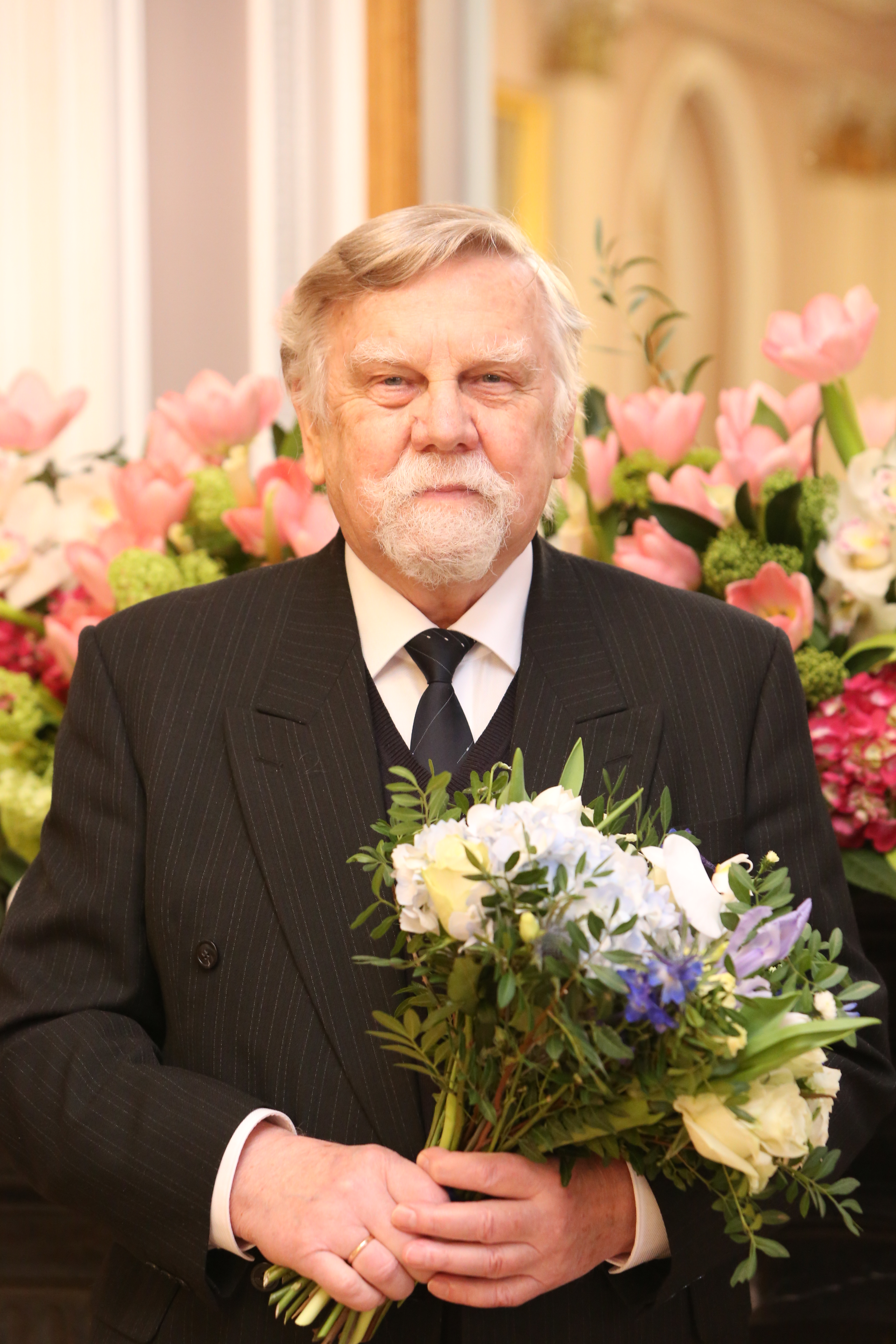
Enn Säde in 2021

Enn Säde (born 18 October 1938 in Pärnu) is an Estonian film sound designer and film director.

In 1961 he graduated from Leningrad Institute of Film Engineers ( Estonian: Leningradi Kinoinseneride Instituut Russian: Ленинградский институт киноинженеров ).

Since 1961 he worked at Tallinnfilm. Since 1993 he is a freelance sound designer.

Awards:

- 1990: nominated to Nika Award
- 2001: Order of the White Star, V class.

== Filmography ==
- 1969 "Uksed"
- 1980 "Metskannikesed"
- 1981 "Nukitsamees"
- 1984 "Karoliine hõbelõng"
- 1985 "Naerata ometi"
