= Alfred Haddrick =

Australian cricketer

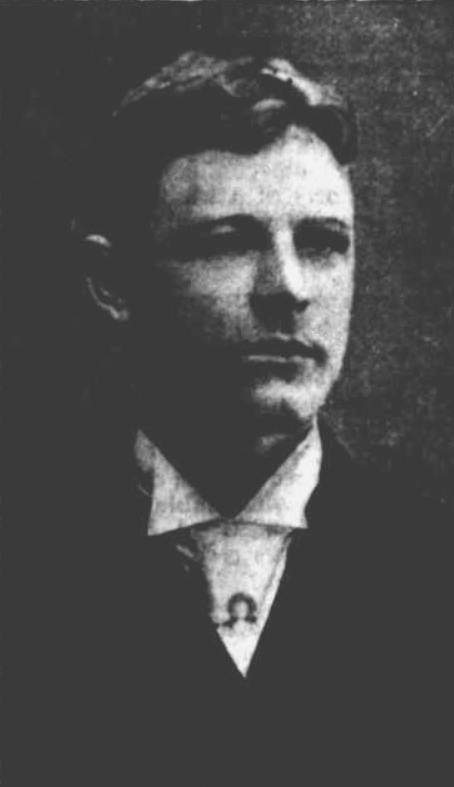

Personal information
- Born: 14 July 1868; Adelaide, Australia
- Died: 15 February 1939 (aged 70); Brisbane, Australia

Domestic team information
- Years: Team
- 1893: Victoria
- Source: Cricinfo, 26 July 2015

Alfred Haddrick (14 July 1868 – 15 February 1939) was an Australian cricketer who was an all-rounder. He played two first-class cricket matches for Victoria in 1893.

== Cricket career ==
Haddrick began his cricket career in South Australia and as of November 1884 through to January 1885 he was playing for the Bridgewater club. In October 1885 he was playing for North Park club.

Haddrick moved to Victoria in the late 1880s and joined the Richmond Cricket Club and in the 1888/89 season he averaged 14.06 with the ball which was the best for the club, and in May 1890 he was described as doing the "lion's share" of bowling for the club alongside W. Over. He was awarded the Richmond club prize for best all-round play for Richmond for the 1889/90 season. As of June 1891 he was honorary secretary of the Richmond Cricket Club.

In April 1892 Haddrick was noted to have improved as an all-rounder and for the season he was averaging 48.6 with the bat from thirteen innings and 13.24 with the ball with 45 wickets making him Richmond's best batsman and bowler. In April 1893 he made his First-class debut when he was selected to represent Victoria against Western Australia in an Intercolonial match at the MCG, which Victoria won by an innings with Haddrick taking four wickets in the first innings but not bowling in the second innings. In 1894 he played for the Melbourne Cricket Club, however by 1895 he was back at Richmond serving on the Richmond Skittles club committee and playing for the cricket team which had dropped to the B Division of club cricket.

In September 1895 Haddrick received a gold lace badge from the Victorian Cricket Association at the Richmond club annual meeting. He suffered a lengthy illness in the mid-1890's and in 1897 his absence from the Richmond side was noted as he had moved to Sydney for his health. By 1901 he had returned to Melbourne and was serving as a Councilor of the Richmond Cricket Club, and he continued to serve as Councilor for 1902. He departed Melbourne in the 1900s and traveled before settling in Brisbane as of 1908 which he described as a "grand place" with Cricket being "in full swing."

== Personal life ==
Haddrick married Jane Field of Lancefield. She died at the age of 27 in 1901. He later remarried to Catherine Marion who died in 1946.

Haddrick was arrested in Brisbane in December 1920 as he was accused of stealing approximately two pounds from a J.H. Carmichael while working for him as a servant and because there was a deficiency of 270 pounds in the accounts of Carmichael and Co. for the period he was working for the company, and in 1921 he was taken to court. The judge ruled that when examined in detail there was no discrepancy in the company accounts, although Haddrick had not accounted all amounts he had received while working for the company.

In 1930 he was badly injured in a car accident between a taxi and a car, suffering internal injuries and being in a serious condition after the accident. He died in South Brisbane in 1939 and was buried in Toowong Cemetery.

== See also ==
- List of Victoria first-class cricketers
