= Hendrikx =

Hendrikx is a surname. Notable people with the surname include:

- Jan Hendrikx (mayor) (born 1944), Dutch mayor
- Marc Hendrikx (born 1974), Belgian football player

== See also ==
- Jimi Hendrix
- Hendric
- Hendrick (disambiguation)
- Hendricks (disambiguation)
- Hendrickx
- Hendrik (disambiguation)
- Hendriks
- Hendrix (disambiguation)
- Hendryx
- Henrik
- Henry (disambiguation)
- Henryk (given name)
