= Margo Hendricks =

American literary scholar & novelist (born 1948)

- Born: 1948 (age 77–78)

Academic background
- Education: UC Riverside

Academic work
- Discipline: English Literature; Shakespeare; Theatre Studies
- Institutions: UC Santa Cruz

Margo Hendricks (pen name, Elysabeth Grace; born 1948) is an American professor emerita of literature at University of California, Santa Cruz. Her research focuses on race and culture in literature.

== Career ==
Hendricks was awarded a doctorate from the University of California, Riverside in 1987, with a thesis titled 'The Roaring Girls: A Study of 17th Century Feminism and the Development of Feminist Drama'. She worked at San Jose State University before joining University of California, Santa Cruz, where she is Professor Emerita of Renaissance and Early Modern English Literature. She has held ACLS fellowships and in 1990-91 the Ford Fellowship at the Stanford Centre for Humanities. In 2020-21 she will be a Folger Institute Research Fellow. Since becoming emerita in 2010, she has also written fiction under the name Elysabeth Grace.

== Select publications ==
- Hendricks, M. 1992. "Managing the Barbarian: "The Tragedy of Dido, Queen of Carthage", Renaissance Drama 23, 165–188. doi:10.1086/rd.23.41917288
- Hendricks, M. and Parker, P. 1994. Women,'Race' and Writing in the Early Modern Period. doi:10.4324/9780203388891
- Hendricks, M. 1996. "‘The Moor of Venice,’or the Italian on the Renaissance English Stage." Shakespearean Tragedy and Gender, pp. 193–209.
- Hendricks, M. 1996. “‘Obscured by Dreams’: Race, Empire, and Shakespeare's A Midsummer Night's Dream.” Shakespeare Quarterly, vol. 47, no. 1, 1996, pp. 37–60.
- Hendricks, M. 2010. "Race: A Renaissance Category?". A Companion to English Renaissance Literature and Culture, 2, pp. 535–44.
- Hendricks, M. 2016. "'A word, sweet Lucrece': Confession, Feminism, and The Rape of Lucrece", in D. Callaghan ed. A Feminist Companion to Shakespeare, 2nd, ed.
