= Hendriksen =

Hendriksen and Hendrikse are Dutch patronymic surnames ("son of Hendrik"). People with the name include:

Hendriksen

- Arne Hendriksen (1911–1996), Norwegian-Swedish ceramic artist and opera singer
- Roy Hendriksen (born 1969), Dutch football player and manager
- Theo Hendriksen (1907–2001), Dutch auxiliary bishop
- Ulrik Hendriksen (1891–1960), Danish-Norwegian painter and graphic artis
- William Hendriksen (1900–1982), American New Testament scholar

Hendrikse

- Klaas Hendrikse (1947–2018), Dutch atheist pastor
- Maryke Hendrikse (born 1979), Bahamian-Canadian voice actress

== See also ==
- Hendriks
- Hendriksen Strait in Canada
