= Henrik Jørgensen =

Henrik Jørgensen may refer to:

- Henrik Jørgensen (runner) (1961–2019), Danish marathon runner
- Henrik Jørgensen (footballer) (born 1966), Danish former footballer
- Henrik Jorgensen (Paralympian) (fl. 1980s), Danish Paralympic track & field and boccia athlete
