= Clyde Allen Hendrix =

American musician (1934–2021)

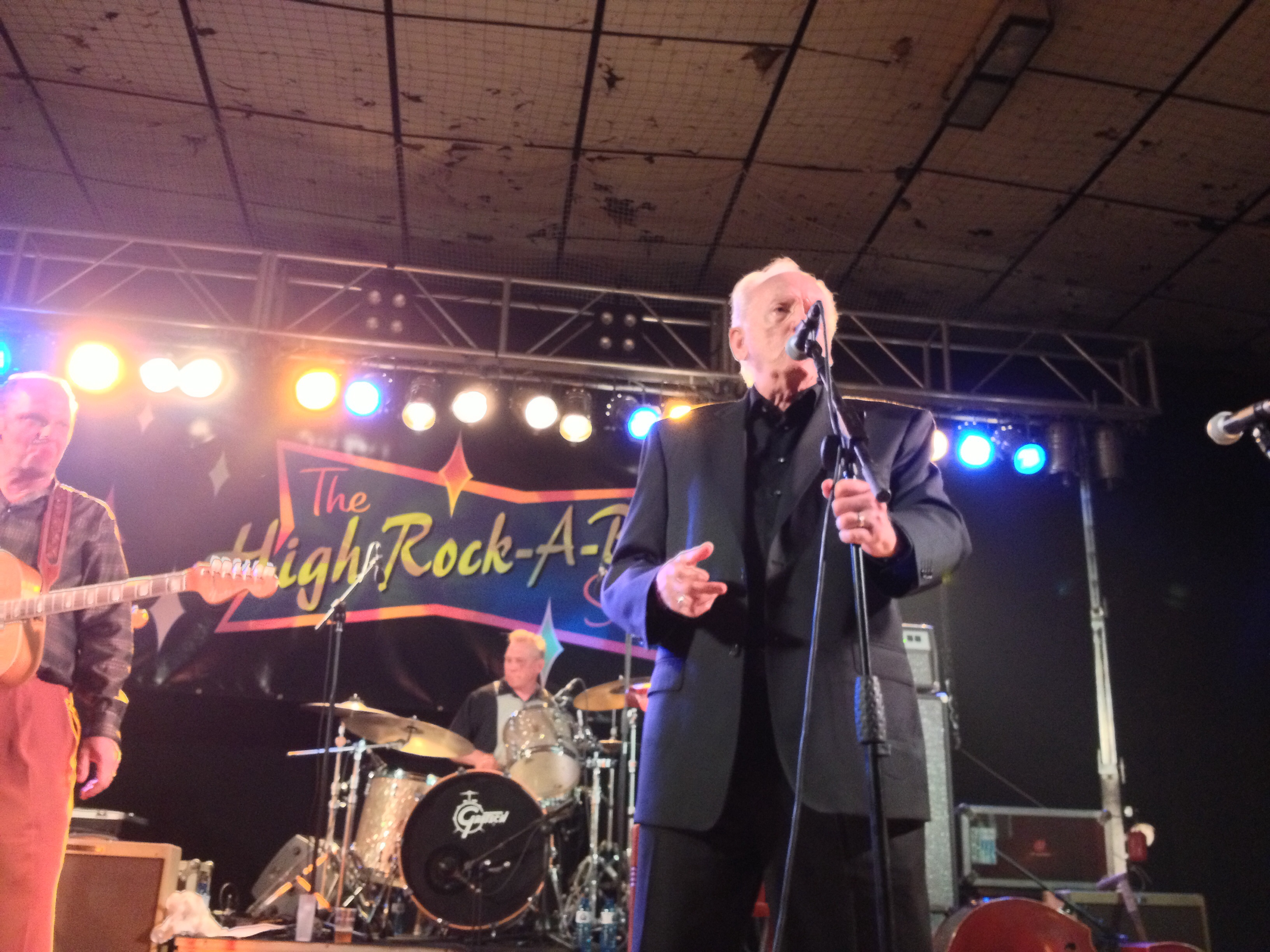
Al performing in CalaFell Spain September 6, 2013

Clyde Allen Hendrix (November 12, 1934 – July 23, 2021), also known as Al Hendrix, was an American rockabilly singer and songwriter.

== Career ==
Hendrix was born November 12, 1934. He began performing in clubs around Bakersfield, California, and met Buck Owens at the legendary Blackboard Cafe. Hendrix and Owens played music together, often with Bill Woods and The Orange Blossom Playboys. Hendrix made his television debut on the Los Angeles-based show "Rocket To Stardom".

In 1957, Joe Keplinger (a.k.a. Jolly Jody) hired Hendrix as lead singer for his group, Jolly Jody and The Go Daddies. With the Go Daddies, Hendrix recorded "Rhonda Lee" and "Go Daddy Rock" for the Tally label. The two singles were picked up by ABC-Paramount Records in 1959. Hendrix also appeared on Cousin Herb Henson's TV show, "Trading Post Gang".

LaGree Records issued "I Need You" and "Young and Wild" in 1960. Liberty Records leased them for nationwide release. "I Need You" was a number one hit in El Paso, Texas for 6 weeks. Around the same time, Alan Freed played the flipside "Young and Wild" every hour on his radio show in Los Angeles. "I Need You" also made the top 20 in San Diego.

Hendrix appeared on the Wink Martindale television show at Pacific Ocean Beach and at Art Laboe's show at the Pasadena Civic Auditorium in Pasadena, California.

"Monkey Bite" and "For Sentimental Reasons" were released in 1962 on Pike Records. "Monkey Bite" was banned from some radio stations for being too risqué. Two more tracks recorded at Pike, "Jumpin' Johnny" and "Fooling Around" were not issued until 1985 on the White label in the Netherlands.

Hendrix appeared on early Bakersfield television shows hosted by Jimmy Thomason. His band Al and The Country Mixers performed on radio, TV, and at entertainment centers in the area.

In 1971, he released two more songs on LaGree, "Georgia Kate" and "Wait Until You Get a Whiff of My After Shave Lotion" (also called "Mixing Fun" and "Shaving lotion".)

In 2003, Bear Family Records issued That'll Flat Git It: Volume 13: Rockabilly From The Vaults Of ABC Records which includes the Hendrix song "Rhonda Lee". Hendrix songs also are in various artist collections from Buffalo Bop Records, World Music Distribution, Lucky, Teen Beat, Membran Music, and Mustang Records.

In 2007 Hummingbird Records released new Hendrix originals "Good Girl I Ain't Got", "When I'm loving You", "Rainbow's End", "Diabetic Man", "The DJ", "I Can Tell", "Cock Fighter", and "The Answer To It All" on the CD Rare and Rockin', along with some of his older material.

In 2009 Hendrix came out with Rockabilly Lovin', a CD of all new original songs. A love songs CD, Lover Boy, is being released in 2012.

Hendrix was recognized as a Rockabilly Legend by the Rockabilly Hall of Fame in 2008.

Hendrix performed at the Buck Owens Crystal Palace in Bakersfield on February 13, 2010. He performed at the Viva Las Vegas rockabilly festival in April, 2011.

Hendrix performed at The High Rockabilly Festival in Calafell, Spain on September 6, 2013.

Hendrix died on July 23, 2021.

== Discography ==
- "Rhonda Lee" and "Go Daddy Rock" (ABC Paramount 1959)
- "I Need You" and "Young and Wild" (Liberty Records 1960)
- "Monkey Bite" and "For Sentimental Reasons" (Pike Records 1962)
- "Georgia Kate" and "Wait Until You Get a Whiff of My After Shave Lotion" (LaGree Records 1971)
- "Jumpin' Johnny" and "Fooling Around" (White Label 1985)
- Teenage Repression (Various Artists, World Music Distribution 1993)
- Young and Wild (Various Artists, Buffalo Bop Records 1994)
- Rockabilly Gold, Volume 3 (Various Artists, Lucky Records 1996)
- That'll Flat Git It: Volume 13: Rockabilly From The Vaults Of ABC Records (Bear Family Records 2003)
- Play It Cool (Various Artists, Teen Beat Records 2004)
- Rock-A-Billy, Rock and Roll & Hillbilly (Various Artists, Membran Music 2011)
- Rockin' Jive & Stroll, Volume 12: Oh Oh Rock! (Various Artists, Mustang Records)
- Rare and Rockin' (Hummingbird Records 2007)
- Rockabilly Lovin' (Hummingbird Records 2009)
- Lover Boy (Hummingbird Records 2012)
