= Henrik Nilsson =

Henrik Nilsson may refer to:

- Henrik Nilsson (canoeist) (born 1976), Swedish former sprint canoer
- Henrik Nilsson (ice hockey, born 1970), Swedish retired ice hockey player
- Henrik Nilsson (ice hockey, born 1991), Swedish ice hockey player
- Henrik Nilsson (footballer) (born 1972), Swedish former footballer
- Henrik Nilsson (rower) (born 1969), Swedish Olympic rower
