= Jules Hendrickx =

Belgian cyclist

Personal information
- Born: 9 September 1899
- Died: 19 January 1973 (aged 73)

Cycling career
- Sport: Cycling
- Discipline: Road
- Role: Rider

Jules Hendrickx (9 September 1899 – 19 January 1973) was a Belgian racing cyclist. He rode in the 1928 Tour de France.
