= Enn Meri =

Estonian politician (born 1942)

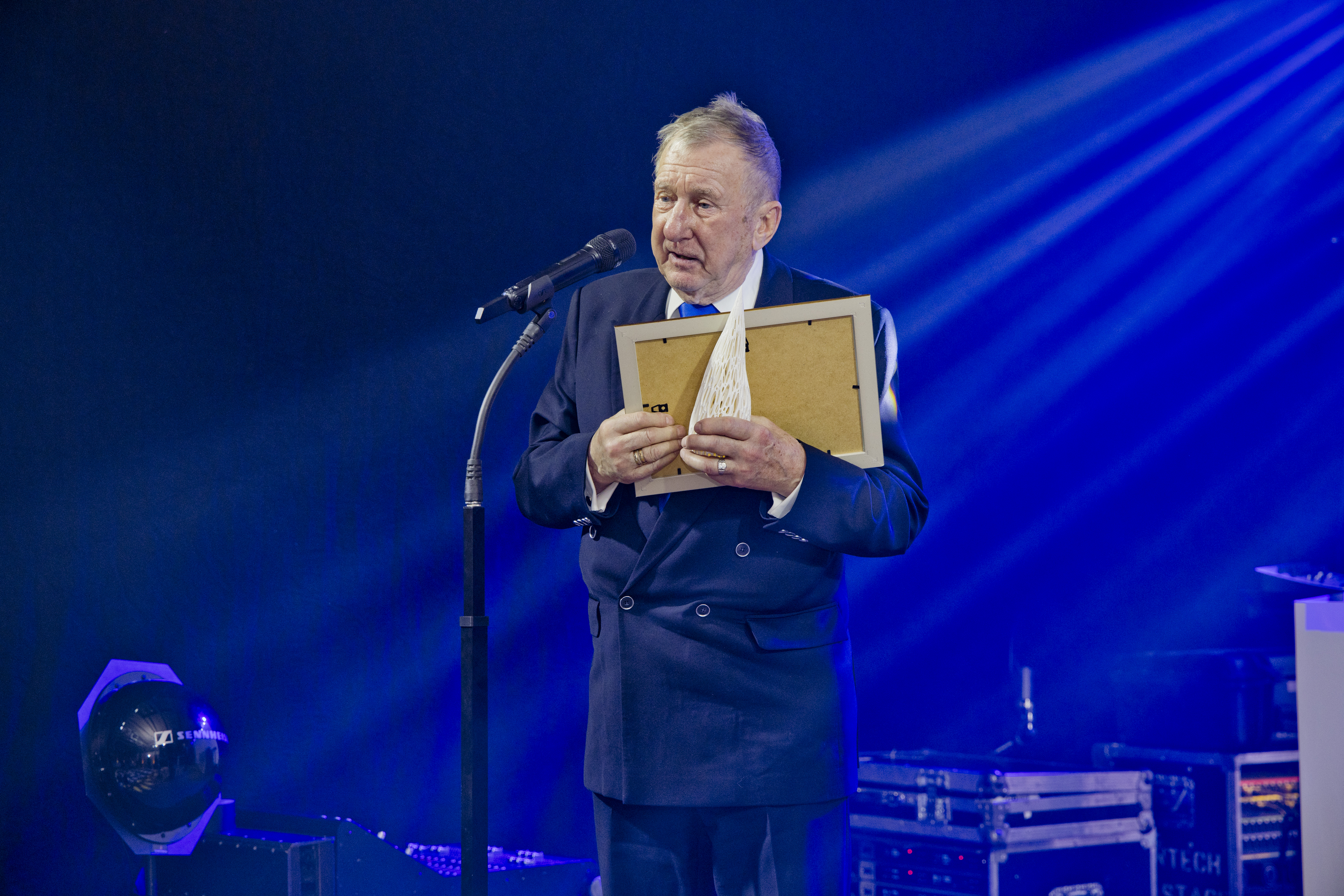
Enn Meri in 2022

Enn Meri (born 15 January 1942) is an Estonian politician. He was a member of the XIII Riigikogu.
