= Heike Langguth =

Heike Langguth (born 22 October 1979) is a German two times vice-champion in Muay Thai.

== Sports career ==
Heike Langguth began her athletic career as a boxer and trained a little later in Weimar kickboxing. In 2004, she started at the 1 SSV Hall Field 92 eV with Muay Thai. That same year she became German Vice-champion and could repeat their success 2005th In 2006, she founded the association 'Bareknuckle eV', which operates a training center for Muay Thai, Kickboxing and traditional Boxing Eckartsberga malls village. Langguth works as a trainer and is effective for the training center Bareknuckle Gym Germany; at international competitions in Muay Thai and kickboxing.

== Former connections to the extreme right Neo-pagan music scene ==
Sources at the anti-fascist movement has been repeatedly pointed out that Heike Langguth was active in the extreme right-wing of the black metal scene. Together with her then-boyfriend Ronald Möbus, singer of Germany's most infamous Black metal and Pagan metal band Absurd and older brother of the band and founder Hendrik Möbus. Möbus and Langguth founded the pagan metal record label Nebelfee Klangwerke (now Nebelklang and no longer run by either of them but now by Robert Ullrich)(to the successor label fog sound it is no longer involved), and a mail order and retail shop for New Age and Neo-Pagans article and right-wing literature.

For a solidarity campaign for the detainees at the time Hendrik Moebus is Langguth have acted as the owner of the donation account.

In addition, she was 1998-2002 editor of the extreme right fanzines 'Germanenorden' (German Order) and contact person of the "Germanischen Freyfrauen Bundes" (GFFB), worked closely with the extreme right and neo-pagan Deutsche Heidnische Front (DHF). It belonged to the neo-pagan Artgemeinschaft - Germanic Faith Community Association; to the well-known right-wing extremist Jürgen Rieger.

Langguth organized concerts with neo-Nazi black metal bands such as Funeral (France)), Magog (Pirna), Totenburg and Absurd.

Criticism provoked including an interview with Langguth in the Saalfeld city magazine Marcus; in which she is pictured on the cover with a tattoo that showed the symbol of Schwarze Sonne.

Since 2003, Langguth, according to her own data, is not involved with far-right activities, since then there would be no staff or organisational links between Langguth and the far-right scene.

== Literature ==
- Christian Dornbusch/Hans-Peter Killguss: Unheilige Allianzen. Black Metal zwischen Satanismus, Heidentum und Neonazismus, rat (reihe antifaschistischer texte), Unrast Verlag, Hamburg/Münster 2005.
