= Henri =

Male given name

Henri (/ɒnˈriː/ ahn-REE) is the French form of the masculine given name Henry, also in Estonian, Finnish, German and Luxembourgish. Bearers of the given name include:

== People ==
=== French nobles ===
- Henri I de Montmorency (1534–1614), Marshal and Constable of France
- Henri I, Duke of Nemours (1572–1632), the son of Jacques of Savoy and Anna d'Este
- Henri II, Duke of Nemours (1625–1659), the seventh Duc de Nemours
- Henri, Count of Harcourt (1601–1666), French nobleman
- Henri, Dauphin of Viennois (1296–1349), bishop of Metz
- Henri de Gondi (disambiguation)
- Henri de La Tour d'Auvergne, Duke of Bouillon (1555–1623), member of the powerful House of La Tour d'Auvergne
- Henri Emmanuel Boileau, baron de Castelnau (1857–1923), French mountain climber
- Henri, Grand Duke of Luxembourg (born 1955), the head of state of Luxembourg from 2000 until his abdication in 2025
- Henri de Massue, Earl of Galway (1648–1720), French Huguenot soldier and diplomat, one of the principal commanders of Battle of Almansa
- François-Henri de Montmorency, duc de Luxembourg (1628–1695), French general, marshal of France, one of the principal commanders of Battle of Steenkerque
- Henri, Prince of Condé (1552–1588), French Prince du Sang and Huguenot general
- Henri, Prince of Condé (1588–1646), member of the reigning House of Bourbon
- Henri de La Tour d'Auvergne, Viscount of Turenne (1611–1675), French Marshal General and one of the principal commanders of Thirty Years' War
- Prince Henri, Count of Paris (1908–1999), claimant to the throne of France from 1940 until his death
- Prince Henri, Count of Paris, Duke of France (1933–2019), claimant to the French throne
- Prince Henri Marie Jean André de Laborde de Monpezat (1934–2018), Prince Consort to Queen Margrethe II of Denmark

=== Others ===
- Henri Aalto (born 1989), Finnish footballer
- Henri Anspach (1882–1979), Belgian Olympic champion épée and foil fencer
- Henri Anier (born 1990), Estonian footballer
- Henri Ardel (1863-1938), French writer
- Henri Arnaut de Zwolle (1400-1466), Dutch physician, astronomer, astologer and organist
- Henri Becquerel (1852–1908), French physicist who discovered radioactivity
- Henri Bergson (1859–1941), French philosopher
- Henri Mathias Berthelot (1861–1931), French general during World War I
- Henri Bertini (1798–1876), French classical composer and pianist
- Henri Betti (1917–2005), French composer and pianist
- Henri Beunke (1851–1925), Dutch writer
- Henri Bienvenu (born 1988), Cameroonian footballer
- Henri Boério (born 1952), French former gymnast
- Henri Bol (1945–2000), Dutch still life painter
- Henri Cappetta, French ichthyologist
- Henri Cartan (1904–2008), French mathematician
- Henri Cartier-Bresson (1908–2004), French photographer considered to be the father of modern photojournalism
- Henri Casadesus (1879–1947), French violist and music publisher
- Henri Cassini (1781–1832), French botanist and naturalist
- Henri Charriere (1906–1973), French author
- Henri Coandă (1886–1972), Romanian inventor, aerodynamics pioneer and builder of an experimental aircraft
- Henri Cohen (water polo) (died 1930), Belgian water polo Olympic silver medalist
- Henri Cordier (1849–1925), French linguist and historian
- Henri Cordier (1856–1877), French mountain climber
- Henri de la Rochejaquelein (1772–1794), French loyalist and commander of the Vendeans resistance during civil wars in France
- Henri Drell (born 2000), Estonian basketball player
- Henri Dufaux (1879–1980), Swiss painter
- Henri Duvanel (1896–1953), French Olympic water polo player
- Henri Estienne (1528 or 1531–1598), Parisian printer and classical scholar
- Henri Farman (1874–1958), French aviator and aircraft designer and manufacturer
- Henri-Nicolas Frey (1847–1932), French general, one of the principal commanders of Boxer Rebellion, Gaselee Expedition and Battle of Beijing
- Henri Giraud (1879–1949), French general, best known for being a commander of the Free French Forces in the Second World War
- Henri Gouraud (1867–1946), French general, best known for his leadership of the French Fourth Army at the end of the First World War
- Henri Grob (1904–1974), Swiss chess player
- Henri Häkkinen (born 1980), Finnish sport shooter
- F. Henri Henriod (1905–1986), justice of the Utah Supreme Court
- Henri Järvelaid (born 1998), Estonian footballer
- Henri Kanninen (born 1994), Finnish ice hockey player
- Henri Kichka (1926–2020), Belgian writer and Holocaust survivor
- Henri Koba (1936–2005), Central African diplomat and journalist
- Henri Kontinen (born 1990), Finnish tennis player
- Henri Krasucki (1924–2003), French trade unionist
- Henri Le Masne (1919–1954), Formerly missing person
- Henri Lansbury (born 1990), English footballer
- Henri Lebesgue (1875–1941), French mathematician
- Henri Leconte (born 1963), French professional tennis player
- Henri Legay (1920–1992), French operatic tenor
- Henri Lehmann (1814–1882), German-born French historical painter and portraitist
- Henri Matisse (1869–1954), French artist
- Henri Menier (1853–1913), French businessman and adventurer
- Henri Messerer (1838–1923), French organist and music composer
- Henri Moissan (1852–1907), the French winner of the Nobel Prize in Chemistry in 1906
- Henri Nouwen (1932–1996), Dutch Catholic priest, professor and writer
- Henri van Opstal (born 1989), Dutch kickboxer
- Henri Pélissier (1889–1935), French racing cyclist
- Henri Pescarolo (born 1942), French racing driver
- Henri Piispanen (born 1994), Finnish voice actor
- Henri Poincaré (1854–1912), French mathematician, theoretical physicist and philosopher of science
- Henri Rang (1902–1946), Romanian horse rider
- Henri Richard (1936–2020), Canadian professional ice hockey player
- Henri Ruitenberg (born 1957), Dutch speed skater
- Henri Saint Cyr (1902–1979), Swedish military officer and equestrian
- Henri Tasso (1882–1944), French politician
- Henri de Toulouse-Lautrec (1864–1901), French painter, printmaker, illustrator
- Henri Toivonen (1956–1986), Finnish rally driver
- Henri Toivomäki (born 1991), Finnish footballer
- Henri Treial (born 1992), Estonian volleyball player
- Henri Weber (1944–2020), French politician
- Henri D. Bonhomme (1747–1826), Dutch military officer and statesman
- Henri, cat in the web series Henri, le Chat Noir

== Fictional characters ==
- Henri, in the French romantic drama movie Love Is a Funny Thing
- Henri, a French pigeon in the 1986 film An American Tail
- Henri, le Chat Noir, an existential cat
- Henri, title character of Henri (2013 film)
- Henri Richard Maurice Dutoit LeFevbre, a French boy in the 2002 animated series Liberty's Kids

== See also ==
- Henry (given name), an equivalent English given name
- Hurricane Henri (disambiguation)
