= Hendrick =

Hendrick may refer to:

== People ==
- Hendrick (given name), alternative spelling of the Dutch given name Hendrik
- Hendrick (surname)
- King Hendrick (disambiguation), one of two Mohawk leaders who have often been conflated:
  - Hendrick Tejonihokarawa (1660–c.1735), one of the "Four Mohawk Kings"
  - Hendrick Theyanoguin (1692–1755), Mohawk leader associated with Sir William Johnson

== Other uses ==
- Hendrick Cottage, a building in Simsbury, Connecticut, United States
- Hendrick's Gin, Scottish gin brand
- Hendrick Health System, American healthcare provider
- Hendrick Island, large erosional feature in Bucks County, Pennsylvania, United States
- Hendrick Manufacturing Company, American perforated metal manufacturer
- Hendrick Motorsports, American stock car racing team

== See also ==
- Hendricks (disambiguation)
- Hendrich (disambiguation)
- Hendrik (disambiguation)
- Henrick
