= Henryk =

Henryk may refer to:

- Henryk (given name)
- Henryk, Świętokrzyskie Voivodeship, a village in south-central Poland
- Henryk Glacier, an Antarctic glacier

== See also ==
- Henryk Batuta hoax, an internet hoax
- Henrykian articles, a Polish constitutional law establishing elective monarchy
