= Hendrik =

Hendrik may refer to:

== People ==
- Hendrik (given name)
- Hans Hendrik (1832–1889), Greenlandic Arctic traveller and interpreter
- Tony Hendrik (born 1945), German music producer and composer

== Others ==
- Hendrik Island, an island in Greenland
- Hendrik-Ido-Ambacht, a municipality in the Netherlands

== See also ==
- Hendrich (disambiguation)
- Hendrick (disambiguation)
- Henrich
