= Henk =

- Gender: Male
- Language: Dutch

Origin
- Origin: Netherlands
- Meaning: Groom and Servant

Other names
- Related names: Hendrik; Henry

Henk is a Dutch male given name, originally a short form of Hendrik. It influenced "Hank" which is used in English-speaking countries (mainly in the US) as a form of "Henry".

== Academics ==
- Henk Aertsen (born 1943), Dutch Anglo-Saxon linguist
- Henk Barendregt (born 1947), Dutch logician
- Henk Jaap Beentje (born 1951), Dutch botanist
- Henk Blezer (born 1961), Dutch Tibetologist, Indologist, and scholar of Buddhist studies
- Henk Bodewitz (1939–2022), Dutch Sanskrit scholar
- Henk J. M. Bos (born 1940), Dutch historian of mathematics
- Henk Braakhuis (born 1939), Dutch historian of philosophy
- Henk Buck (1930–2023), Dutch organic chemist
- Henk van Dongen (1936–2011), Dutch organizational theorist and policy advisor
- Henk Dorgelo (1894–1961), Dutch physicist and academic
- Henk van der Flier (born 1945), Dutch psychologist
- Henk A. M. J. ten Have (born 1951), Dutch medical ethicist
- Henk van de Hulst (1918–2000), Dutch astronomer and mathematician
- Henk Lombaers (1920–2007), Dutch mathematician
- Henk Schulte Nordholt (1909–1998), Dutch professor of art and cultural history
- Henk Schulte Nordholt (born 1953), Dutch professor of Indonesian history
- Henk van Os (1938–2025), Dutch art historian
- Henk Overbeek (born 1949), Dutch international relations scholar and politician
- Henk G. Sol (born 1951), Dutch organizational theorist
- Henk Stoof (born 1962), Dutch theoretical physicist
- Henk Tennekes (1936–2021), Dutch meteorologist
- Henk Tennekes (toxicologist) (1950–2020), Dutch toxicologist
- Henk Tijms (born 1944), Dutch mathematician and operations researcher
- Henk Visser (pediatrician) (1930–2023), Dutch pediatrician
- Henk Volberda (born 1964), Dutch organizational theorist and management consultant
- Henk van der Vorst (born 1944), Dutch mathematician
- Henk Wesseling (1937–2018), Dutch historian
- Henk de Wit (1909–1999), Dutch systematic botanist
- Henk Zijm (born 1952), Dutch mathematician

== Arts and writing ==
- Henk Bos (1901–1979), Dutch painter
- Henk Bremmer (1871–1956), Dutch painter, art critic, art teacher, collector and art dealer
- Henk Chabot (1894–1949), Dutch painter
- Henk Guth (1921–2002), Dutch-Australian painter
- Henk Hofland (1927–2016), Dutch journalist, commentator, essayist and columnist
- Henk Jonker (1912–2002), Dutch photographer
- Henk Krol (born 1950), Dutch journalist, publisher, activist, and politician
- Henk Kuijpers (born 1946), Dutch comics artist
- Henk van der Meijden (born 1937), Dutch gossip journalist and theater producer
- Henk Peeters (1925–2013), Dutch modern art painter
- Henk Pierneef (1886–1957), South African landscape painter
- Henk Schiffmacher (born 1952), Dutch tattoo artist
- Henk van Sitteren (1904–1968), Dutch architect in Singapore and Malaysia
- Henk Stallinga (born 1962), Dutch visual artist
- Henk Trumpie (born 1937), Dutch ceramist and sculptor
- Henk van Ulsen (1927–2009), Dutch stage and television actor
- Henk Van der Kolk, Dutch-born Canadian film producer
- Henk van der Waal (born 1960), Dutch poet
- Henk van Woerden (1947–2005), Dutch painter and writer with close ties to South Africa

=== Music ===
- Henk Alkema (1944–2011), Dutch composer
- Henk Badings (1907–1987), Dutch composer
- Henk Bijvanck (1909–1969), Dutch composer
- Henk Bouman (born 1951), Dutch harpsichordist and baroque conductor
- Henk Hofstede (born 1951), Dutch pop musician, lead singer of the band "Nits"
- Henk Lauwers (born 1956), Belgian baritone singer
- Henk Leeuwis (1946–2022), Dutch pop singer
- Henk van Lijnschooten (1928–2006), Dutch wind orchestra composer
- Henk Pleket (1937–2011), Dutch pop singer
- Henk Poort (born 1956), Dutch musical actor and opera singer
- Henk de Vlieger (born 1953), Dutch percussionist, composer and arranger
- Henk van der Vliet (born 1928), Dutch flautist and classical composer
- Henk Westbroek (born 1952), Dutch radiohost, singer-songwriter, and political activist
- Henk Wijngaard (born 1946), Dutch country singer

== Politics and government ==
- Henk Beernink (1910–1979), Dutch politician
- Henk Bleker (born 1953), Dutch CDA politician
- Henk Chin A Sen (1934–1999), President of Suriname from 1980 to 1982
- Henk Feldmeijer (1910–1945), Dutch National Socialist politician and a member of the NSB
- Henk van Gerven (born 1955), Dutch politician and general practitioner
- Henk Gortzak (1908-1989), Dutch CPN & PSP politician
- Henk de Haan (born 1941), Dutch CDA politician and economist
- Henk Hoekstra (1924–2009), Dutch Communist politician
- Henk ten Hoeve (born 1946), Dutch politician
- Henk Hofstra (1904–1999), Dutch Labour Party politician
- Henk van Hoof (born 1947), Dutch VVD politician
- Henk Jumelet (born 1962), Dutch CDA politician
- Henk Kamp (born 1952), Dutch VVD politician
- Henk Koning (1933–2016), Dutch former tax official and politician
- Henk Korthals (1911–1976), Dutch Government Minister
- Henk Leenders (born 1955), Dutch Labour Party politician
- Henk Molleman (1935–2005), Dutch political scientist and Labour Party politician
- Henk Mudge (born 1952), Namibian Republican Party politician
- Henk Ngantung (1927–1991), Indonesian politician and First Vice Governor of Jakarta and Sixth Governor of Jakarta
- Henk Nijboer (born 1983), Dutch Labour Party politician
- Henk Nijhof (born 1952), Dutch politician and educator
- Henk Jan Ormel (born 1955), Dutch politician
- Henk van Rossum (1919–2017), Dutch politician
- Henk Visser (born 1946), Dutch politician
- Henk Vonhoff (1931–2010), Dutch VVD politician, state secretary, mayor and Queens commissioner
- Henk Vredeling (1924–2007), Dutch Labour Party politician and Minister of Defence
- Henk Zeevalking (1922–2005), Dutch Minister of Transport and Water Management
- Henk van der Zwan (born 1956), Dutch diplomat

== Sports ==
- Henk Angenent (born 1967), Dutch long-distance speed skater
- Henk Baars (born 1960), Dutch cyclo-cross cyclist
- Henk de Best (1905–1978), Dutch boxer
- Henk Boeve (born 1957), Dutch racing cyclist
- Henk Bouwman (1926–1995), Dutch field hockey player
- Henk Brouwer (born 1953), Dutch sprinter
- Henk Cornelisse (1940–2026), Dutch racing cyclist
- Henk van Essen (1909–1968), Dutch swimmer
- Henk Elzerman (born 1958), Dutch freestyle swimmer
- Henk Faanhof (1922–2015), Dutch road bicycle racer
- Henk Franken (born 1987), Namibian rugby player
- Henk van Gent (born 1951), Dutch competitive sailor
- Henk van der Grift (born 1935), Dutch speed skater
- Henk Groener (born 1960), Dutch handball coach and player
- Henk Grol (born 1985), Dutch judoka
- Henk-Jan Held (born 1967), Dutch volleyball player
- Henk Hermsen (1937–2022), Dutch water polo player
- Henk Hille (born 1959), Dutch ice hockey player
- Henk de Hoog (1918–1973), Dutch road racing cyclist
- Henk Janssen (1890–1969), Dutch tug of war competitor
- Henk Keemink (1902–1985), Dutch racewalker
- Henk Kersken (1880–1967), Dutch competitive sailor
- Henk van Kessel (born 1946), Dutch motorcycle road racer
- Henk Krediet (born 1942), Dutch modern pentathlete
- Henk de Looper (1912–2006), Dutch field hockey player
- Henk Lubberding (born 1953), Dutch road bicycle racer
- Henk Meijer (born 1959), Dutch taekwondo competitor and coach
- Henk Nieuwkamp (born 1942), Dutch racing cyclist
- Henk Nijdam (1935–2009), Dutch road bicycle racer
- Henk Norel (born 1987), Dutch basketball player
- Henk Numan (1955–2018), Dutch judoka
- Henk Ooms (1916–1993), Dutch cyclist
- Henk Poppe (born 1952), Dutch road bicycle racer
- Henk Rouwé (born 1946), Dutch rower
- Henk Schenk (born 1945), Dutch-born American Olympic wrestler
- Henk Schueler (1922–2016), Dutch speedskater
- Henk Starreveld (1914–2008), Dutch sprint canoeist
- Henk Temmink (born 1952), Dutch chess player
- Henk Visser (1932–2015), Dutch long jumper
- Henk Vogels (born 1973), Australian road bicycle racer
- Henk van der Wal (1886–1982), Dutch sprint and middle-distance runner
- Henk-Jan Zwolle (born 1964), Dutch Olympic rower

=== Football ===
- Henk Bloemers (1945–2015), Dutch footballer
- Henk Bos (born 1992), Dutch footballer
- Henk Bosveld (1941–1998), Dutch footballer
- Henk van Brussel (1936–2007), Dutch football player and manager
- Henk ten Cate (born 1954), Dutch football manager and player
- Henk Dijkhuizen (born 1992), Dutch football defender
- Henk Duut (born 1964), Dutch football defender
- Henk Fraser (born 1966), Surinamese-Dutch football manager and player
- Henk Grim (born 1962), Dutch football striker
- Henk Groot (1938–2022), Dutch football striker
- Henk van Heuckelum (1879–1929), Dutch-Belgian football forward
- Henk Hofs (1951–2011), Dutch footballer
- Henk Hordijk (1893–1975), Dutch footballer
- Henk Houwaart (born 1945), Dutch football manager and player
- Henk de Jong (born 1964), Dutch football manager
- Henk Muller (1887–1940), Dutch footballer
- Henk Nienhuis (1941–2017), Dutch football player and manager
- Henk Pellikaan (1910–1999), Dutch football midfielder
- Henk Plenter (1913–1997), Dutch football defender
- Henk Schouten (1932–2018), Dutch football midfielder
- Henk van Spaandonck (1913–1982), Dutch football forward
- Henk van Stee (born 1961), Dutch football midfielder
- Henk Steeman (1894–1979), Dutch footballer
- Henk Timmer (born 1971), Dutch football goalkeeper
- Henk Veerman (born 1991), Dutch football forward
- Henk Vos (born 1968), Dutch football striker and coach
- Henk Weerink (1936–2014), Dutch football referee
- Henk Wery (born 1943), Dutch football forward
- Henk Wisman (born 1957), Dutch football manager
- Henk Wullems (1936–2020), Dutch football manager

== Other ==
- Henk van den Breemen (born 1941), Dutch Marine Corps generals
- Henk Bruna (1916–2008), Dutch publisher and bookstore chain director
- Henk Heithuis (1935–1958), Dutch Catholic Church sexual abuse victim
- Henk van der Kroon (born 1942), Dutch founder and president of the Federation of European Carnival Cities
- Henk Muller (1859–1941), Dutch businessman, diplomat, explorer, publicist, and philanthropist
- Henk van Randwijk (1909–1966), Dutch resistance member, journalist, poet, and newspaper founder and editor
- Henk Rogers (born 1953), Dutch video game designer and entrepreneur
- Henk Savelberg (born 1953), Dutch chef
- Henk Sneevliet (1883–1942), Dutch Communist and World War II resistance member
  - Henk Sneevlietweg metro station, Amsterdam railway station named after him
- Henk Terlingen (1941–1994), Dutch radio and television presenter
- Henk de Velde (1949–2022), Dutch seafarer and solo circumnavigating sailor
- Henk Visser (1923–2006)), Dutch arms and armory collector
- Henk Zanoli (1923–2015), Dutch lawyer and World War II resistance member
- Henk Zwartepoorte (1949–2016), Dutch herpetologist

== Fictional characters ==
- Cowboy Henk, Belgian surreal humour comic strip series
- Henk and Ingrid, fictitious Dutch couple often mentioned in speeches by Geert Wilders as the people he claims to represent
- Ome Henk ("Uncle Henk"), the main character of a Dutch CD, DVD and comic series of the same name

== As a surname ==
- Dan Henk (born 1972), American artist and writer, noted for his work in tattooing and painting
- Ludwig von Henk (1820–1894), German naval officer

== See also ==
- Hendric
- Hendrick (disambiguation)
- Hendricks (disambiguation)
- Hendrickx
- Hendrik (disambiguation)
- Hendriks
- Hendrikx
- Hendrix (disambiguation)
- Hendryx
- Henrik
- Henry (disambiguation)
- Henryk (given name)
