= Nordholt =

Nordholt is a surname. Notable people with the surname include:

- Beth Nordholt, American physicist
- Henk Schulte Nordholt (born 1953), Dutch historian of Indonesia
- Henk Schulte Nordholt (1909–1998), Dutch historian of art
