= Henk Visser =

Henk Visser is the name of:

- Henk Visser (collector) (1923–2006), arms and armory collector from the Netherlands
- Henk Visser (long jumper) (1932–2015), Olympic long jumper from the Netherlands
- Henk Visser (pediatrician) (born 1930), pediatrician from the Netherlands
- Henk Visser (politician) (born 1946), politician from the Netherlands
