= Project Space on the Inside =

Building in Amsterdam, The Netherlands

project space On The Inside
- Interactive map of the project space On The Inside area

General information
- Location: Amsterdam, Netherlands, tt. Melaniaweg 1, 1033ST, The Netherlands
- Coordinates: 52.40394°N 4.89331°E
- Opened: June 6, 2020; 5 years ago

Design and construction
- Known for: Art exhibition space

Website
- https://www.projectspaceontheinside.org/

Project Space on the Inside (hereinafter referred to as On the Inside) is an Amsterdam-based contemporary art space located in NDSM-Wharf, Amsterdam Noord. It is an independent and international platform, founded by Annemarie Galani and artist Henk Stallinga. The space is considered an alternative exhibition space and a non-profit organization. On The Inside aims to "program artists at every stage of their careers, enabling them to make and show work that is relevant for today; brave, challenging, engaging, and vital."

Notable artists who have been featured on On the Inside include Cyprien Gaillard, Rose Wylie, William Kentridge, Bill Viola, Katherine Bradford, Melanie Bonajo, David Claerbout, Aernout Mik and Amalia Pica. Currently, On The Inside is hosting an exhibition titled Zwerk—a reflection on the poetic Dutch word for "sky." Curated by Annemarie Galani, Zwerk brings together thirteen international artists working across film, painting, and photography. The exhibition features film works by Yael Bartana, Wangechi Mutu, and Nicolas Provost; photography by Wolfgang Tillmans, Thomas Ruff, and Natalie Czech; and paintings by Bhasha Chakrabarti, Matthew Day Jackson, Jānis Avotiņš, Lieven Hendriks, Salvo and Dana Powell. A new site-specific installation by Henk Stallinga anchors the exhibition.

== Exhibitions ==
Name of the Exhibition	Opening Date	End date
hallucinogenic	June 6, 2020	August 8, 2020
in search of the miraculous: sgabello collection	September 7, 2020	November 29, 2020
fragments of sphere	February 15, 2021	August 1, 2021
are you comfortable?	March 27, 2022	August 21, 2022
oscar	November 11, 2022	November 12, 2022
juxtaposed: aaron van erp/steven aalders	March 26, 2023	June 4, 2023
the artist is a beast	June 18, 2023	September 10, 2023
off the timeline	July 16, 2024	October 13, 2024
lines, lives and lies	July 16, 2024	October 13, 2024
zwerk	July 19, 2025	October 31, 2025

== Publications ==
On The Inside has been reported several times in national Dutch newspapers such as NRC, Het Parool, de Volkskrant, and Metropolis M (see Publication).

- David Claerbout in Fragments of Sphere
- (in Dutch) Een paar keer wiebelen met haar kwast en Caroline Walker heeft het voor elkaar
- (in Dutch) Tentoonstelling Fragments of Sphere: heel even is de wereld één
- (in Dutch) Wanneer het ongemakkelijk wordt – groepstentoonstelling ‘Are You Comfortable?’ bij On The Inside
- (in Dutch) Kunstverzamelaar Edwin Oostmeijer: ‘Ik heb als een beest verzameld’
- (in Dutch) Auteursrecht- en databankenrecht voorbehoud
