= Herman Meijer =

Dutch politician

Personal details
- Born: 15 February 1947 (age 79)
- Party: GroenLinks
- Education: Delft University of Technology
- Awards: Knight of the Order of Orange-Nassau

Herman Meijer (born 15 February 1947 in Eindhoven) is a Dutch politician for the GroenLinks party.

== Life ==
Meijer studied architecture and urban planning at Delft University of Technology. He was active in the gay and lesbian movement and the peace movement, and became a member of the Communist Party of the Netherlands. In 1990, Meijer joined the GroenLinks party. From 1990 to 2002, he sat on the city council of Rotterdam. From 1994 to 2002, Meijer served as alderman in that city. From 2003 to 2006, Meijer succeeded Mirjam de Rijk as party leader of GroenLinks. He was succeeded as party leader by Henk Nijhof in 2006.

== Awards ==
- 2002: Knight of the Order of Orange-Nassau
- Wolfert van Borselenpenning from the city of Rotterdam
