= Temmink =

Temmink is a surname of Dutch origin.

== List of people with the surname ==
- Henk Temmink (born 1952), Dutch chess player
- Nicole Temmink (born 1987), Dutch politician
- René Temmink (born 1960), Dutch football referee

== See also ==
- Temmink: The Ultimate Fight
- Coenraad Jacob Temminck
