= Euroseas =

Euroseas may refer to:

- Euroseas (company), a shipping company
- European Association for Southeast Asian Studies, a learned society in Southeast Asian studies
