= Ian G. Baird =

Canadian geographer and professor

- Born: Victoria, British Columbia, Canada
- Education: University of Victoria (B.A., M.A.); University of British Columbia (Ph.D.)
- Known for: Research on Mekong River hydropower impacts, inland fisheries co-management, large-scale land concessions, and ethnic minorities (especially the Brao people) in Laos, Thailand, and northeastern Cambodia
- Scientific career
- Fields: Political ecology, historical geography, Southeast Asian studies
- Workplaces: University of Wisconsin-Madison
- Thesis: Various forms of colonialism: The social and spatial reorganisation of the Brao in southern Laos and northeastern Cambodia (2008)

Ian G. Baird is a Canadian geographer and professor in the Department of Geography at the University of Wisconsin-Madison. His research employs political ecology frameworks to examine the social and ecological impacts of large hydropower dams on Mekong River fisheries and livelihoods, large-scale land concessions, indigenous identities and rights, and the modern histories of upland ethnic minorities (particularly the Brao people) in Laos, Thailand, and northeastern Cambodia.

== Early life and education ==
Baird is originally from Victoria, British Columbia, Canada. He earned a B.A. (with distinction) in Geography (Co-operative Education program) with a minor in Environmental Studies and an M.A. (with distinction) in Geography, both from the University of Victoria. He completed a Ph.D. in geography at the University of British Columbia in 2008; his dissertation examined "Various forms of colonialism: The social and spatial reorganisation of the Brao in southern Laos and northeastern Cambodia."

== Pre-academic career ==
Before entering academia, Baird worked with non-governmental organizations in Thailand and Laos. In 1991–1992 he served as the first dolphin-safe tuna monitor for the Earth Island Institute in Bangkok, as part of the international dolphin-safe labeling campaign.

In January 1993 he founded the Lao Community Fisheries and Dolphin Protection Project in Khong District, Champasak Province, southern Laos. He lived in Hang Khone Village until 1999 and led community-based aquatic resource co-management initiatives. The project helped establish Fish Conservation Zones across multiple villages, drawing on local ecological knowledge; villagers reported increased fish stocks.

== Academic career ==
Baird joined the faculty of the University of Wisconsin-Madison in fall 2010 as a tenure-track assistant professor. He is now a full professor and is affiliated with the Center for Southeast Asian Studies and the Nelson Institute for Environmental Studies. He coordinates the Hmong Studies Consortium at UW-Madison and has served as co-editor-in-chief (with Matthew W. King and Debojyoti Das) of the Taylor & Francis journal Asian Ethnicity since February 2021.

== Research and scholarship ==
Baird's scholarship focuses on human-environment relations in the Mekong River Basin. Major themes include the downstream impacts of large hydropower dams on fisheries and livelihoods, large-scale land acquisitions and tenure issues, indigeneity, borders, and 19th–20th century histories of marginalized upland peoples.

His 2020 monograph Rise of the Brao: Ethnic Minorities in Northeastern Cambodia during Vietnamese Occupation (University of Wisconsin Press) was a 2nd runner-up for the EuroSEAS Humanities Book Prize and has received reviews in several peer-reviewed academic journals, including The Journal of Asian Studies, Journal of Vietnamese Studies, and Moussons.

== Selected publications ==
- Baird, Ian G. (2025). Champassak Royalty and Sovereignty: Within and between Nation-States in Mainland Southeast Asia. University of Wisconsin Press.
- Baird, Ian G. (2024). Thailand’s Volunteer Hill Tribe Militia (1970–1983): An Under-Recognized Anti-Communist Force. White Lotus Books.
- Baird, Ian G. (2020). Rise of the Brao: Ethnic Minorities in Northeastern Cambodia during Vietnamese Occupation. University of Wisconsin Press. ISBN 978-0299326104.
- Baird, Ian G. & Quastel, Noah (2011). "Dolphin-Safe Tuna from California to Thailand: Localisms in Environmental Certification of Global Commodity Networks". Annals of the Association of American Geographers, 101(2): 337–355.
- Baird, Ian G. & Flaherty, Mark S. (2005). "Mekong River fish conservation zones in southern Laos: Assessing effectiveness using local ecological knowledge". Environmental Management, 36(3): 439–454.

== Awards and recognition ==
- 2nd runner-up, EuroSEAS Humanities Book Prize (2022) for Rise of the Brao
