= Circustheater =

Musical theatre in The Hague, Netherlands

AFAS Circustheater
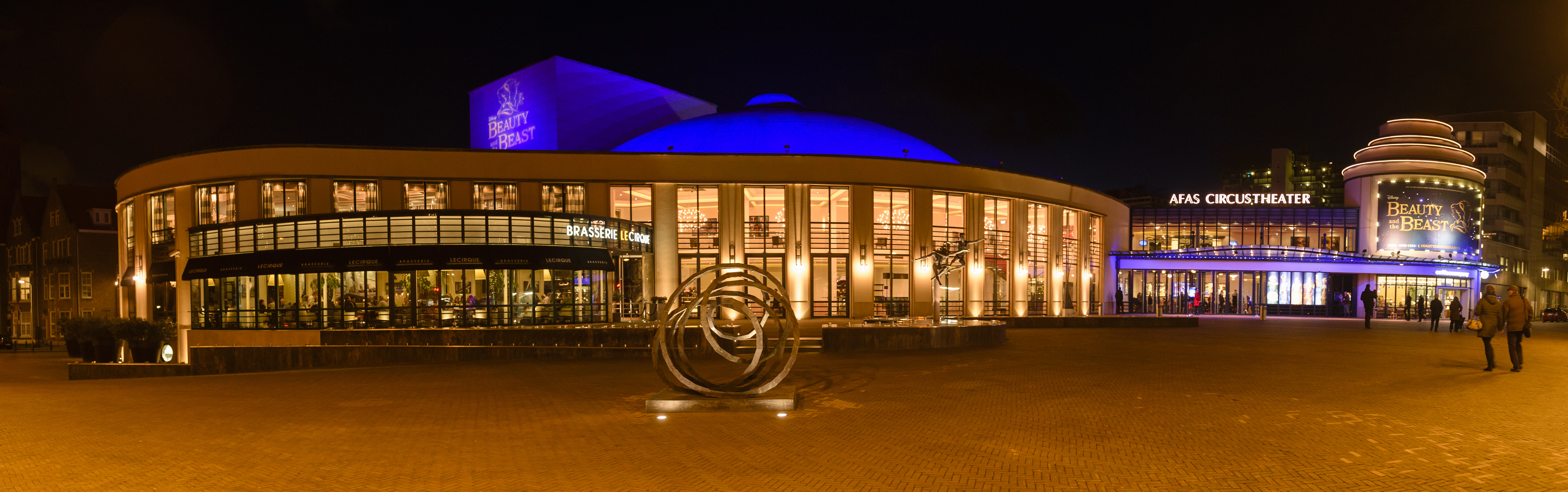
- AFAS Circustheater in 2016
- Interactive map of AFAS Circustheater
- Former names: Circustheater (1904–1991, 2010–2011); VSB Circustheater (1991–2004); Fortis Circustheater (2004–2010)
- Address: Circusstraat 4, 2586 CW; The Hague; Netherlands
- Coordinates: 52.110833°N 4.2825°E
- Owner: Stage Entertainment
- Capacity: 1852
- Production: Harry Potter and the Cursed Child (2026–)

Construction
- Opened: 16 July 1904
- Renovated: 1993
- Architects: Wilhelmus Bernardus van Liefland; Arno Meijs

Website
- AFAS Circustheater

The AFAS Circustheater is a musical theatre in The Hague, owned and operated by Stage Entertainment.

== History ==
The theatre dates back to 1904, when it was designed by Wilhelmus Barnardus van Liefland and was built to house Circus Schumann during the summer season. When the publics interest in the circus declined, the theatre was transformed in 1964 to a regular theater to house concerts among others. Over the following decades the theatre started to deteriorate. Joop van den Ende, Stardust B.V. and Xelat Recrea B.V. acquired the theatre from the municipality of The Hague for the symbolic amount of ƒ 1,-. The consortium invested ƒ 25 million and transformed the site into the first open-end musical theatre of The Netherlands, the new theatre was designed by architect Meijs. The theatre is currently owned and operated by Stage Entertainment, the international live-entertainment company founded by Joop van den Ende.

== Sponsorship ==
The theatre has had a sponsor since the re-opening in 1991. This started with VSB from 1991 till 2004, when VSB merged with Fortis changing the name into Fortis Circustheater. When the bank failed during the 2008 financial crisis the sponsorship stopped in 2010. In 2011 a new sponsor was found in AFAS, resulting in the current name of the complex.

== Productions ==
Show	Start	End	Notes
Les Misérables	6 December 1991	24 May 1992	Opened originally on 28 February 1991 at Carré Theatre.
The Phantom of the Opera	15 August 1993	3 August 1996	
Miss Saigon	24 November 1996	4 July 1999	
Elisabeth	21 November 1999	22 July 2001	
Aida	21 October 2001	3 August 2003	
The Sound of Music	9 September 2003	9 January 2004	Continuation of the original tour premiering on 23 September 2002 at Carré Theatre.
The Lion King	4 April 2004	27 August 2006	
Beauty and the Beast	September 2006	13 January 2007	Continuation of the original tour premiering on 2 October 2005 at Carré Theatre.
Tarzan	15 April 2007	24 May 2009	European premiere.
Ciske de Rat	25 June 2009	29 November 2009	Continuation of the original tour premiering on 7 October 2005 at Carré Theatre.
Mary Poppins	11 April 2010	28 August 2011	
Wicked	6 November 2011	11 January 2013	
Sister Act	3 March 2013	10 August 2014	
Billy Elliot	30 November 2014	7 November 2015	
Beauty and the Beast	13 December 2015	4 September 2016	Revival production.
The Lion King	30 October 2016	21 July 2019	Revival production.
Anastasia	5 September 2019	22 March 2020 || The production has been put on hold, due to the COVID-19 pandemic.	
The Sound of Music	June 2021	September 2021	Start of a national tour.
Aladdin	18 September 2021 ||26 February 2023 || The production was set to premiere in autumn 2020 but was delayed due to the COVID-19 pandemic.		
Aida	12 April 2023	14 April 2024	Revival production.
Frozen	31 May 2024	4 January 2026	Previews until 8 June 2024; Premiere 9 June 2024; Performances (Wed-Sun) from 12 June 2024.
Harry Potter and the Cursed Child	3 March 2026	TBD	Previews until 13 March 2026; Premiere 14 March 2026; Performances (Wed-Sun) from 18 March 2026.

== Trivia ==
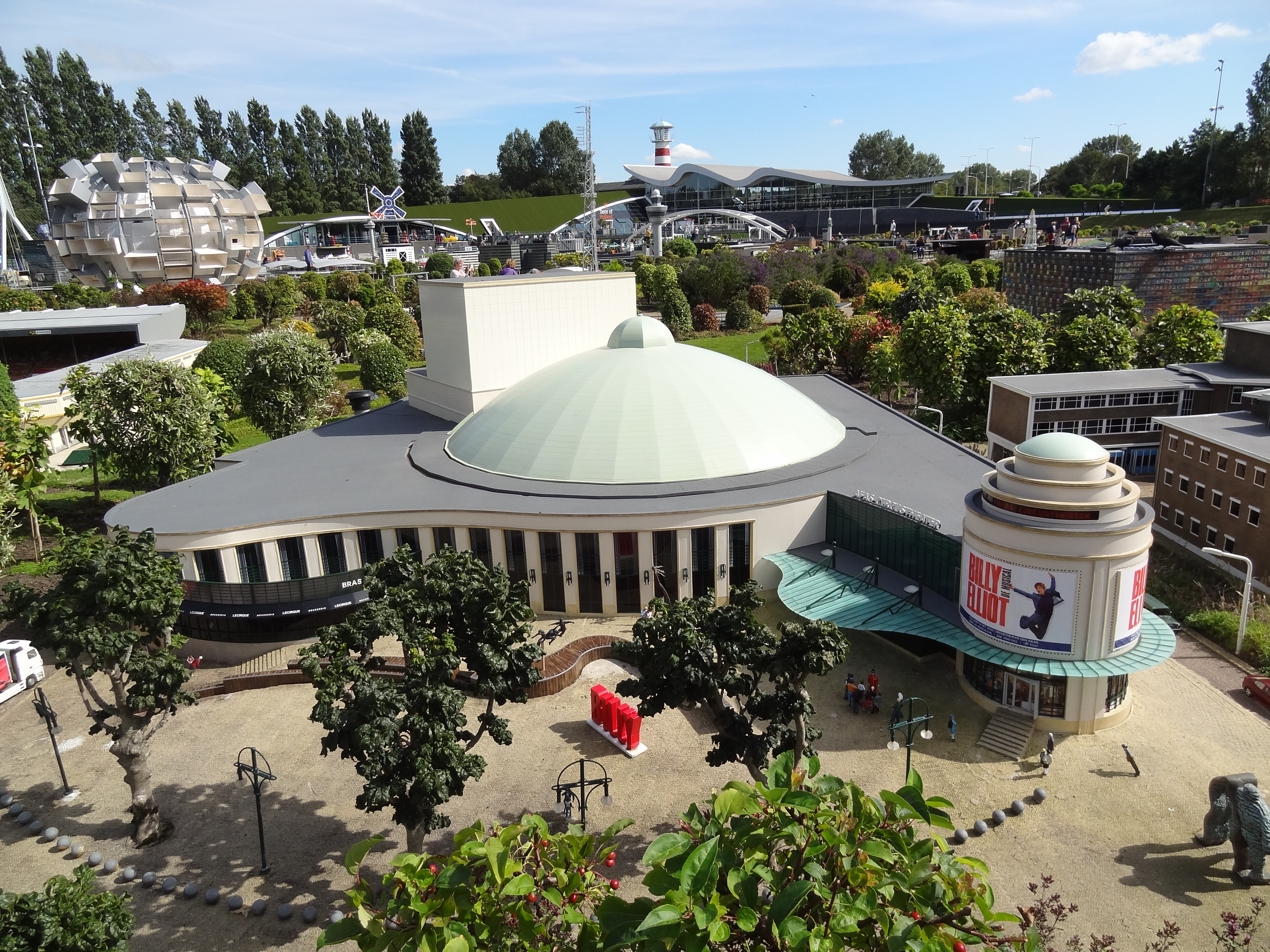
Replica in Madurodam

- In honour of its 100-year anniversary, Madurodam unveiled a replica of the building on 5 October 2004.
