= Henk Blezer =

Dutch Tibetologist

H.W.A. (Henk) Blezer
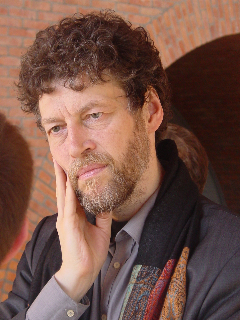
- Blezer at the conference Between Empire and Phyi dar: the Fragmentation and Reconstruction of Society and Religion in Post-imperial Tibet, in Lumbini, Nepal, March 1–4, 2011
- Born: July 14, 1961; Schaesberg
- Scientific career
- Fields: Tibetology; Indology; Buddhist studies Bön
- Workplaces: Leiden

H.W.A. (Henk) Blezer (born July 14, 1961 in Schaesberg) is a Dutch Tibetologist, Indologist, and scholar of Buddhist studies.

== Study ==
After initial studies in Biology and Biochemistry, and also in Theology, from 1987, Blezer studied Indology at Leiden University. In 1992, he completed his 'Doctoraal' (B.A. + M.A.) in Buddhist, Tibetan, and Vedic Studies (cum laude).

From 1993, he did Ph.D. research at the Center for Non-Western Studies (CNWS, later: Research School for Asian, African, and Amerindian Studies). He defended his Ph.D. thesis on April 16, 1997. His dissertation is on post-mortem visions of peaceful and wrathful deities, discussed according to esoteric traditions attributed the 14th century visionary saint Karma Lingpa.

== Career ==
Since 1997, Blezer works as postdoctoral researcher at Leiden University. His research covers Tibetan and also Indian history of ideas, notably Buddhism, Tibetan Buddhism, and Bön. He completed three postdoc research projects in this field.

In 2000, Blezer organized the ninth seminar of the IATS (International Association for Tibetan Studies), at the IIAS (International Institute for Asian Studies), in Leiden, with ca. 300 participants and 215 papers. In 2002 he published the proceedings of the Leiden seminar, in ten volumes, with Brill Academic Publishers.

From 2005 to 2010, as principal investigator, Blezer led a Vidi research programme on a Tibetan minority Religion called Bön: The Three Pillars of Bön: Doctrine, 'Location' and Founder. The research programme was jointly funded by the Nederlandse Organisatie voor Wetenschappelijk Onderzoek (NWO) and Leiden University. The programme has as short public summary:

Adherents of the Tibetan Bön religion (Bönpos) style their religion Eternal Bön for a reason: they have outspoken ideas about the antiquity of their origins. In their view Bön traditions preserve and continue religious culture that predates the first official introduction of Buddhism into Tibetan cultural areas (7th to 9th c. AD); Bönpos consider themselves to be (more) indigenous to Tibet. Nowadays, they trace their origins even as far back as 16.017 BC (in the Paleolithic!). Tibetan Buddhism is thus portrayed as a relatively new arrival on the scene, a foreign tradition at best. There is an interesting paradox involved in this Bön historical endeavor. It resides precisely in the need felt by Bönpos to establish vis-à-vis Tibetan Buddhists the continuity of Bön from a period that, in fact, antedates the appearance of organized Bön and its written sources in Tibet. Due to the understandable scarcity of early (and relevant) written Tibetan and particularly Bön sources, these indigenous antecedents of Bön largely elude (textual) historical verification. The aim of the project is to understand the process of formation of Bön religious identity in Tibet at the turn of the first millennium AD; this process is defined by the presence in the area of rather successfully competing Buddhist sects, at a time when these sects were arising and Tibetan Buddhism was undergoing a major renaissance.

Around 2010, Blezer prepares two monographs and one volume of conference proceedings on the origins of the Bön minority religion in Tibet. He also edits two volumes with comparative case studies on the wider topic of the emergence of new religious traditions, particularly in subdominant positions. The volumes broadly engage culture comparison and include contributions from an international group of specialists on different regions of the Far and Middle East. One of these volumes draws special attention to the ubiquitous phenomenon of nativist responses to the rise of Buddhism; this volume he edits together with Mark Teeuwen (University of Oslo).

Blezer is co-founder and editor of Brill's Tibetan Studies Library.

== Affiliation ==
From 1993 to 1997 Blezer was affiliated to the Center for Non-Western Studies (CNWS) at Leiden University; from 1997 to 2001 to the IIAS (International institute for Asian Studies) in Leiden; and from 2002 to 2008 again to the CNWS. Since 2008 he works for the LIAS (het Leiden University Institute for Area Studies), where since 2010 he teaches Buddhist studies.

== Bibliography ==
=== Books ===
- Blezer, Henk (1997) Kar gling Zhi khro: A Tantric Buddhist Concept, Research School CNWS, School of Asian, African, and Amerindian Studies, Vol.56, ISBN 90-73782-85-6
- Blezer, Henk (2002) Tibetan Studies: Proceedings of the International Association for Tibetan Studies (PIATS), editor of three volumes of general proceedings, Tibetan Studies I, II & III, and general editor of seven volumes of panel proceedings of the IATS:

1. Tibet, Past and Present, Proceedings of the Ninth Seminar of the IATS, 2000, Volume 1, by H. Blezer, with the co-operation of A. Zadoks, Brill Academic Publishers, Leiden, ISBN 978-90-04-12775-3
2. Religion and Secular Culture in Tibet, Proceedings of the Ninth Seminar of the IATS, 2000, Volume 2, by H. Blezer, with the co-operation of A. Zadoks, Brill Academic Publishers, Leiden, ISBN 978-90-04-15482-7
3. Impressions of Bhutan and Tibetan Art, Proceedings of the Ninth Seminar of the IATS, 2000, Volume 3, by J. Ardussi and H. Blezer, with the co-operation of A. Zadoks, Brill Academic Publishers, Leiden, ISBN 978-90-04-12545-2
4. Khams pa Histories: Visions of People, Place and Authority, Proceedings of the Ninth Seminar of the IATS, 2000, Volume 4, by L. Epstein, Brill Academic Publishers, Leiden, ISBN 978-90-04-12423-3
5. Amdo Tibetans in Transition, Proceedings of the Ninth Seminar of the IATS, 2000, Volume 5, by T. Huber, Brill Academic Publishers, Leiden, ISBN 978-90-04-12596-4
6. Medieval Tibeto-Burman Languages, Proceedings of the Ninth Seminar of the IATS, 2000, Volume 6, by C.I. Beckwith, Brill Academic Publishers, Leiden, ISBN 978-90-04-12424-0
7. Buddhist Art and Tibetan Patronage Ninth to Fourteenth Centuries, Proceedings of the Ninth Seminar of the IATS, 2000, Volume 7, by D. Klimburg-Salter and E. Allinger, Brill Academic Publishers, Leiden, ISBN 978-90-04-12600-8
8. Tibet, Self, and the Tibetan Diaspora, Proceedings of the Ninth Seminar of the IATS, 2000, Volume 8, by P.C. KLieger, Brill Academic Publishers, Leiden, ISBN 978-90-04-12555-1
9. Territory and Identity in Tibet and the Himalayas, Proceedings of the Ninth Seminar of the IATS, 2000, Volume 9, by K. Buffetrille and H. Diemberger, Brill Academic Publishers, Leiden, ISBN 978-90-04-12597-1
10. The Many Canons of Tibetan Buddhism, Proceedings of the Ninth Seminar of the IATS, 2000, Volume 10, by H. Eimer and D. Germano, Brill Academic Publishers, Leiden, ISBN 978-90-04-12595-7

=== Scientific articles (selection) ===
- Blezer, Henk (2003) "Karma Gling pa: Treasure Finder (gTer sTon), Creative Editor (gTer sTon?)", in East and West, vol.52, nos.1–4 (December 2002), pp. 311–45, IsIAO: Rome, ISSN 0012-8376
- Blezer, Henk (2007) "Heaven my Blanket, Earth my Pillow: Wherever Rin po che Lays his Head down to Rest is the Original Place of Bon", in Acta Orientalia, Vol.68 (2007), pp. 75–112, Hermes: Oslo, ISSN 0001-6446
- Blezer, Henk (2008) "sTon pa gShen rab: Six Marriages and Many More Funerals", in Revue d'Études Tibétaines (RET), Vol.15 (November 2008), pp. 421–79, Paris.
- Blezer, Henk (2009) "The Silver Castle Revisited: A Few Notes", in Acta Orientalia, Vol.70 (2009), pp. 217–23 (addition to Blezer 2007), Novus: Oslo, ISSN 0001-6438
