= Henk Schulte Nordholt =

Dutch historian (born 1953)

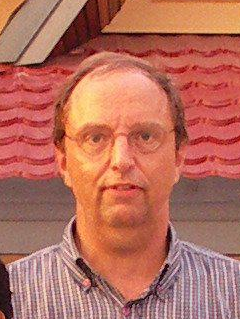
- Nordholt in 2005
- Born: 13 June 1953 (age 73); De Bilt, Netherlands
- Education: Vrije Universiteit Amsterdam

H.G.C. "Henk" Schulte Nordholt (born 13 June 1953, in De Bilt) is former head of research at KITLV and emeritus KITLV professor of Indonesian History at Leiden University. His focus is on Southeast Asian history, contemporary politics in Indonesia, political violence, Balinese studies and the anthropology of colonialism. He was chairman of the board of the International Institute of Asian Studies (IIAS) and Secretary of the European Association for Southeast Asian Studies (EuroSEAS).

Nordholt graduated with a degree in history from the VU University in Amsterdam in 1980. He earned his PhD in social sciences from the Free University in 1988 with a thesis on the history of the political system on the island of Bali. He taught anthropology and Asian history at the University of Amsterdam from 1985 until 2005. From 1999 till 2011 he IIAS professor of Asian History at the Erasmus University in Rotterdam and professor of Southeast Asian Studies at the Vrije Universiteit in Amsterdam .

Schulte Nordholt coordinared the research program "Governance, Markets and Citizens (2013–2017)", sponsored by the Scientific Program Indonesia – Netherlands (SPIN) and was involved in the "Dutch Military Operations in Indonesia, 1945–1950" program.
