= Susan Hendrik van Sitteren =

Dutch architect

Susan Hendrik 'Henk' van Sitteren
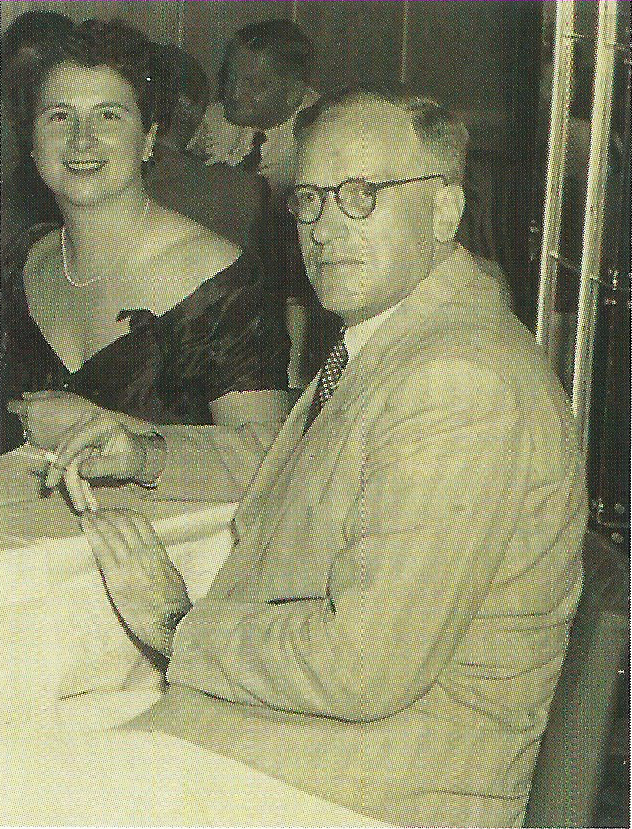
- Van Sitteren with Corry Iversen in 1952. Photo from Ruth Iversen Rollitt's book, 'Iversen'
- Born: Susan Hendrik van Sitteren; 4 November 1904; Amsterdam, Netherlands
- Died: 13 September 1968 (aged 63); On board a ship from Portugal to South Africa
- Occupation: Architect

Susan Hendrik 'Henk' van Sitteren (1904–1968) was a Dutch architect in Singapore and Malaysia. His career began when he came to Singapore and landed a position in Keys & Dowdeswell, then a major international architecture firm. It was during this time that Van Sitteren met his future partner, architect Berthel Michael Iversen. The two would later establish Iversen & Van Sitteren Partners - with branches in Ipoh, Penang, Kuala Lumpur & Singapore. The firm was one of the most important in Southeast Asia for establishing a foothold for international style modernism.

== Early life ==
Van Sitteren was born on 4 November 1904 in the city of Amsterdam, Netherlands. He was named after his aunt, Susan.

== In Singapore ==
In 1929, Van Sitteren arrived in Singapore and joined Keys & Dowdeswell after being trained in Netherlands. Singapore was a cosmopolitan city that attracted many young expatriates who were employed in larger international firms. It was during his time in Keys & Dowdeswell that Van Sitteren met B.M Iversen through a mutual friend, Karl Gustav Lommer whom Iversen considered a ‘good friend’.

Having been trained in the Netherlands, Van Sitteren was likely familiar with the ‘Amsterdam School’ - a modernist architectural movement that bloomed in the 1920s. Backed by housing authorities in Amsterdam, young architects sought innovative solutions to housing and municipal commissions. Despite the individualistic approach, a recognisable identity managed to emerge in their architectonic design of entire neighbourhoods.

Van Sitteren and Iversen's friendship was likely sparked by the latter's growing interest with architectural styles - namely ‘Amsterdam School’. With their newfound friendship, Iversen had the opportunity to learn about it first-hand. They shared a flat in River Valley Road, Singapore and the two would have shared a cosy dinner once a month whenever Van Sitteren was around.

== Japanese Internment Camp ==
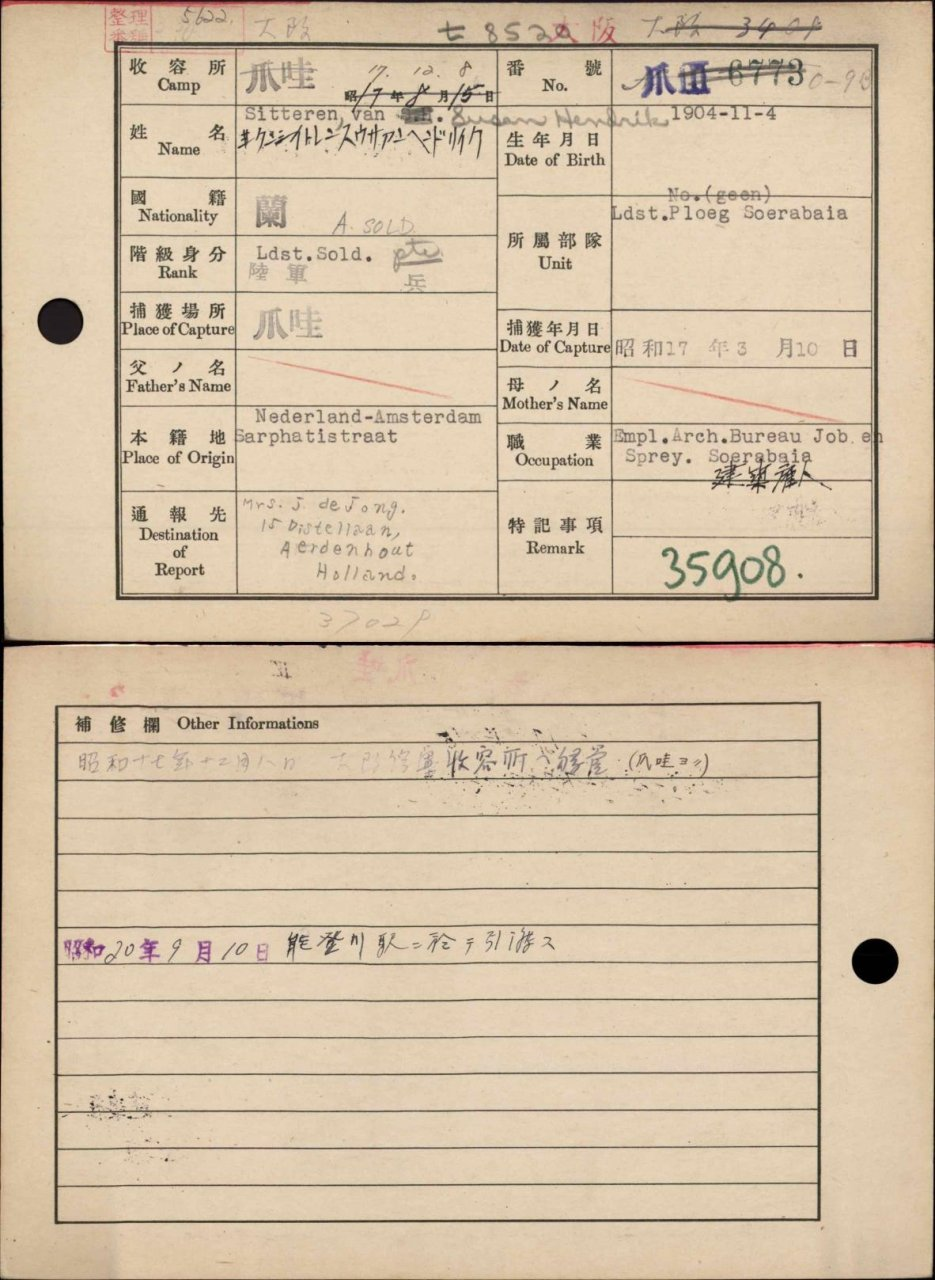
Van Sitteren's Prison Internment Card containing details of his capture in Kanji writing

During the period of World War II, Van Sitteren did some chicken farming before he was enlisted to Java (an island in Indonesia) in 1945 to defend his country. However, he was taken prisoner by the Japanese was practiced as a tailor in prison camp in Japan.

In 1947, B.M Iversen found Van Sitteren in Holland in a semi-paralysed condition wearing borrowed clothes. He then brought Van Sitteren to Ipoh.

== Partnership & Works in Singapore ==
=== Iversen and Van Sitteren ===
In 1950, B.M Iversen made Van Sitteren a partner and the firm became Iversen and Van Sitteren. They maintained a permanent office in Kuala Lumpur, moving into the 5th floor of the Loke Yew building the moment it was completed. Iversen headed back to Ipoh and their Penang offices which he led, while Van Sitteren headed the Kuala Lumpur office as well as the temporary Singapore office.

Van Sitteren would make regular trips to Ipoh to consult with Iversen, while the latter would travel to Kuala Lumpur and Singapore for meetings. The two old friends worked closely together, staying true to their philosophy of architecture and friendship.

=== S.H. van Sitteren, Singapore ===
Van Sitteren started to undertake more work in Singapore, practicing under the name S.H. van Sitteren, Architect, and submitting plans in Singapore from 1951 to 1959. It is likely that Iversen provided the capital and was the controlling partner, but for registration purposes the Singapore firm was in Van Sitteren's name.

The firm initially had a temporary office on the fifth floor of MacDonald House, Singapore, before moving to 60 Orchard Road in 1952. That year, Van Sitteren also built his own house at Coronation Road. The firm's good relationship with Dutch and Danish companies guaranteed them a steady stream of clients in Singapore. Meanwhile, many of Van Sitteren's works were for the firm's European clients, J.H. Vavasseur & Co., Diethelm & Co. and the East Asiatic Co. Ltd, building houses for them on Thomson Road in 1953. He also continued to work for the Lokes – Mrs C.K. Loke, Loke Wan Tho and his brother Loke Wan Yat – as well as their rivals Run Run Shaw and Runme Shaw.

=== Prominent works ===
One of the largest projects which the firm took on were the flats for the Rotterdam Trading Company (Koninklijke Paketvaart-Maatschappij or KPM), called KPM Flats 100 at Dunearn Road, which commenced in 1951 and continued for a number of years. Over the years, Van Sitteren did some work for the Dutch Club, designed a block of four flats at Holland Road for Netherland Line Royal Dutch Mail (1953) and its extension (1958), KPM Flats at Dunearn Court (1953) and at Mount Elizabeth (1955), flats at Orange Grove Road/Fernhill Road for the Hollandsche School (1955), and godowns at Martin Road for the Netherlands Trading Society.

Iversen and Van Sitteren enjoyed a good working relationship with the contractors they worked with. One of them was Lim Kah Ngam, the contractor who successfully tendered for the Federal House project. Hailing from Batu Pahat, Johor, Lim established himself as a major contractor in Singapore. Lim Kah Ngam undertook the construction of the Macpherson Road Market designed by Van Sitteren, which would accommodate 700 stalls, with special refrigeration rooms on the lower floor, a restaurant on the upper floor, and ample car park. The $250,000 market opened in January 1956.

Another project designed by Van Sitteren and constructed by Lim Kah Ngam was Denmark House, Singapore for the Asiatic Company and other co-owners. The foundation stone was laid by Prince Axel of Denmark. With a floor space of 75,000 square feet, this ten storey block of offices would house the City Bank, the East Asiatic Company, the Singapore Chamber of Commerce and other offices. It was completed at the end of 1957, as The Straits Times reported that year.

In 1958, Van Sitteren designed a ‘big block of flats for the colony’. Their client was a housing development concern, Nanyang Investment Co. The five-storey block, occupying a 53,000 square-food site at Oxley Rise behind Orchard Road, would cost $2 million. In order to ensure maximum protection against noise, the flats would be constructed with hollow block floors and cavity walls. The 84 units were offered for $22,500 each.

== Retirement ==
Van Sitteren retired in 1959. He resided in Durban, South Africa after leaving Malaysia. For the next three years, the Singapore firm was known as Van Sitteren & Partners, with an address on the fourth floor of the KPM Building, Singapore. James Gordon Dowsett, an Australian architectural assistant who had formerly worked with Palmer & Turner (Hong Kong), joined the Singapore office. He designed his own residence at Holland Road in 1958.

== Death ==
On 13 September 1968, Van Sitteren died on board a ship from Portugal to South Africa. He was returning from a short holiday.

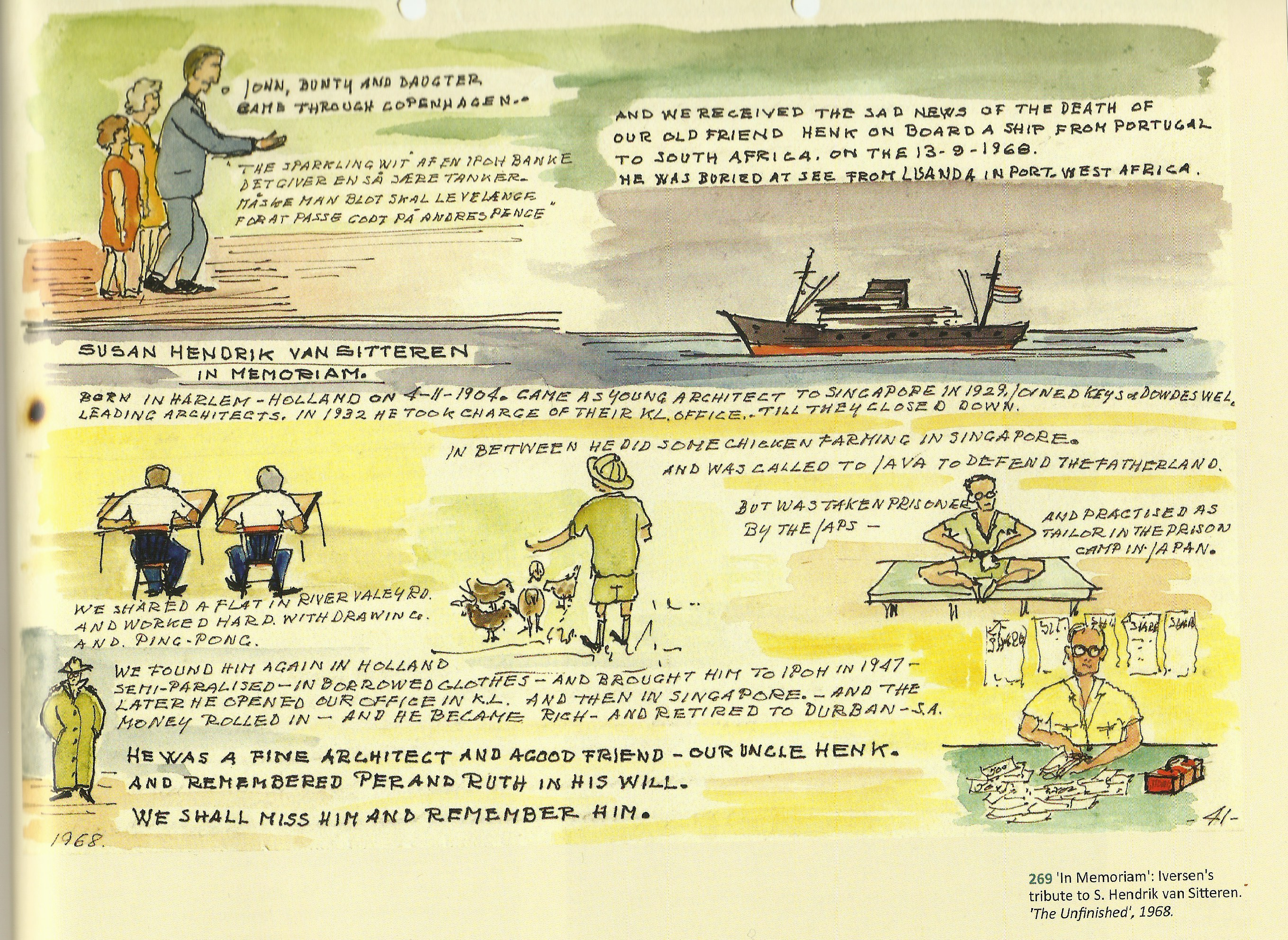
B.M Iversen's hand sketched tribute to Hendrik van Sitteren - as part of his 'Unfinished' collection.

== Van Sitteren & Partners : The Later Years ==
In June 1960, J.G. Dowsett of Van Sitteren & Partners submitted the winning entry in a limited competition for the new Central Sikh Temple. Dowsett worked in the Singapore office, but was also given jobs in Malaya by Singapore clients: for example, he designed the PAR Malayan Paintworks factory in both Singapore and Petaling Jaya. Dowsett proved himself a worthy successor of Van Sitteren and carried the firm's torch for almost another decade.
