= Deborah Klimburg-Salter =

American art historian

Deborah Klimburg-Salter is an art historian and emeritus professor for non-European art history at the Department of Art History of the University of Vienna. She was also director of the research platform Center for Research and Documentation of Inner and South Asia (CIRDIS). Currently she directs the project "Cultural Formation and Transformation: Shahi Art and Architecture from Afghanistan to the Western Frontier at the Dawn of the Islamic Era" financed by the Austrian Science Fund (FWF) and dedicated to transdisciplinary research.

== Academic biography ==
Deborah Klimburg-Salter received her PhD in art history (South Asian and Islamic art) from Harvard University in 1976 and her habilitation in Asian art history from the University of Vienna in 1989.

She was assistant professor at the University of California, Los Angeles from 1978 to 1985 and taught at the Institute for Tibetan and Buddhist Studies in Vienna from 1994 to 2015.

From 1996 Deborah Klimburg-Salter was a professor of non-European art history at the Institute of Art History at the University of Vienna and since 2013 emerita. From 2006 until 2015 she was the founding Director of CIRDIS (Center for Interdisciplinary Research and Documentation of Inner and South Asian Cultural History). Since 2014 she has been an Associate at the Department of South Asian Studies, Harvard University, and since 2018 she is again visiting professor in Asian art history at the Department of Art History at the University of Vienna.

2020 she was appointed visiting professor at the Institute of Tibetan Cultural Heritage, Palace Museum, Beijing. She has also taught as visiting professor at the University of Pennsylvania, the Oriental Institute of the University of Oxford, the Ecole Pratique des Haute Etudes in Paris, and Queen's University in Canada.

== Awards and appointments ==
- 2020 she was awarded the Wilhelm-Hartel-Preis, Austrian Academy of Science
- 2007 she was named "Austrian of the Year" (Science)
- 2009–2010 she was also a Mary L. Cornille Distinguished Visiting professor in the Humanities at Wellesley College
- 2008 she was a visiting fellow at Magdalen College, Oxford University
- 2000–2011 she was a Fellow at the Wissenschaftskolleg zu Berlin
- 1996–1997 she was a Member at the Institute of Advanced Studies, Princeton

== Research projects and fieldwork ==
Mentioned here are only books and catalogues, for complete list of publications see Publications.

During the 1970s study in Afghanistan and Pakistan, India, Central Asia:

- (1989) The Kingdom of Bāmiyān: The Buddhist Art and Culture of the Hindu Kush. Istituto Uversitario Orientale & IsMEO, Naples-Rome.

After the occupation of Afghanistan and following an invitation from the Archaeological Survey of India (ASI) in 1978, she began research on Tabo Monastery in the Spiti Valley, Himachal Pradesh, India. From 1984 to 2000 she was research director for a joint research project on the extensive archive of Giuseppe Tucci between the University of Vienna and the Istituto italiano per il Medio ed Estremo Oriente, and at the Museo Nazionale d'Arte Orientale 'Giuseppe Tucci' on the Tucci-Tangka collection. Following in Tucci's footsteps led to research in the early Buddhist monasteries of Himachal Pradesh and Tibet:

- (1997) Tabo. A Lamp for the Kingdom, Skira, Milan.
- (1998) Tabo. A Lamp for the Kingdom, Thames and Hudson, New York.
- (2006) Tabo Monastery. Art and History. With an Interview of Geshe Sonam Wangdu by Peter Stefan and a Tibetan Summary, Vienna-Delhi.

Generous grants from the Austrian Science Fund (FWF) from 1985 until the present enabled extensive field research in Tibet and northern India. This interdisciplinary research conducted with scholars of different disciplines and young researchers is reflected in eight co-edited volumes:

- (2016) E. Forte, D. Klimburg-Salter, L. Junyan, Z. Yuan, H. Tauscher (eds): Tibet in Dialogue with its Neighbours. History, Culture and Art of Central and Western Tibet, 8th to 15th century, Beijing.
- (2010) M. Alram, D. Klimburg-Salter, M. Inaba, M. Pfisterer (eds): Coins, Art and Chronology II. The First Millennium CE in the Indo-Iranian Borderlands. Österreichische Akademie der Wissenschaften, Vienna.
- (2008) D. Klimburg-Salter, Liang Junyan, H. Tauscher, Zhou Yuan (eds): The Cultural History of Western Tibet. Recent research from the China Tibetology Research Center and the University of Vienna. (Wiener Studien zur Tibetologie und Buddhismuskunde 71), Arbeitskreis für Tibetische und Buddhistische Studien China Tibetology Research Center, Vienna-Beijing.
- (2007) D. Klimburg-Salter, K. Tropper and C. Jahoda (eds): Word, Picture and Song in Transdisciplinary Dialogue. Proceedings of the Tenth Seminar of the International Association for Tibetan Studies, Oxford 2003, Brill, Leiden.
- (2002) D. Klimburg-Salter, E. Allinger (eds): Buddhist Art and Tibetan Patronage 9th to 14th century, Brill, Leiden.
- (1999) (reprint 2002) M. Alram and D. Klimburg-Salter, (eds): Coins, Art, and Chronology. Essays on the pre-Islamic History of the Indo-Iranian Borderlands, Österreichische Akademie der Wissenschaften, Vienna.
- (1998) D. Klimburg-Salter, E. Allinger (eds): The Inner Asian International Style 12th-14th
- Centuries. Papers presented at a panel of the 7th seminar of the International Association for Tibetan Studies, Graz 1995. Edited by Ernst Steinkellner. 7 vols, Vol. VII. Österreichische Akademie der Wissenschaften, Vienna.
- (1992) D. Klimburg-Salter, O. Nalesini & G. Talamo, Abbreviated Inventory of the Tucci Himalayan Photographic Archive 1928-35, Rome.
- (2014) D. Klimburg-Salter, L. Lojda (eds): Changing Forms and Cultural Identity: Religious and Secular Iconographies Vol. 1, Turnhout.
- (2014) M. Meyer and D. Klimburg-Salter (eds.): Visualisierungen von Kult. Böhlau Verlag.

== Museum exhibitions with catalogues ==
- (1982) The Silk Route and the Diamond Path: Esoteric Buddhist Art on the Trans-Himalayan Trade Routes, with contributions by M. Klimburg, D. Snellgrove, F. Staal, M. Strickmann, and C. Trungpa, UCLA Arts Council, Los Angeles.
- (1995) Buddha in Indien. Die frühindische Skulptur von König Aśoka bis zur Guptazeit (exhibition catalogue), Skira, Milan-Vienna.

Research on Tibetan art resulted in two exhibition and catalogues:

- (2013) D. Klimburg-Salter, L. Lojda, C. Ramble (eds): BÖN: Geister aus Butter – Kunst & Ritual des alten Tibet, Katalog zur Ausstellung im Museum für Völkerkunde, Wien, 1.2. bis 1.3.2013.
- (2018) Unknown Tibet: Buddhist Paintings from the Tucci Expeditions, Asia Society Museum, New York.
- (2014/2015) Discovering Tibet. The Tucci Expeditions and Tibetan Painting,” Museo Nazionale d´Arte Orientale “Giuseppe Tucci”, Rome, 4.12.2014- 5.3.2015.
- (2015) Alla scoperta del Tibet, Le Spedizioni di Giuseppe Tucci e I Dipinti Tibetani (a. c.di) Skira, Milan
- (2016) Discovering Tibet–The Tucci Expeditions and Tibetan Painting (ed.). Milan: Skira.

== Heritage preservation ==
Klimburg-Salter used her primary research to the benefit of the Heritage Preservation in the areas in which she worked. Thus, working with both international and local organisations:

- UNESCO International Coordination Committee (ICC) for the safeguarding of Afghanistan's Cultural Heritage from 2003
- From 2003 to 2013 Co-founding member executive committee for the Study of Historic Tibetan Architecture (CSHTA), International Association for Tibetan Studies (IATS)
- From 2002 to 2007 Co-founding Member, Executive Committee, Nako Research and Preservation Project

In collaboration with the National Museum of Afghanistan, Kabul, from 2005 until today, "Kabul Museum Project" supported by the Gerda Henkel Stiftung, in cooperation with the Kunsthistorisches Museum, Vienna, the Austrian Academy of Sciences (ÖAW) as well as Kyoto University, courses and workshops lasting several weeks have been held with Kabul Museum curators in Kabul, Vienna, New Delhi and Kyoto.

== Professional activities ==
- Since 2016 editorial board, Afghanistan Journal, The American Institute of Afghanistan Studies
- Since 2011 editorial board, Tibetan Studies (Zangxue xuekan), periodical of the Institute for Tibetan Studies of Sichuan University, directed by Prof. Huo Wei
- From 2009 to 2016 editorial board, South Asian Studies, Journal of the British Association for South Asian Studies (BASAS), edited by Prof. Adam Hardy
- Since 2008 Board, Arbeitskreis für Buddhistische und Tibetische Studien, University of Vienna
- From 2007 to 2010 President, European Association for South Asian Archaeology and Art (EASAA)
- From 2005 to 2013 International Council of Museums (ICOM), Comm. Red List for Antiquities at Risk, Afghanistan
- Since 1997 Member of the executive board, European Association for South Asian Archaeology and Art (EASAA)
