= De Havenzangers =

Dutch musical group

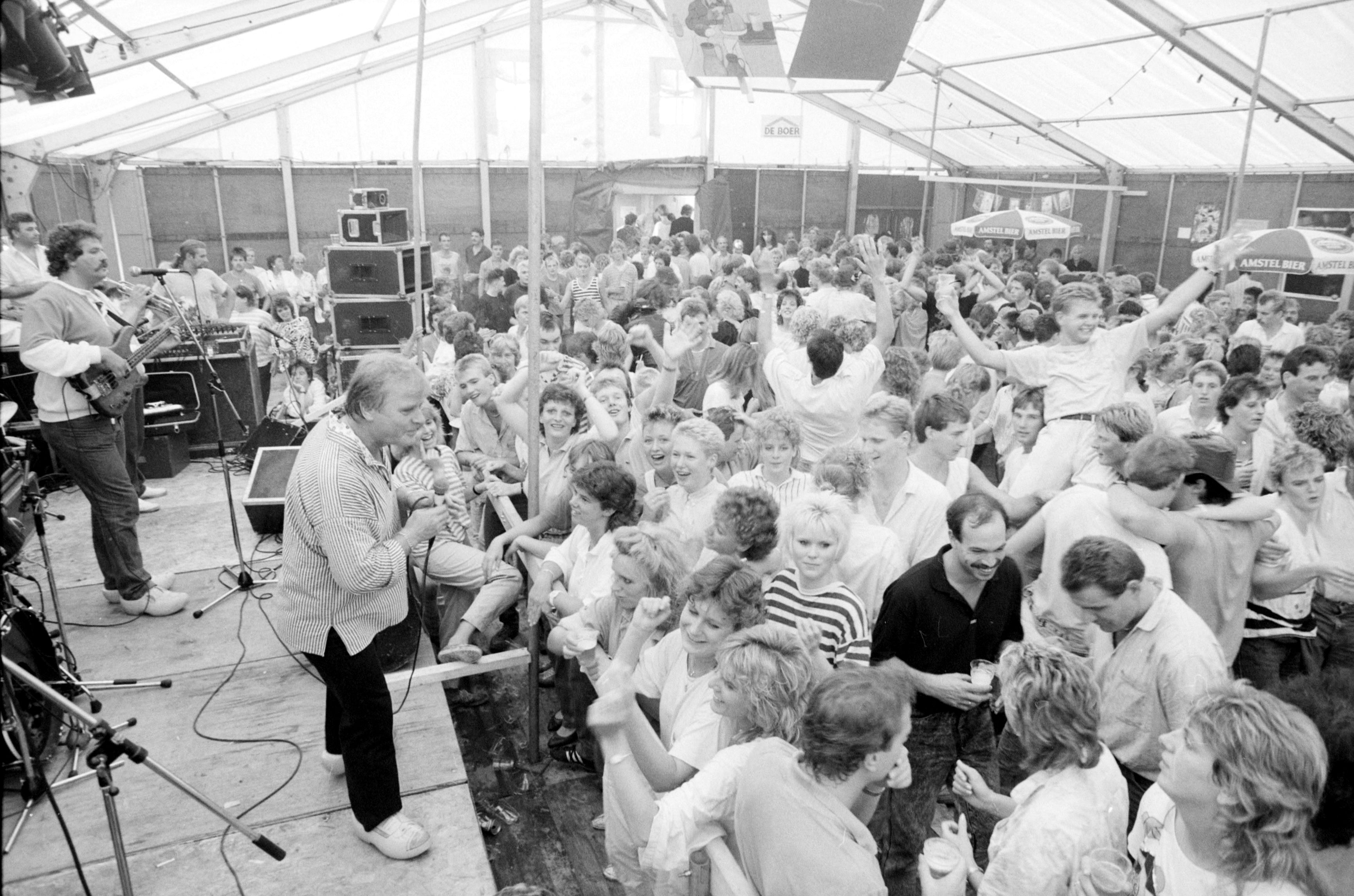

Background information
- Origin: Apeldoorn
- Genres: Traditional Dutch sailor songs and carnival songs
- Years active: 1977–2008
- Past members: Henk Pleket, Theo van Londen, Willem Mulder, Harry Nijkamp, Eric Nijsen.

De Havenzangers were a Dutch musical group who specialized in "traditional Dutch sailor songs and carnival songs.". Founded in Apeldoorn in 1977, they released nine gold and seven platinum albums, and received an Edison Award for the album Ter Land Ter Zee en in 't Café. The Havenzangers split up in 2007.

== History ==
The band was started by singer and guitarist Henk Pleket (born in Arnhem, May 16, 1937), who sang at weddings and parties in the mid-1970s with a group called El Mondo Combo. In 1977, he renamed them De Havenzangers, and their first single, "Aan het strand stil en verlaten," was an immediate hit. Their debut album (with the same title) sold hundreds of thousands of copies. During the 1970s and 1980s, the group scored a succession of hits, including "Trouw niet voor je veertig bent" and "Rome, we komen" (a soccer song written on the occasion of the 1990 FIFA World Cup).

Trumpet player Harry Nijkamp joined the band in 1989 until 1995 when he moved to the USA. In the late 1990s, legal and financial trouble plagued the group, and Pleket was court-ordered to repay a large sum of money to the group's booking agency. By the early 2000s, the group consisted solely of Pleket and Willem Mulder, and stopped performing in 2008. One of their last recordings was a song by Dutch rapper Def Rhymz ("Schudden"), who in turn covered their first hit, "'s Nachts na tweeën." In 2009, because of Pleket's failing health, Pleket quit altogether—at that time, he was performing solo, as Havenzanger Henk Pleket.

Pleket was awarded with knighthood in the Order of Orange-Nassau in 2003, as was his colleague Willem Mulder. He participated in the Dutch TV show De Afvallers in 2007, and died on October 23, 2011, of cancer.
