= Beth Nordholt =

American physicist

- Born: Jane Elizabeth Nordholt
- Known for: Quantum communication, space plasma physics
- Spouse: Richard Hughes
- Scientific career
- Institutions: Los Alamos National Laboratory

Jane Elizabeth (Beth) Nordholt is an American physicist known for her work in space science on mass spectrometry of the solar wind and rings of Saturn and the flow of water vapor in the Earth's polar wind, and for her work in digital security on devices for quantum key distribution and random number generation. Until her retirement, she worked at Los Alamos National Laboratory, which in 2006 named her as a Laboratory Fellow.

== Early life and education ==
Nordholt is the daughter of John B. (Jack) Nordholt Jr., a former Marine and owner of Webster Manufacturing, and of Joanne Pedigo Nordholt. She is a 1976 graduate of Columbian High School in Tiffin, Ohio. She earned a bachelor's degree in 1980 from Rutgers University, and a master's degree in physics in 1983 from the California Institute of Technology.

== Career and research ==
She helped to design the ion mass spectrometer (IMS) for the spacecraft Cassini to gather information on Saturn's environment. She also contributed to instrumentation for NASA Deep Space 1 and Genesis missions.

Nordholt has many patents in the area of quantum communication including quantum key distribution, random number generation, and implementations for optical fiber or free space optical communication. She was a co-team leader for the Los Alamos National Laboratory quantum communications project.

== Awards and honours ==
In 2001, she received an R&D 100 Award as part of the Los Alamos National Laboratory Free-Space Quantum Cryptography project.

She became a laboratory fellow at the Los Alamos National Laboratory in 2006.

== Personal life ==
As of 2013, she was married to Richard Hughes, a physicist and collaborator at Los Alamos National Laboratory.
