= Henk van der Meijden =

Dutch journalist and producer

Henk van der Meyden
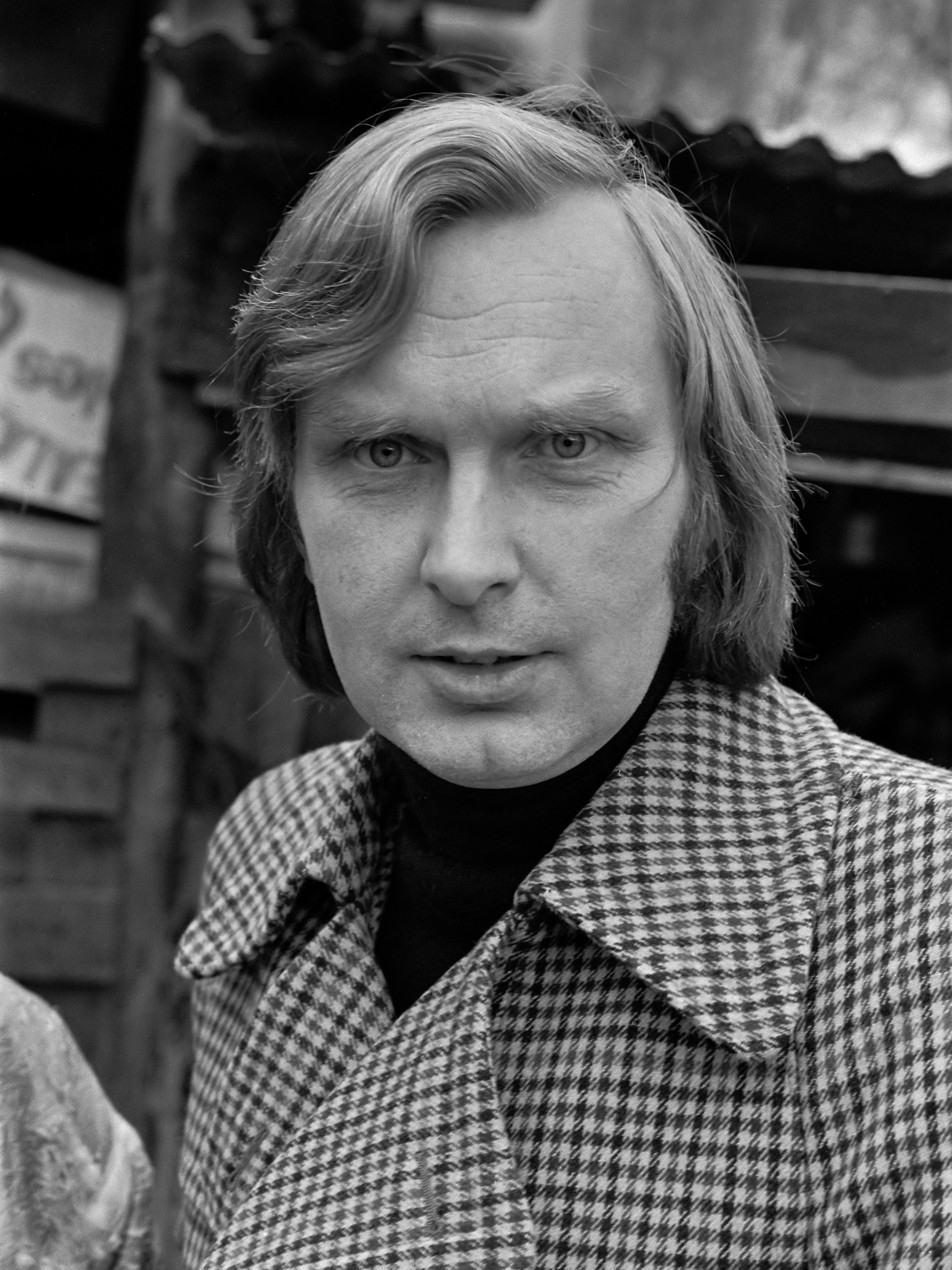
- Henk van der Meijden (1974)
- Born: Henk van der Meyden; 26 June 1937 (age 88); The Hague, Netherlands
- Occupations: Journalist and producer of theater and circus acts

Henk van der Meijden (born 26 June 1937, in The Hague, Netherlands) is a Dutch journalist and producer of theater and circus acts. Known as the "godfather" of Dutch gossip journalism, he founded a weekly gossip magazine, Privé, and edits the gossip pages of De Telegraaf.

== Biography ==
Henk van der Meijden grew up in Bezuidenhout, a neighborhood of The Hague, as the elder of two in a working-class family. At age 16 he started writing children's stories for the publication Het Vaderland, an evening daily. For the Haagsch Dagblad he reported on social events and funerals, and after finishing his secondary education became an apprentice journalist at the Nieuwe Haagsche Courant, where he got his own column. He wrote short stories for other publications and in the 1960s also wrote for the women's magazines Margriet and Libelle.

Van der Meijden's long career with De Telegraaf started officially in 1958, after he had written a series of reports about poor conditions in the Dutch armed forces. His first job was as a crime reporter in The Hague, and in 1959 he was transferred to the main office in Amsterdam, where he got his own section, the showbiz pages, which quickly became the most popular section of the paper. At the end of the 1960s he named this section Privé.

In 1977 he founded a weekly magazine, also called Privé, an extension of the showbiz pages in De Telegraaf. A television program, TV Privé, was soon aired by TROS. He retired as Privé's editor in chief in 1997, and in 2002 he retired from De Telegraaf, to be succeeded by Wilma Nanninga.

Since 1966 van der Meijden has been active as a producer of theater and entertainment, and in the 1970s began bringing international circus acts to the Netherlands. With Joop van den Ende and Benoit Wesley he was co-owner of the Circustheater in Scheveningen in the early 1990s.
