= Henk Schulte Nordholt (art historian) =

Henk Schulte Nordholt (8 March 1909, in Zwolle – 9 November 1998, in Amsterdam) was an art history professor and scholar from the Netherlands. He studied German language and literature, history, and art history at the University of Amsterdam from 1932 until 1939 and then taught German and history at the Rijnlands Lyceum in Wassenaar. He earned a doctorate under Jan Romein (1893–1962) in 1948 from the University of Amsterdam and wrote a historiography of the Renaissance . He admired Jacob Burckhardt.

In 1953 he became a full professor of art and cultural history at the University of Groningen. He was a founder of the Groningen Art History Institute.

== Bibliography ==
- Kunstgeschiedenis als wetenschap (Art History as Science) (1957)
- Het beeld der Renaissance; Een historiografische studie Amsterdam: Querido, 1948
- The Age of Rembrandt: Dutch Paintings and Drawings of the 17th Century. Tokyo: The National Museum of Western Art /Yomiuri Shimbun, 1968
- "Kunstgeschiedenis als wetenschap." in Dijksterhuis, E. J., ed. Scientia, handboek voor wetenschap, kunst en religie 2. Zeist: De Haan, 1957, pp. 1–20
- "Die geistesgeschichtliche Situation der Zeit um 1400." in Europäische kunst um 1400. [Exhibition catalog] Wien: Kunsthistorisches Museum, 1962, pp. 27–51
- Brieven uit Italië: aan mijn vroegere studenten over leven en werk. Groningen: Instituut voor Kunst- en Architectuurgeschiedenis, 1998.
