= Henk Visser (politician) =

Dutch politician

Henk Visser (born 1946) is a Dutch politician of the Reformatory Political Federation (RPF) and its successor the ChristianUnion (CU).

From 1984 to 1987, Visser was Party Chair of the RPF.

From 1990 to 1997, Visser was mayor of Arnemuiden, from 1997 to 2001 he was mayor of Nieuw-Lekkerland, and from 2001 to 2007 mayor of Elburg.
