= Henk Visser (collector) =

Dutch arms and armor collector, businessman, and philanthropist (1923–2006)

Hinderikus Lucas Visser
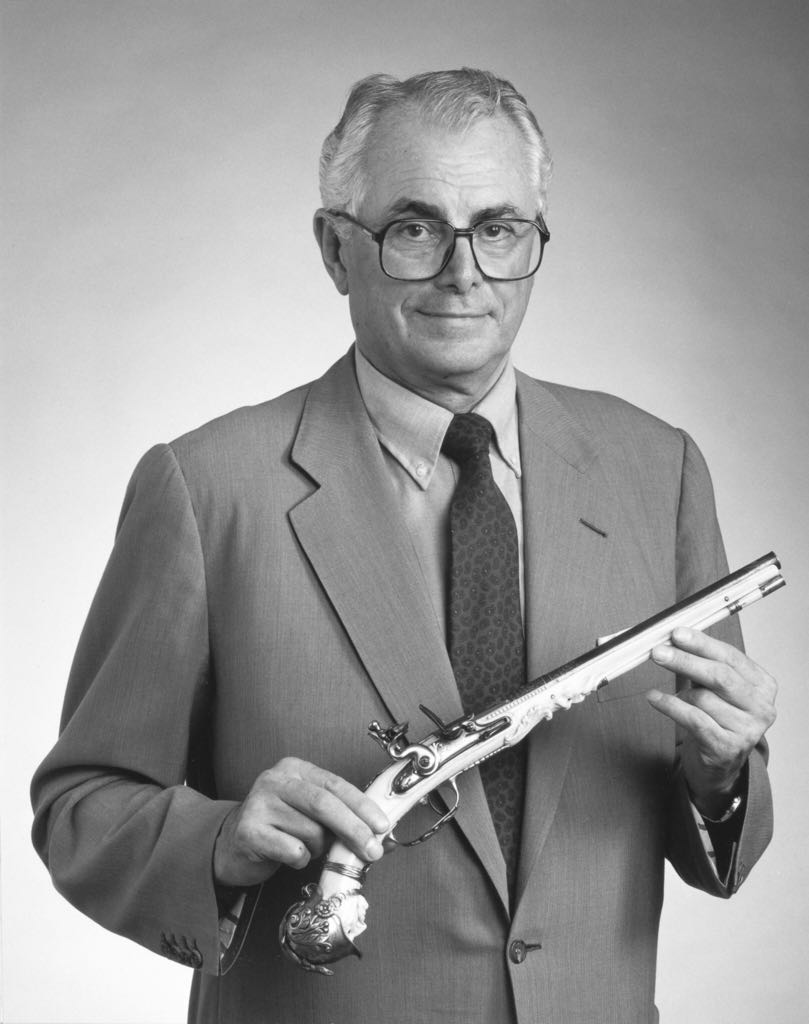
- Henk Visser holding an ivory-stocked pistol
- Born: 5 August 1923; Groningen
- Died: 11 June 2006 (aged 82)

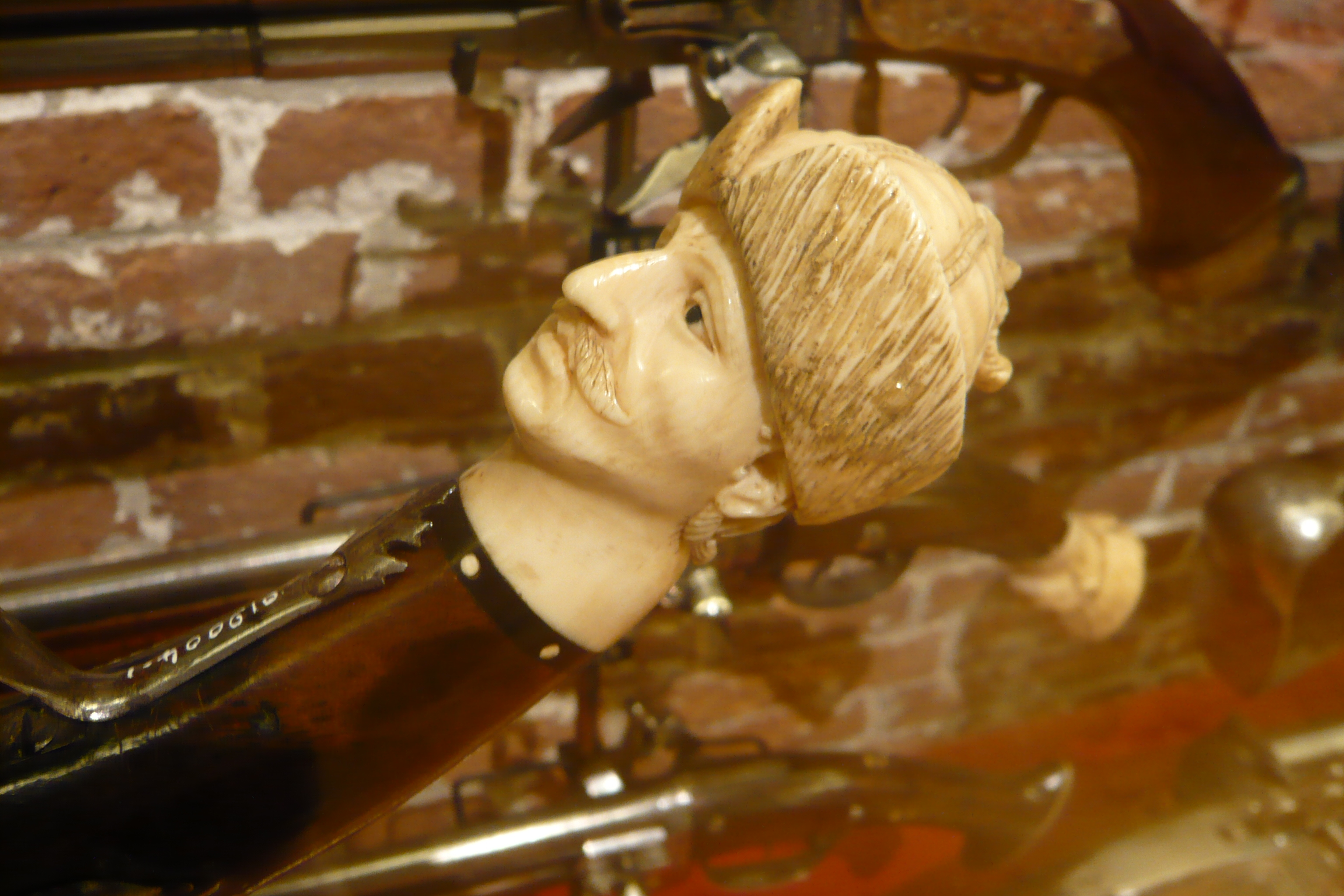
Ivory pistol head from the Visser collection, Legermuseum, Delft

Hinderikus Lucas Visser (5 August 1923 – 11 June 2006), also known as Henk Visser, was a Dutch arms and armor collector, businessman and philanthropist.

The H. L. Visser Collection, specializing in arms from the Dutch Golden Age, is considered one of the largest and most significant private collections of arms and armor ever assembled. The centerpiece of Henk Visser’s collection is an exceptionally rare and important group of ivory-stocked pistols. Curator Jan Piet Puype, who documented the collection, noted that Visser possessed nearly all of the 52 known examples, making his collection unparalleled in historical and cultural significance. Today, valued at an estimated $150 million, the collection resides in the Rijksmuseum and Legermuseum.

== About Henk Visser ==
Visser was born in Groningen and became involved in the Dutch resistance during World War II, while he was still in High School. He was captured, sentenced to death and spent three months on death row before being transferred to prison camp Zuchthaus Siegburg in Germany. After the war, he began working at the munitions factory NVM “De Kruithoorn” and traveled extensively to countries including Russia and Indonesia. During these travels he began his collection of arms and armor. Eventually, he became one of the largest international arms dealers of his time.

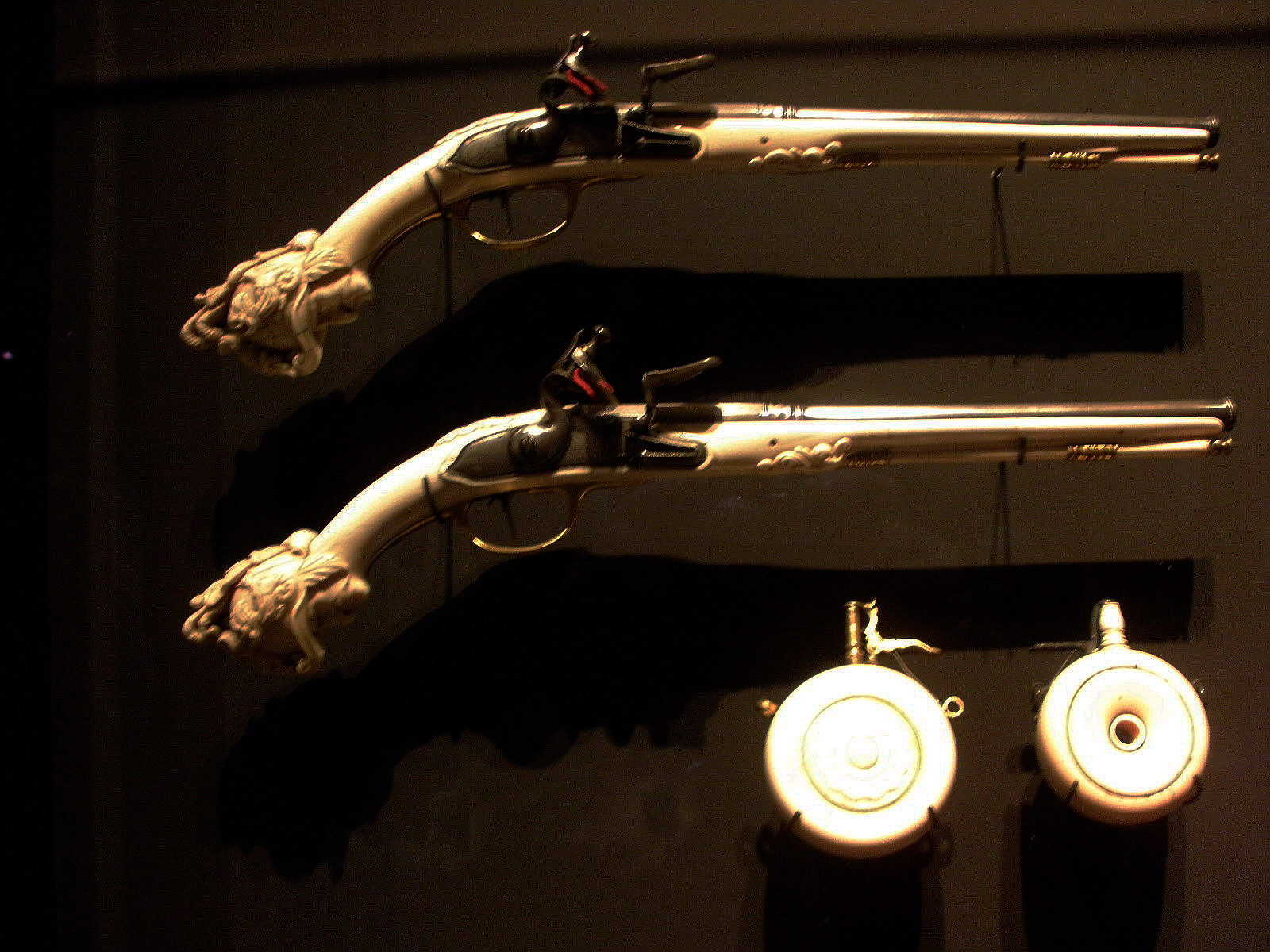
Ivory pistols by Jean Louroux from the Visser collection

== Catalogs ==
- The Visser Collection: Arms of the Netherlands in the Collection of H. L. Visser, Volume I: Catalogue of Firearms, Swords and Related Objects, by Jan Piet Puype, ISBN 90-400-9881-6
- The Visser Collection: Arms of the Netherlands in the Collection of H.L. Visser, Vol. II: Ordnance, by R. Roth, Waanders, Zwolle, 1996, ISBN 90-400-9882-4
