= Henk Temmink =

Dutch chess player

Personal information
- Born: 11 June 1952 (age 74) Elsloo, Netherlands

Henk Temmink (born 11 June 1952, in Elsloo, Limburg) is a Dutch chess player. As profession he is a math teacher in Landgraaf. In 1986 and 1988 he became the champion of Limburg and is master ICCF. In 1980 he became Correspondence chess champion in the Netherlands. He also plays in the championship for teams in Europe.
