= Henk Nijhof =

Dutch politician and educator

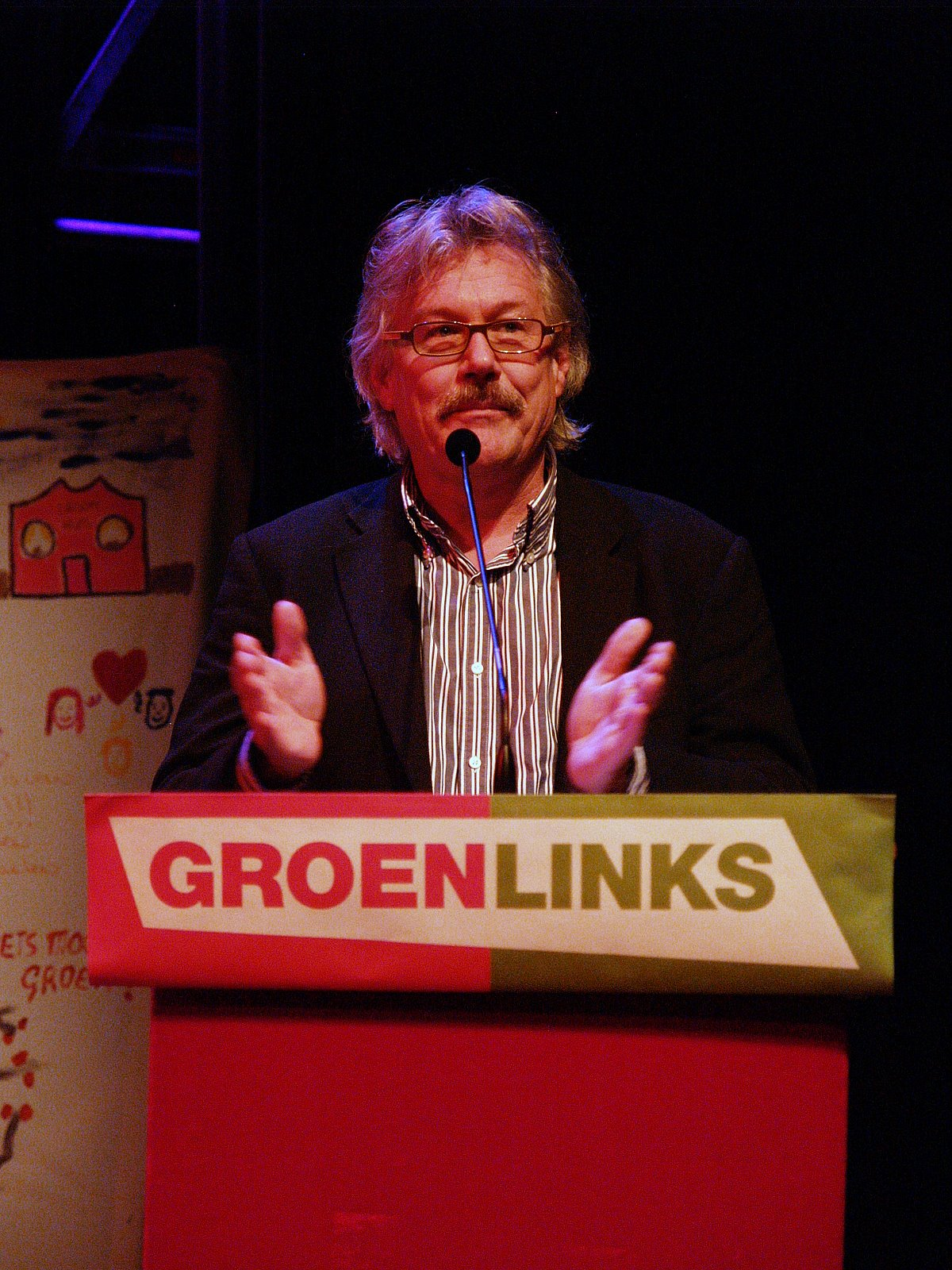
Henk Nijhof

Henk Nijhof (born 8 April 1952) is a Dutch politician and former educator. He is a member of GreenLeft (GroenLinks). From 2006 to 2012 he was Party Chair.

As a PSP politician he was a councillor from 1982 to 1986. From 1994 to 2006 he was an alderman of Hengelo on behalf of GreenLeft.
