= Henk Stallinga =

Dutch artist (born 1962)

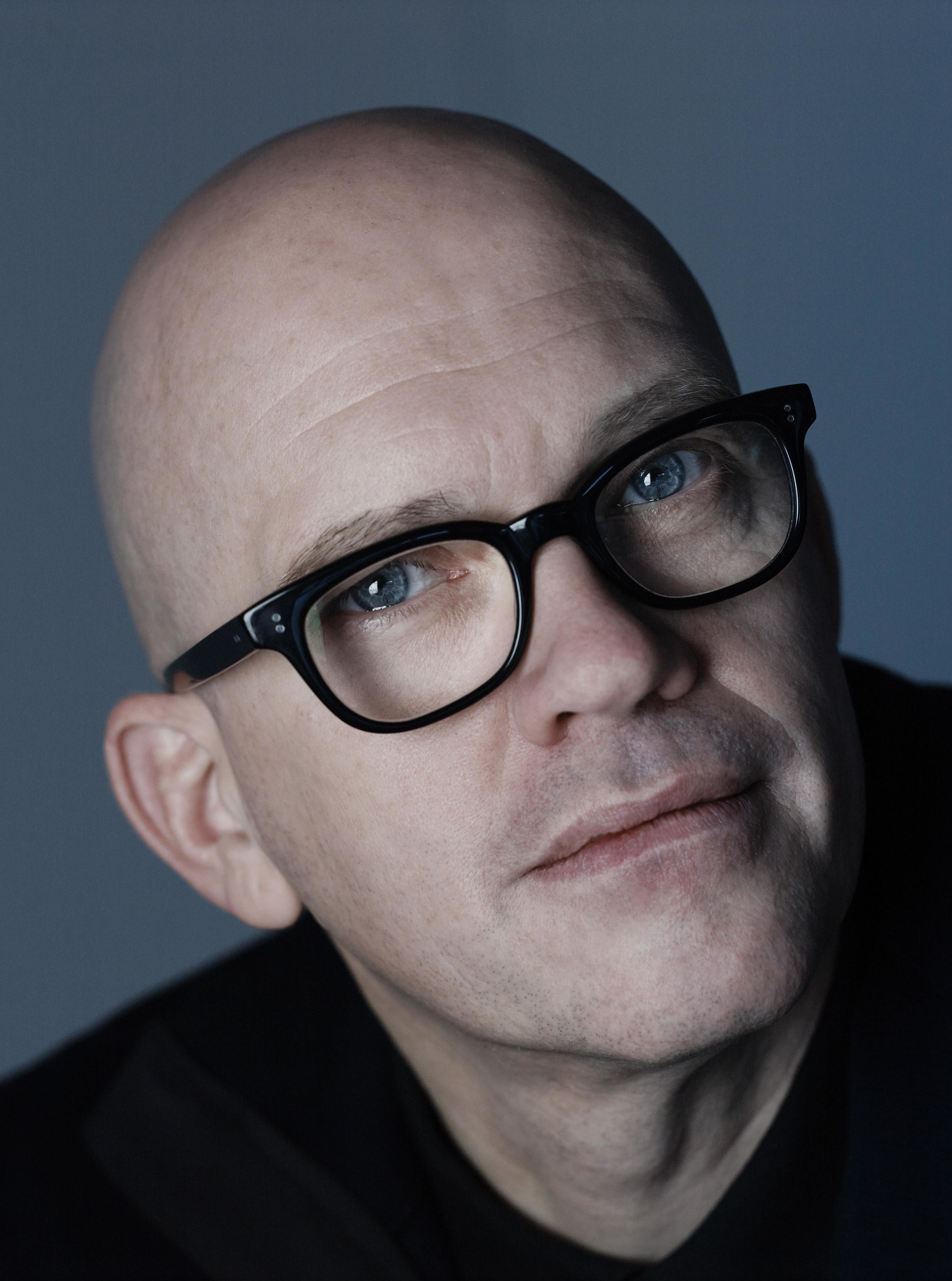
- Portrait of Henk Stallinga
- Born: September 25, 1962 (age 63); Tytsjerksteradiel, Netherlands
- Education: Rietveld Academy
- Website: http://www.stallinga.nl/

Henk Stallinga is a Dutch multidisciplinary contemporary artist based in Amsterdam.

== Biography ==
Henk Stallinga, born 1962, graduated from the Rietveld Academy in Amsterdam in 1993, and established Studio Stallinga the same year. Since 1998, the studio is co-owned by managing partner Annemarie Galani.

Stallinga’s visual language is rooted in De Stijl, Japanese architecture, minimal art and conceptual art. Earlier works of Stallinga challenge the perception of the industrial product, its functionality and meaning.

The ideology behind Stallinga’s works is often based on the awareness of the world around us. This involves concepts like sense of time, sound, and visual perception. Stallinga frequently incorporates parts of mass produced ordinary items, and industrial processes to build his conceptual multimedia installations and sculptures. Presenting every day phenomena are in a different context. Stallinga's recent works combine visual elements with motion and sound.

== Public collections (selection) ==
- MoMA New York
- Fonds National d'Art Contemporain, Paris
- Stedelijk Museum Amsterdam.
- van Abbe Museum
- Achmea Art Collection
- Amsterdam Museum

== Gallery ==
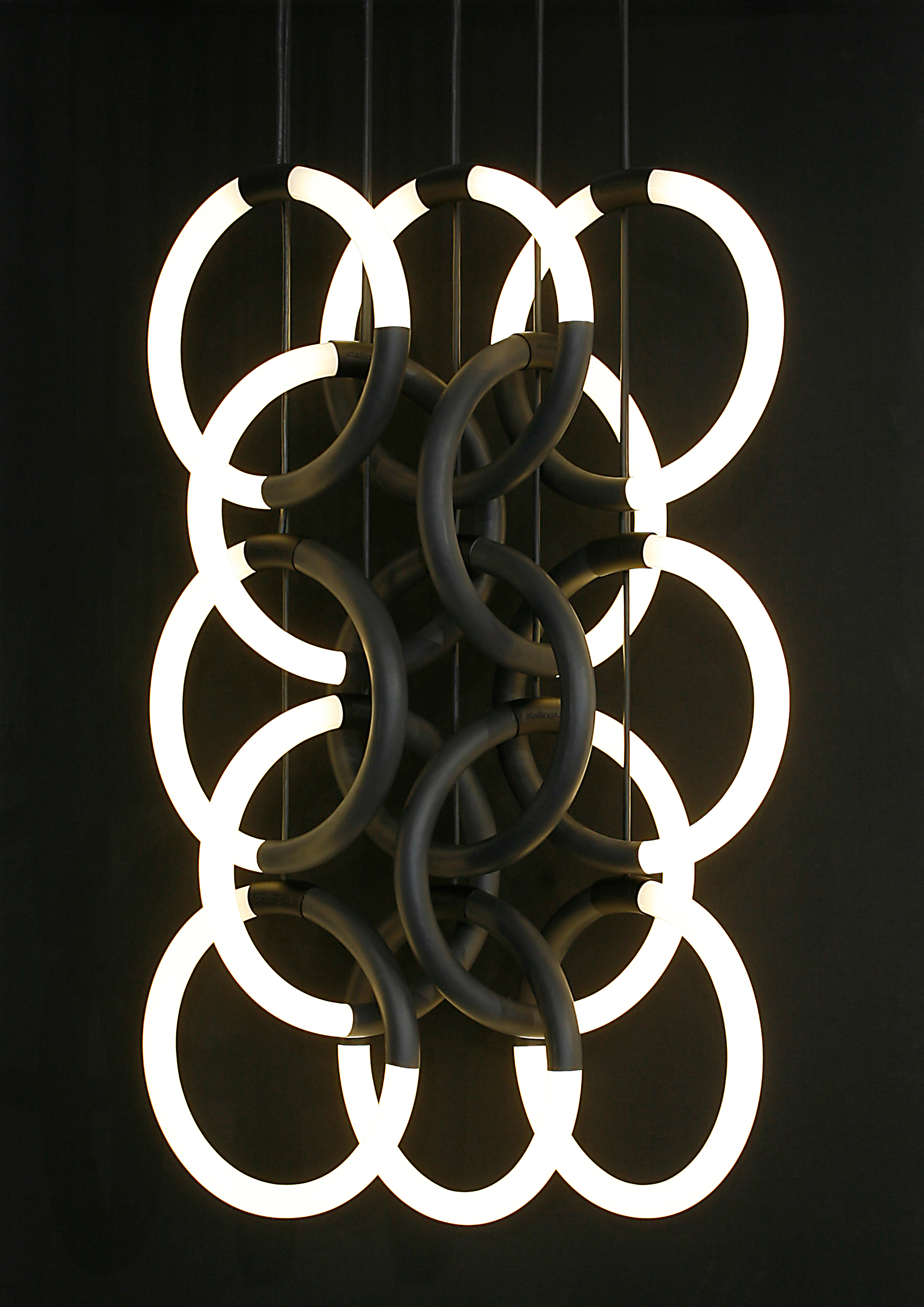
'Dark Hearted' light sculpture by Henk Stallinga, 2016

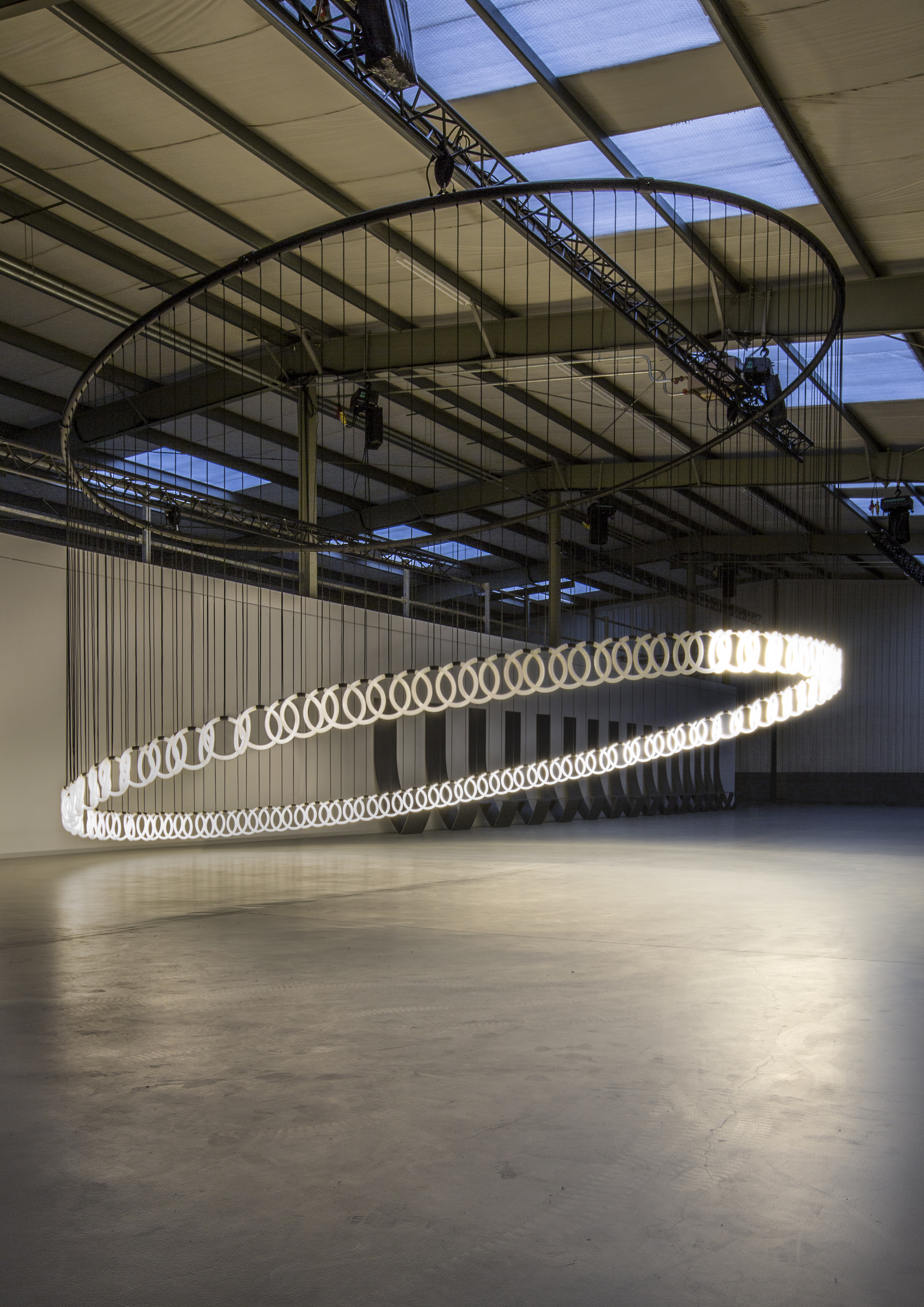
Light sculpture 'Chain Reaction' by Henk Stallinga at studio, 2015

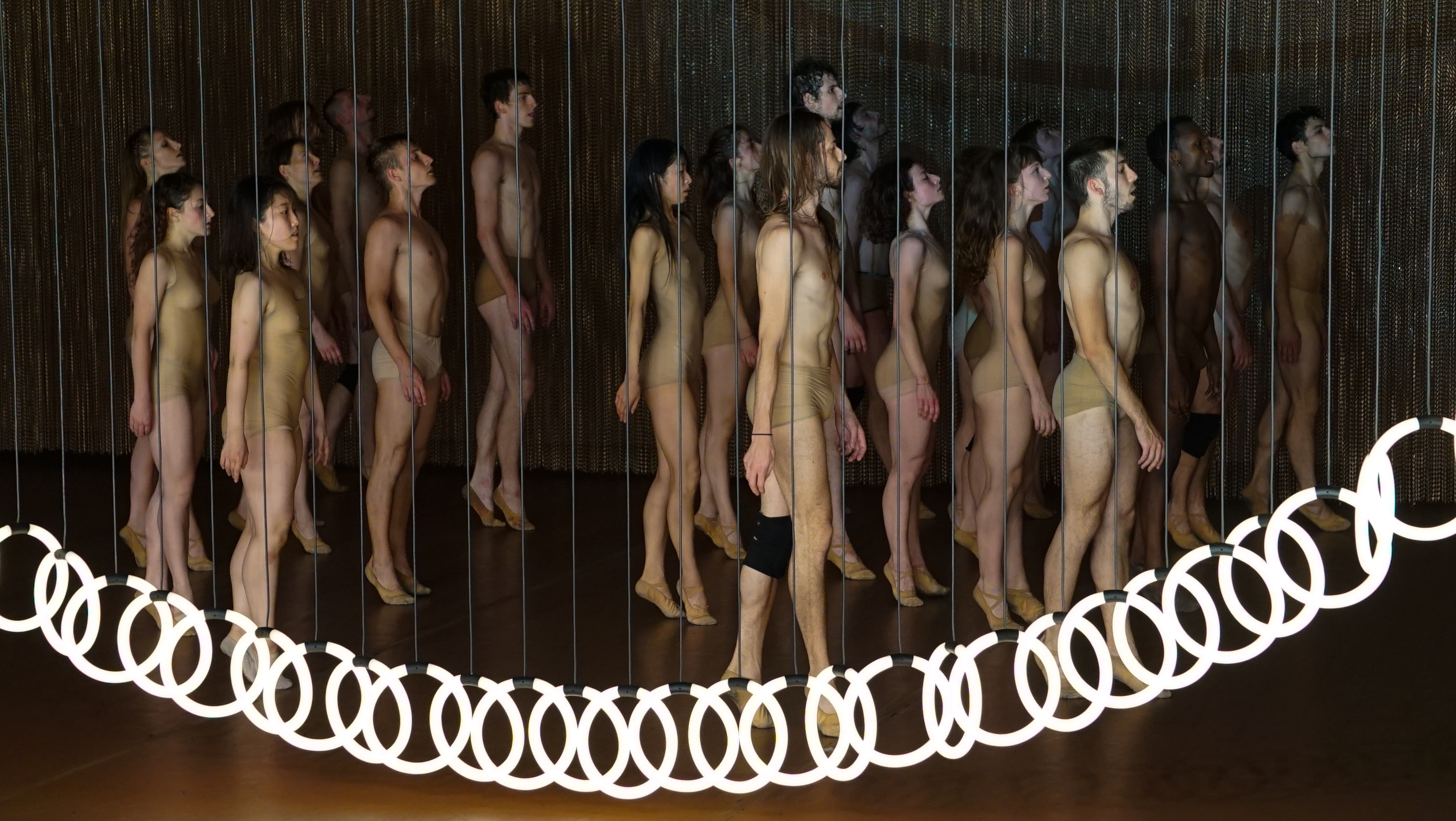
Detail of 'Chain Reaction' at Montpellier Danse, Ballet National de Marseille, 2015

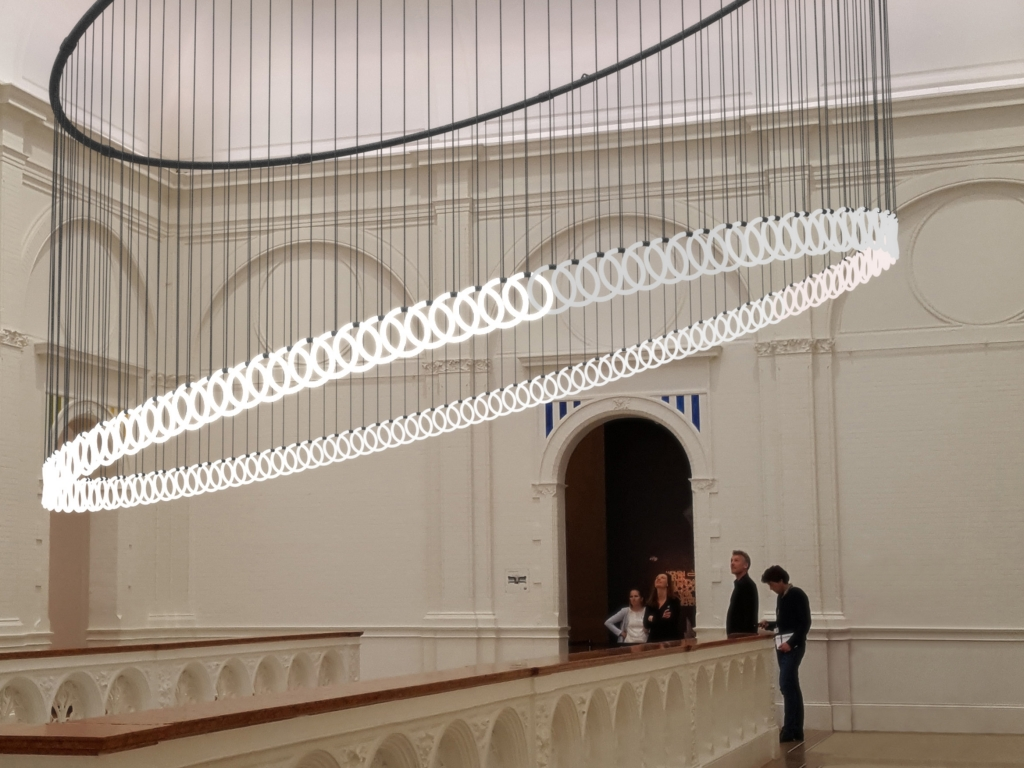
Chain Reaction at Stedelijk Museum Amsterdam 2016
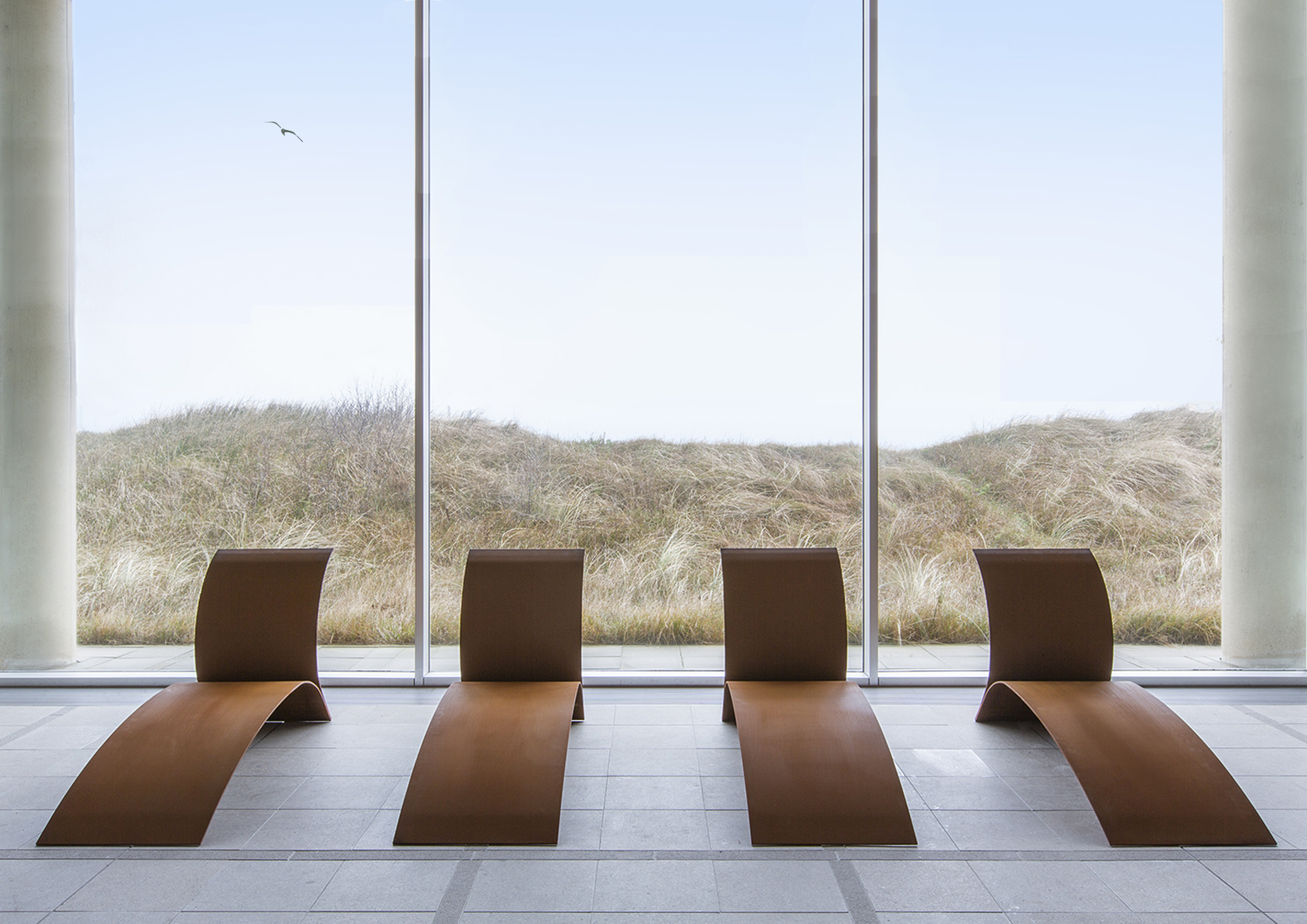
'Lounge Chairs' by Henk Stallinga at Museum Sculptures at Sea, The Hague, 2014

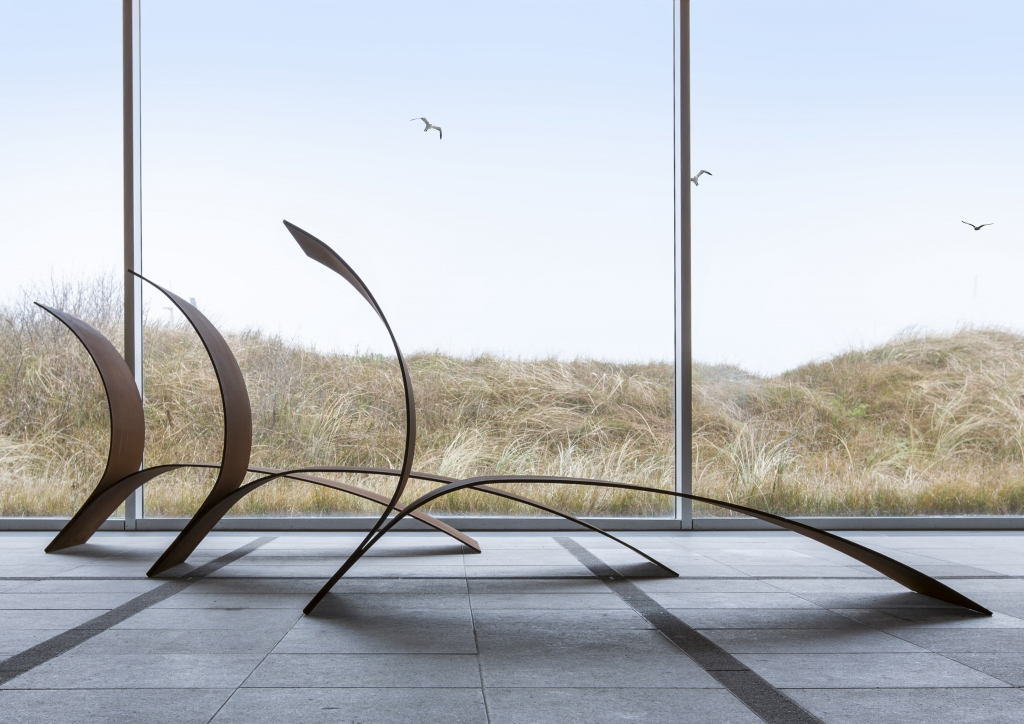
Lounge Chair at Museum Sculptures at Sea, 2014

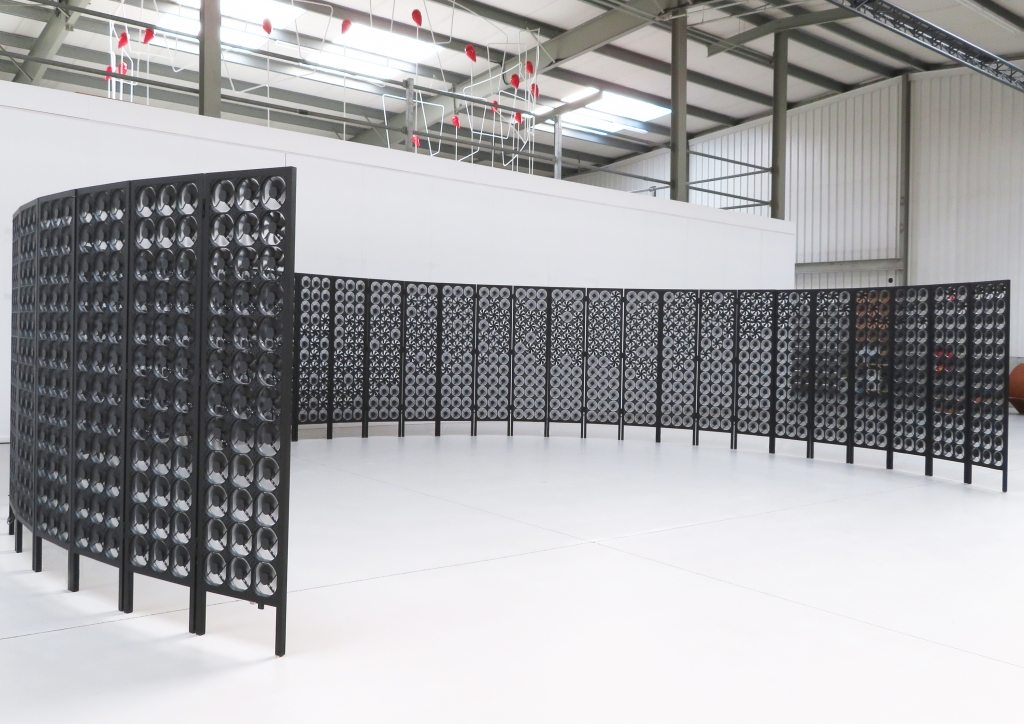
Fanscreen by Henk Stallinga, 2018

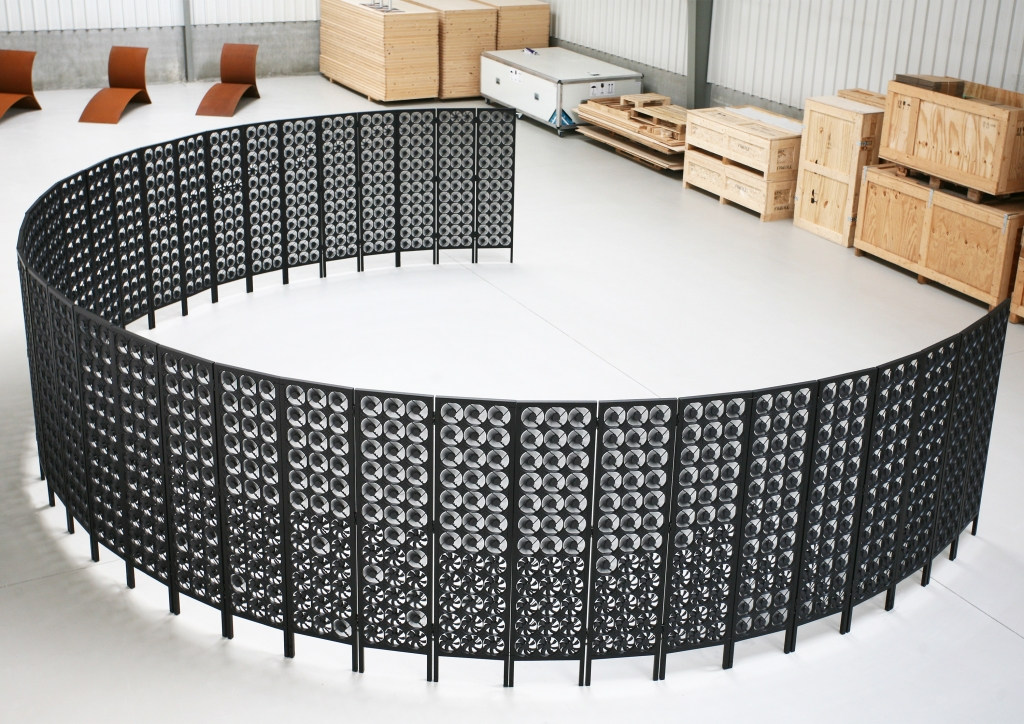
Fanscreen by Henk Stallinga, 2018 topview
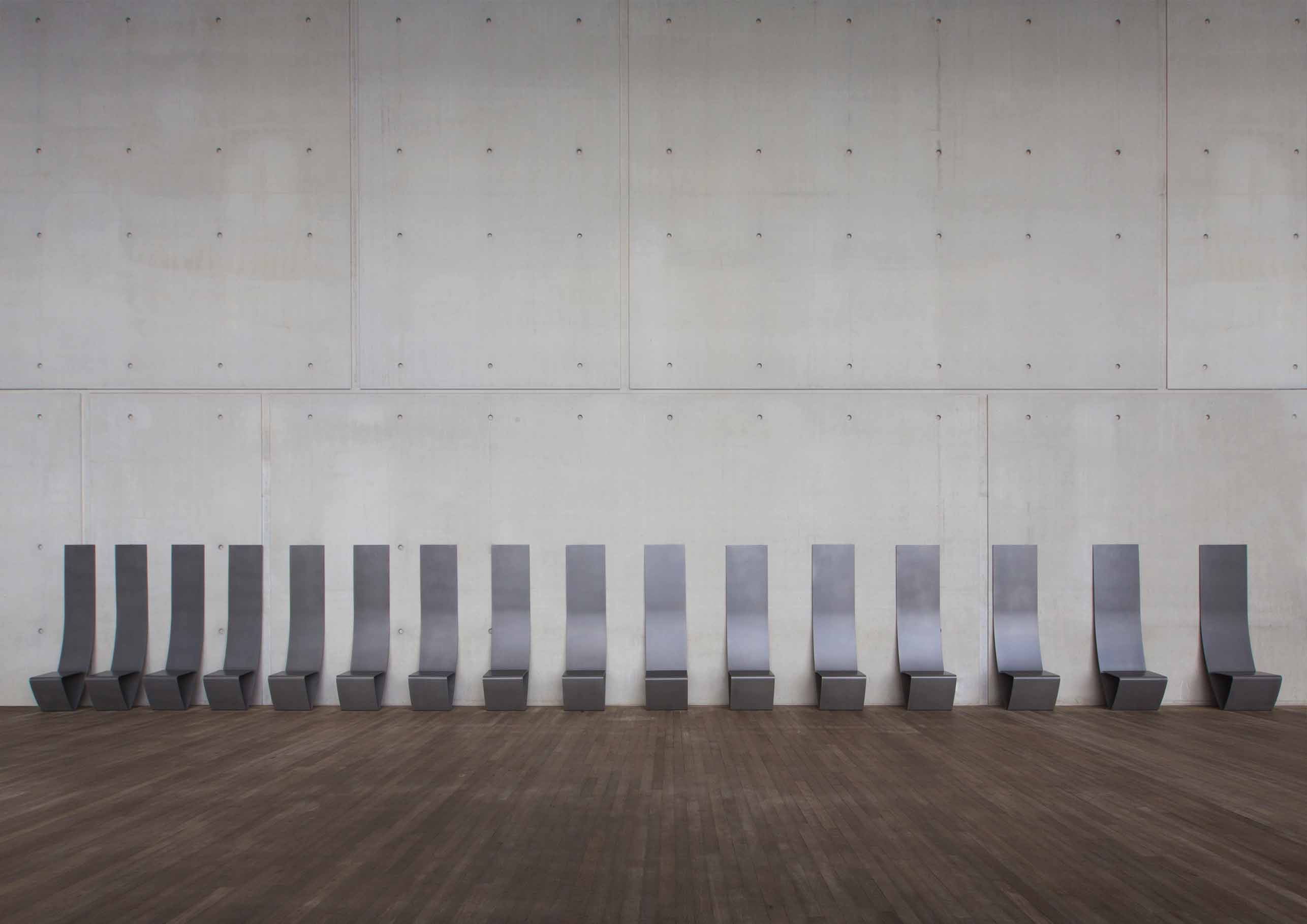
Installation 'Waiting in the Hallway' by Henk Stallinga presented at Muziekgebouw aan 't IJ, Amsterdam, 2013

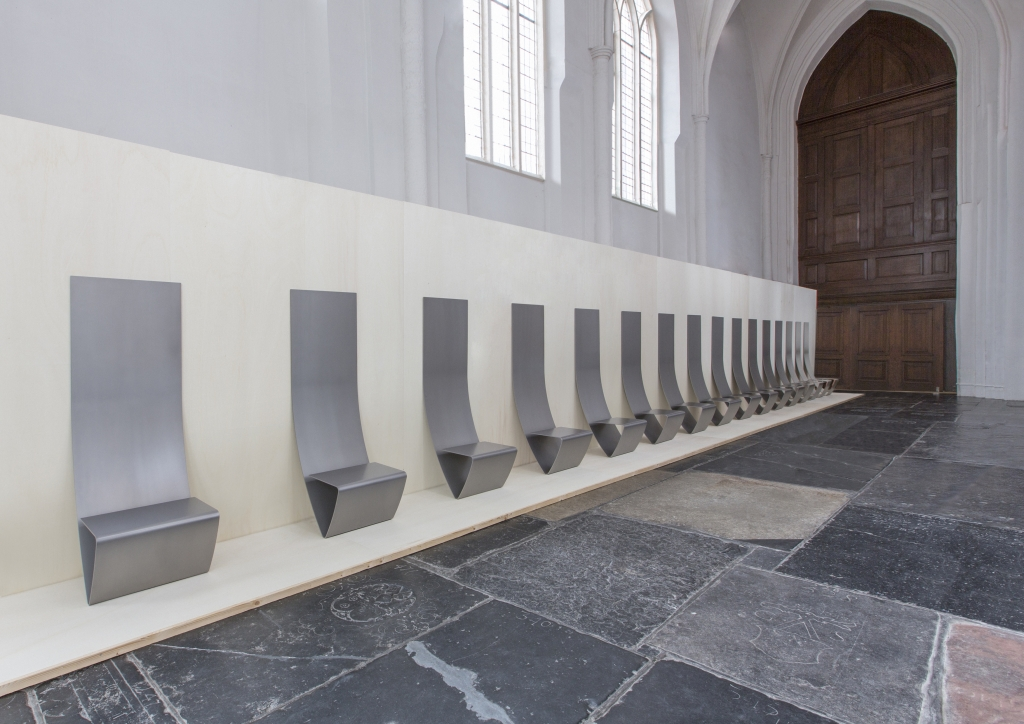
'waiting in the hallway' at der AA church, Netherlands, 2015

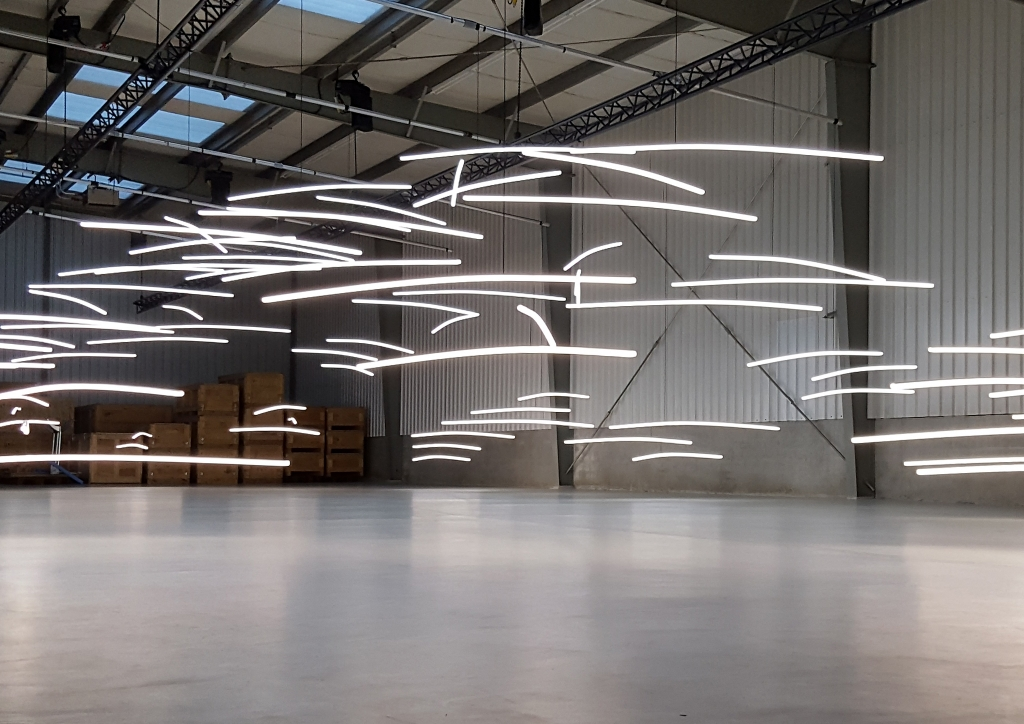
Lumens, light installation by Henk Stallinga, 2017

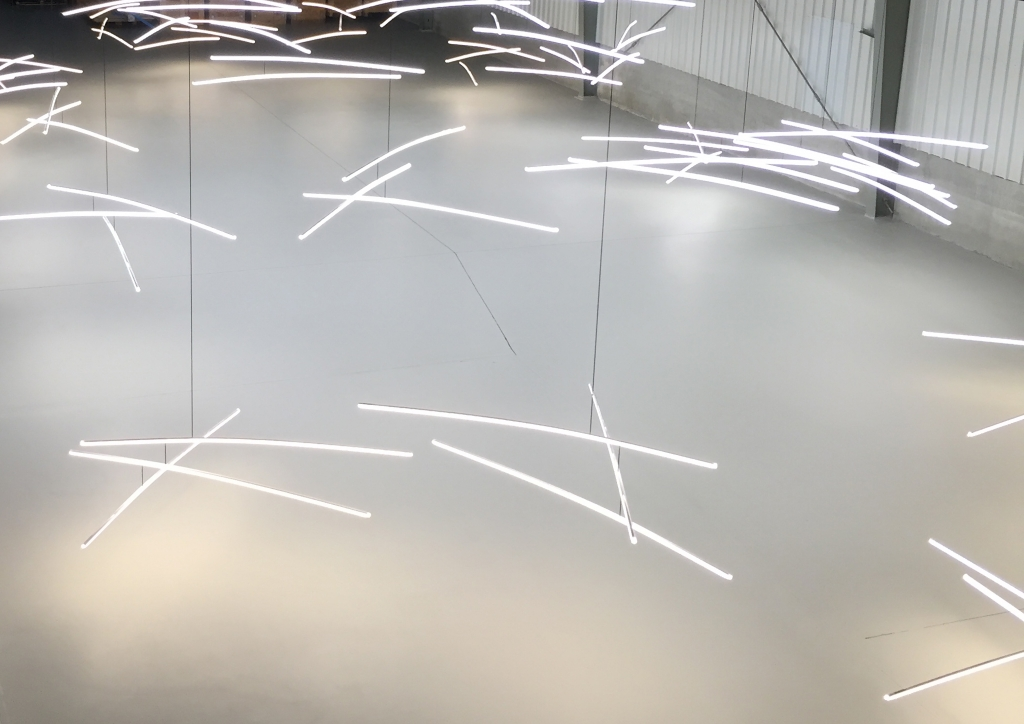
Lumens, topview light installation, 2017
