= European Association for Southeast Asian Studies =

Scholarly non-profit professional association

The European Association for Southeast Asian Studies (EuroSEAS) is dedicated to promoting scholarly collaboration in Southeast Asian studies across Europe. The primary endeavor of EuroSEAS is the organization of a biennial international conference, which convenes hundreds of Southeast Asia specialists from across the globe. While EuroSEAS membership predominantly comprises scholars from the humanities and social sciences, the association imposes no disciplinary boundaries.

== Conference ==
Established in 1992, EuroSEAS conferences are held biennially at various European universities or research centers. To date, these conferences have taken place in Leiden (1995), Hamburg (1998), London (2001), Paris (2004), Naples (2007), Gothenburg (2010), Lisbon (2013), Vienna (2015), Oxford (2017), Berlin (2019), Olomouc (2021), Paris (2022), and Amsterdam (2024).

== Book prizes ==
The EuroSEAS administers and awards two book prizes, in humanities and social science.

=== EuroSEAS Humanities Book Prize ===
The EuroSEAS Humanities Book Prize is awarded for the best academic publication on Southeast Asia within the humanities, encompassing fields such as archaeology, art history, history, literature, performing arts, and religious studies.

==== Humanities book prize winners ====
- 2015 — Mandy Sadan, Being and Becoming Kachin: Histories Beyond the State in the Borderworlds of Burma (Oxford University Press, 2013)
- 2017 — Birgit Tremml-Werner, Spain, China, and Japan in Manila, 1571-1644: Local Comparisons and Global Connections (Amsterdam University Press, 2015)
- 2019 — Lisandro E. Claudio, Liberalism and the Postcolony: Thinking the State in 20th Century Philippines (Kyoto University Press, 2017)
- 2021 — Jack Meng-Tat Chia, Monks in Motion: Buddhism and Modernity Across the South China Sea (Oxford University Press, 2020)
- 2022 — Thongchai Winichakul, Moments of Silence: The Unforgetting of the October 6, 1976 Massacre in Bangkok (University of Hawaiʻi Press, 2020)
- 2024 — Yorim Spoelder, Visions of Greater India: Transimperial Knowledge and Anti-Colonial Nationalism, c.1800–1960 (Cambridge University Press, 2023)

=== EuroSEAS Social Science Book Prize ===
The EuroSEAS Social Science Book Prize is awarded for the best academic publication on Southeast Asia within the social sciences, covering disciplines such as anthropology, economics, law, politics and international relations, and sociology.

==== Social science book prize winners ====
- 2015 — Philip Taylor, The Khmer Lands of Vietnam: Environment, Cosmology and Sovereignty (NUS Press, 2014)
- 2017 — Pamela McElwee, Forests Are Gold: Trees, People, and Environmental Rule in Vietnam (University of Washington Press, 2016)
- 2019 — David Kloos, Becoming Better Muslims: Religious Authority and Ethical Improvement in Aceh, Indonesia (Princeton University Press, 2018)
- 2021 — Christina Schwenkel, Building Socialism: The Afterlife of East German Architecture in Urban Vietnam (Duke University Press, 2020)
- 2022 — Lukas Ley, Building on Borrowed Time: Rising Seas and Failing Infrastructure in Semarang (University of Minnesota Press, 2021)
- 2024 — Michael Dwyer, Upland Geopolitics: Postwar Laos and the Global Land Rush (University of Washington Press, 2022)
