= Heikki =

Male given name

Heikki is a Finnish and Estonian male given name. It derives from a medieval vernacular form of the name Henrik. Notable people with the name include:

- Heikki Aho (footballer) (born 1983), Finnish footballer
- Heikki A. Alikoski (1912–1997), Finnish astronomer
- Heikki Aalto (born 1961), Finnish ice hockey player
- Heikki Häiväoja (1929–2019), Finnish sculptor
- Heikki Haravee (1924–2003), Estonian actor
- Heikki Hasu (1926–2025), Finnish Nordic skier
- Heikki von Hertzen (1913–1985), Finnish jurist and urban planner
- Heikki Holmås (born 1972), Norwegian politician
- Heikki Ikola (born 1947), Finnish biathlete
- Heikki Jaansalu (born 1959), Estonian sports shooter
- Heikki Koort (1955–2021), Estonian diplomat, sports figure and actor
- Heikki Koski (1940–2024), Finnish civil servant and politician
- Heikki Kovalainen (born 1981), Finnish former Formula One driver
- Heikki Kyöstilä (born 1946), Finnish billionaire, founder, owner and president of dental equipment maker Planmeca
- Heikki L, real name Heikki Liimatainen, Finnish house music producer
- Heikki Liimatainen (athlete) (1894–1980), Finnish athlete
- Heikki Kähkönen (1891–1962), Finnish wrestler
- Heikki Mäkelä (born 1946), Finnish sprint canoer
- Heikki Mikkola (born 1945), Finnish motocross racer
- Heikki Nurmio (1887–1947), Finnish jäger and writer
- Heikki Oja (born 1945), Finnish astronomer and writer
- Heikki Paasonen (presenter) (born 1983), Finnish television presenter
- Heikki Palmu (born 1946), Finnish writer
- Heikki Salmela (born 1946), Finnish businessman
- Heikki Savolainen (1907–1997), Finnish artistic gymnast
- Heikki Silvennoinen (1954–2024), Finnish musician and actor
- Heikki Siren (1918–2013), Finnish architect
- Heikki Vääräniemi (born 1969), Finnish pole vaulter
- Heikki Westerinen (born 1944), Finnish chess player

== See also ==
- Henrik
