= Carrols Restaurant Group =

American franchisee company

Carrols Restaurant Group, Inc.
- Type: Subsidiary
- Traded as: Nasdaq: TAST
- Industry: Restaurants
- Founded: 1960; 66 years ago
- Founder: Herbert N. Slotnik
- Headquarters: Syracuse, New York, U.S.
- Number of locations: 1,000 O&O; 30 franchised
- Area served: United States, Puerto Rico, Ecuador
- Key people: Deborah Derby (CEO)
- Products: Burger King, Popeyes (franchisees)
- Revenue: US$1.52 billion (Fiscal year 2019)
- Operating income: US$20 million (FY 2009)
- Net income: US$211.01 million (FY 2019)
- Total assets: US$440 million (2009)
- Number of employees: More than 10,000
- Parent: Restaurant Brands International (2024–present)
- Website: www.carrols.com

Carrols Restaurant Group, Inc. is an American franchisee company and is the largest Burger King franchisee in the world; Carrols owns and operates over 1,000 Burger Kings, and 55 Popeyes restaurants. The company has operated Burger Kings since 1976 in locations across 23 U.S. states.

The company has its roots in the Carrols hamburger restaurant chain which operated in parts of the U.S. beginning circa 1960. The domestic locations were converted to Burger King restaurants beginning in 1975, though the brand survived in other parts of the world, until as late as 2012 in Finland.

For a time following the 1975 conversion to Burger King, the company also owned the restaurant chains Pollo Tropical and Taco Cabana.

== History ==
An offshoot of the Tastee-Freez company, the original Carrols hamburger chain was named after the Tastee-Freez co-owner Leo S. Maranz's daughter, Carol.

Herb Slotnick bought the franchise rights for the New York area and started opening restaurants in the Syracuse, New York, area in the early 1960s. They expanded over the years throughout New York State. During the 1960s, a yellow slug character served as Carrols' first mascot, replaced in 1974 by a young blonde boy wearing a tweed suit and a Fedora hat.

At the chain's peak in the late 1960s, the company had 120 Carrols restaurants throughout New York state. Most Carrols restaurant locations were converted to Burger King franchises in 1975, with less profitable stores shuttered. After the conversion, the Carrols brand was only found overseas in Finland, Sweden, Estonia, Latvia and Russia – except for two stores: one on Roosevelt Avenue in Carteret, New Jersey, which closed in the late 1970s; and a single franchisee-owned store in Batavia, New York. Both of these latter two stores operated under the Carrols name into the 1980s, before closing.

The Finnish group Carrols opened up several locations in St Petersburg, Russia in the mid-to-late 1990s. In 1998 it opened its first operation in Moscow located at the then-new Ohotni Riad Mall. Because of the 1998 Russian financial crisis, the operations did not generate enough sales for Carrols, and by 2000 all Carrols outlets in Russia had been closed.

The Finnish restaurant company Hesburger started to buy out the last existing Carrols locations in Helsinki, Finland in the mid-2000s, with locations converted by 2012.

On December 9, 2005, Carrols Holdings and Mimi's Café was filed for offerings.

In February 2011 the company announced it was divesting itself of its two Central American-themed chains, Taco Cabana and Pollo Tropical, in a spin-off aimed at helping the company focus on its core Burger King operations. The sale of the two chains, collectively called the Fiesta Restaurant Group, was completed in May 2012.

In June 2012, Carrols acquired 278 Burger King locations from Burger King for approximately $150 million. In exchange, the Burger King parent, Burger King Corporation took a 28.9% stake in the company. The transaction involved a line of credit that would be used by Carrols to renovate more than 450 of its stores.

In 2014, Carrols acquired 64 Burger King locations from Heartland Food Corporation, including 27 locations in Nashville, Tennessee, 11 in Springfield, Illinois and 22 in Indiana.

On February 20, 2019, Carrols announced a merger with Cambridge Franchise Holdings LLC in a deal worth 238 million dollars, which would add 55 Popeyes and 166 Burger King locations in the southern United States to Carrols' portfolio. The transaction would be "structured as a tax-free merger". Carrols will give Cambridge around 7.36 million common shares. Also included in the deal, Cambridge will get 9% of Carrols preferred stock. The acquisition was completed on May 1, 2019.

On February 22, 2022, Carrols named a new CEO, former McDonald's executive Paulo Pena, effective April 1, 2022. Then-current CEO Dan Accordino would retire.

On January 16, 2024, Burger King and Popeyes owner Restaurant Brands International (RBI) announced that it would buy Carrols in an all-cash transaction worth approximately US$1.0 billion. RBI said it intended to rapidly remodel 600 Carrols-owned Burger King locations to current company standards, and refranchise them back to smaller local operators.

On May 16, 2024, it was announced that RBI had completed the purchase of Carrols Restaurant Group.

== Theaters ==
Beginning in the early 1970s, Carrols owned and operated the CinemaNational movie theater chain, until their sale to Mid-States Theaters and USA Cinemas in the early and mid-1980s. The theaters were concentrated in central New York State, but there were locations as far away as Wisconsin, Idaho and California. The chain consisted mostly of large single-screen locations that had been purchased from companies like Kallet, Hallmark and Dipson Theaters, along with new locations that were built by Slotnick. CinemaNational also built some triple-screen multiplex locations in sites like Penn-Can Mall in Cicero, New York, and Fayetteville Mall in Fayetteville, New York, as well as Evansville, Indiana.
