= Fiesta Restaurant Group =

American restaurant company

- Company type: Subsidiary
- Traded as: Nasdaq: FRGI
- Industry: Restaurant
- Founded: 2012; 14 years ago
- Headquarters: Dallas, Texas, United States
- Revenue: 660,943,000 United States dollar (2019)
- Number of employees: 10,000 (2019)
- Parent: Authentic Restaurant Brands (2023–present)
- Website: frgi.com

Fiesta Restaurant Group is an American restaurant chain headquartered in Dallas, Texas, primarily owning Pollo Tropical branded locations in Florida. The company was a Corporate spin-off from Carrols Restaurant Group in 2012.

Stock in the company was traded on NASDAQ as FRGI until October 2023 when it was taken private by investment firm Garnett Station Partners through its subsidiary Authentic Restaurant Brands.

By 2019, Fiesta's revenue was $661 million and it employed over 10,000 people.

== History ==
In 2011, Carrols Restaurant Corp. announced its intentions of separating its Hispanic brands and Burger King restaurant business into two separate public companies. The Hispanic brands were placed under Fiesta Restaurant Group, the new subsidiary of Carrols Restaurant Corp. Fiesta Restaurant Group companies had a combined revenue of $439.1 million in 2010.

In August 2011, Carrols Restaurant Corp named Tim Taft the CEO of Fiesta Restaurant Group (FRG), succeeding Fiesta chairman Alan Vituli. By the time the separation of the brands was complete in 2011, FRG saw an 8.2 percent revenue increase for the year and finished at $475.0 million in 2011.

In April 2012, Carrols Restaurant Corp agreed to allow Fiesta to spin-off with Taco Cabana and Pollo Tropical. On May 8, when the spin-off was completed, the company went public on NASDAQ under the symbol FRGI on May 8, 2012.

As of 2014, Fiesta continued to own Taco Cabana. As of January 3, 2016, Fiesta had 162 company-owned and six franchised Taco Cabana restaurants.

In February 2016, Fiesta announced that it would split its two brands, Taco Cabana and Pollo Tropical, into two separate companies. Over the next year or two, it was announced that all of Taco Cabana's stock would be distributed to Fiesta shareholders, and that Fiesta would be renamed Pollo Tropical. The plan to separate Pollo Tropical and Taco Cabana was dropped in September 2016. At the time, there were plans to open up to 10 new Taco Cabana restaurants in Texas, adding to the 164 company-owned stores and 7 franchised ones.

In 2017, the store saw some declines in sales in the second quarter, which Fiesta attributed to less marketing. As of July 2017, it had 176 Taco Cabana stores. On January 14, 2020, it was announced that Fiesta Restaurant Group will be closing 19 Texas Taco Cabanas immediately, citing - “eliminate all stores with significant losses".

During the COVID-19 pandemic, Fiesta received $15 million in federally backed small business loans from J.P. Morgan as part of the Paycheck Protection Program. The company received scrutiny over these loans, which were aimed at small businesses. A week later, the company returned the money.

The company headquarters is in 17,700 square feet (1,640 m^{2}) of office space in Suite 200 of the 8918 Tesoro Drive building in Uptown San Antonio, Texas.

In July 2021, Fiesta Restaurant Group announced that it had agreed to sell all outstanding equity of Taco Cabana Inc. to an affiliate of Yadav Enterprises for a cash purchase price of $85M to fully repay the company's approximately $74.6 million outstanding term loan borrowings.
