= Kyösti =

Kyösti is a Finnish male given name and a variant of Kustaa. Notable people with the name include:

- Kyösti Haataja, twentieth century Finnish politician
- Kyösti Kakkonen (born 1956), Finnish businessman, and art collector
- Kyösti Kallio (1873–1940), fourth President of Finland (1937–1940)
- Kyösti Karhila (1921–2009), Finnish World War II fighter ace with 32 1/4 victories
- Kyösti Karjalainen (born 1967), ice hockey player
- Kyösti Karjula (born 1952), politician and member of the Finnish Parliament from Lumijoki
- Kyösti Kylälä, Finnish railroad engineer and inventor
- Kyösti Laasonen (born 1945), Finnish archer
- Kyösti Lallukka (1944–2010), Finnish politician
- Kyösti Lehtonen (1931–1987), Finnish wrestler and Olympic champion in Greco-Roman wrestling
- Kyösti Luukko (1903–1970), Finnish wrestler and Olympic medalist
- Kyösti Virrankoski (1944–2026), Finnish politician and member of the European Parliament

== See also ==
- Kyöstilä
