= KAVO =

KAVO or Kavo may refer to:

- KAVO (FM), a radio station (90.9 FM) licensed to Pampa, Texas, United States
- Avon Park Executive Airport's IATA code
- KaVo Kerr, a major supplier of dental equipment and software
- Kavo, a minor character in The Emperor's New School

== People with the surname ==
- Havila Kavo, Papua New Guinean politician
