= KaVo Dental =

German dental equipment manufacturer

- Type: Subsidiary
- Industry: Dentistry
- Founded: 1891; 135 years ago
- Headquarters: Biberach, Germany
- Area served: Worldwide
- Key people: Amir Aghdaei
- Products: Dental equipment including: Restoratives; Endodontics; Infection control Imaging; Handpieces; Dental chairs Training and education for dental professionals
- Parent: Planmeca
- Website: www.kavo.com

KaVo Dental is a German dental equipment manufacturer that is headquartered in Biberach and has operations worldwide. It has been a part of Finish company Planmeca since 2022. The company manufactures dental equipment such as restoratives, endodontics, infection control systems, imaging handpieces, and dental chairs as well as providing training and education for dental professionals.

The company had a complex history of mergers and splits that included the company Kerr, Kavo and a division of Danaher Corporation. The group itself stemmed from a joint venture set up in 2016 between KaVo (KaVo Dental GmbH), which was established in 1909 in Berlin, Germany, and Kerr Corporation, which was founded in 1891 in Detroit, Michigan, as well as a division of Danaher Corporation headquartered in Brea, California.

In December 2019, Danaher spun off its dental segment into an independent publicly traded company - Envista Holdings Corporation. In 2022, Envista sold the Kavo Kerr business to Planmeca.

== History ==
=== Kerr ===
Kerr was established in 1891 in Detroit, Michigan by brothers Robert and John Kerr as The Detroit Dental Manufacturing Company and started to offer its products and services to the European market in 1893. The company officially changed its name to The KERR Manufacturing Company in 1939.

The company established its first factory in Europe in Scafati, Italy in 1959. Kerr acquired part of the McShirley line of products in 1971. Later in 1978, the Sybron Dental Product Division was formed.

In 2001, Kerr acquired Hawe Neos company in the aim of enhancing its offer of prophylaxis consumables. In 2006, Kerr became part of Danaher Corporation. In 2014, Kerr acquired DUX Dental and Vettec Inc. In 2015, Total Care, Axis SybronEndo and Kerr reorganized into a unilateral organization: Kerr Dental.

=== KaVo ===
KaVo was established in 1909 in Berlin, Germany by Alois Kaltenbach as KaVo Dental GmbH. By 1919, Richard Voigt joined the Kavo and the number of the employees expanded to 300 by 1939. In 1946, the headquarters were moved from Potsdam to the Upper Swabian town of Biberach an der Riss. In 1959, the company opened a dental technology factory in Leutkirch. In 2004, it was purchased by Danaher Corporation. In the same year, KaVo acquired Gendex. In 2005, KaVo acquired Pelton & Crane, a dental operatory equipment manufacturer with a 100-year history in North America, and joined the KaVo Kerr family along with DEXIS. In 2007, i-CAT was acquired by Kavo, formerly Soredex imaging brands in 2009. In 2012, Aribex, which is best known for the NOMAD handheld and portable X-ray systems, was acquired by KaVo Dental Group.

In September 2021, Envista announced that KaVo will be sold to Planmeca for $455 million.

== See also ==
- PaloDEx
- de:KaVo Dental (German)
