= Snacky =

Finnish fast food chain

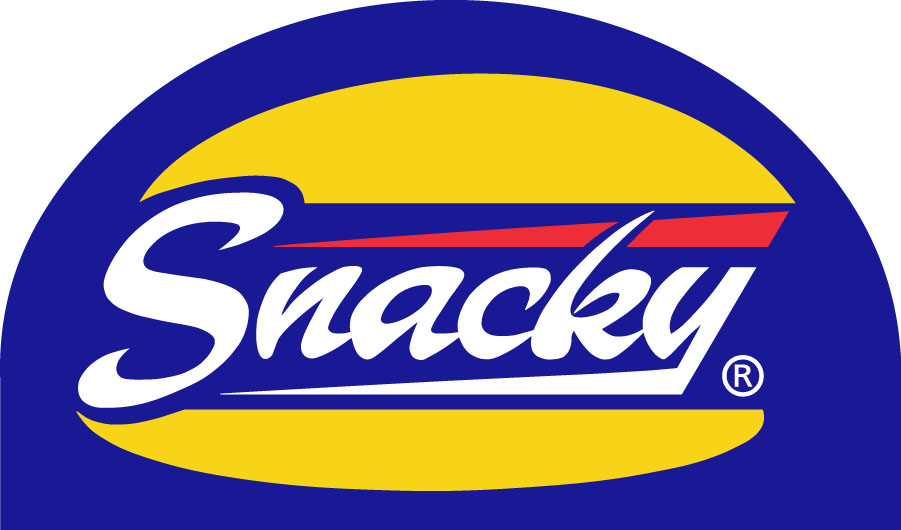
Snacky's logo

Snacky is a small Finnish fast food chain operating in the Helsinki capital area. Founded in 1980, the chain was operating until 1995, and then again under a new owner from 2007 to 2015. As the chain went bankrupt, its owner was sentenced to jail for severe financial crimes. In 2021 Snacky returned again, now as a virtual restaurant, where Snacky products can be bought through Foodora and Wolt. However, Snacky does not have its own restaurant premises.

== History ==
The Snacky hamburger restaurant chain was first operational from 1980 to 1995. The first Snacky restaurant was founded in Itäkeskus, Helsinki in 1980. The restaurant was founded by the Hämeenheimo family. The chain had a total of 14 double-laned automobile grill restaurants. They were located in Helsinki, Espoo, Vantaa, Kerava, Hämeenlinna, Tampere and Oulu. One of Snacky's product innovations was the rye hamburger.

The chain disappeared from the market in 1995, when Carrols bought it out. In January 2007 the Snacky brand was bought by Burger Bakers Oy.

The chain operated as franchising until 2015. Under the new concept, there were seven Snacky restaurants, of which four were located in Helsinki, two in Vantaa and one in Espoo.

The Snacky products included "Poliisi" ("Policeman"), a double-layered hamburger with a fried egg, "Taksi" ("Taxi") with pineapple, "Pressa" ("President) with bacon and a fried egg and "Heavy Monster", a gigantic layered burger. Snacky was known for its vivid marketing, extravagant compared to its business in its final years, including professional wrestling, bikini-clad car washers, drive-in movies, girl pin-up calendars and free condoms. The advertising reached from the Helsinki capital area to Hua Hin, Thailand with its open bed taxis. In late 2015 over half of Snacky's revenue of a couple of million euro was spent on marketing, including half a dozen flashy advertising films.

On 21 December 2015 Snacky's owner Effect Investment Oy went bankrupt. The chain ceased activities on 18 March 2016, when no new owner for it was found. The last Snacky restaurant in Pihlajisto, Helsinki closed down in late August 2016. It operated under franchising, so it stayed open until its rental contract ended.

=== Financial crimes ===
Snacky's last owner and former CEO Jukka Pekka Edvard Nieminen was sentenced to five and a half years in prison for severe financial crimes by the district court in March 2017. Nieminen had withdrawn 1.1 million euro from the accounts of Effect Investment Oy, Snacky's backup company. He had also acquired almost 600,000 euro of cash funds from Snacky restaurants. Hardly any accounting had been done and the chain's bills had not been paid, leading to its bankruptcy. Nieminen was also convicted of fraud regarding false claims of the expansion of the Snacky chain. The district court sentenced Nieminen to pay almost 3 million euro.

The court of appeal lowered the sentence to four and a half years in prison and also lowered the monetary expenses a bit. According to the prosecutor, Nieminen had planned to move to Australia after acquiring the money. There Nieminen had already been working for a couple of years as a restaurant owner during the turn of the millennium.
