= Kyöstilä =

Kyöstilä is a Finnish surname.

Notable people with the surname include:

- Heikki Kyöstilä (born 1946), Finnish billionaire, and the founder, owner and president of dental equipment maker Planmeca
- Lauri Kyöstilä (1896–1984), Finnish diver who competed in the 1920 and 1924 Summer Olympics in the platform event
