= Salmela =

Salmela is a Finnish surname.

== Geographical distribution ==
As of 2014, 81.1% of all known bearers of the surname Salmela were residents of Finland (frequency 1:1,061), 9.0% of the United States (1:628,263), 4.4% of Sweden (1:35,293), 2.4% of Estonia (1:8,638) and 1.2% of Australia (1:316,985).

In Finland, the frequency of the surname was higher than national average (1:1,061) in the following regions:

1. Central Ostrobothnia (1:289)
2. Lapland (1:290)
3. North Ostrobothnia (1:466)
4. Central Finland (1:839)
5. Pirkanmaa (1:1,035)

== People ==
- Anssi Salmela (born 1984), Finnish ice hockey defenceman
- Heikki Salmela (born 1946), Finnish businessman
- Hugo Salmela (1884–1918), Red Guard military leader
- Jukka Salmela (born 1958), Finnish speedskater
- Martta Salmela-Järvinen (1892–1987), Finnish politician and author
- Minna Salmela (born 1971), Finnish swimmer
- Saku Salmela (born 1990), Finnish ice hockey defenceman

== See also ==
- Art Centre Salmela in Finland
