= Planmed =

Finnish medical technology company

Planmed Oy
- Type: Privately held company
- Industry: X-Ray Apparatus & Tubes & Related Irradiation Apparatus
- Founded: 1988; 38 years ago in Helsinki, Finland
- Headquarters: Helsinki, Finland
- Area served: Worldwide
- Key people: Jan Moed (CEO)
- Parent: Planmeca

Planmed Oy is a Finnish company founded in 1988 that designs and manufactures imaging systems and accessories for mammography and orthopaedic imaging. The company's headquarters are located in Helsinki, Finland. They export over 98% of their production to around 70 other countries worldwide.

The company has a subsidiary in the United States and a sales office in the Netherlands.

Planmed Oy is part of the Finnish Planmeca Group.

== History ==
Prototypes of the company's orthopaedic CBCT scanner were in use at Finnish hospitals from mid-2010, and the design was granted European CE certification for clinical diagnostic use shortly before 2013. The scanner subsequently entered the American market, and an installation at a hospital in the United States dating from February 2013 has been described in the radiological literature.

In October 2020 the United States Food and Drug Administration (FDA) cleared two of the company's digital mammography units through the 510(k) pathway. A further clearance followed on 26 September 2025 for a full-body CBCT scanner intended for orthopaedic use.

== Products ==
=== Mammography ===
The Clarity range comprises full-field digital mammography units. The Clarity 2D and Clarity S models are regulated in the United States as class II devices under 21 CFR 892.1715 and are indicated for breast cancer screening and diagnosis. The range also includes a digital breast tomosynthesis configuration marketed as Clarity 3D.

=== Orthopaedic imaging ===
The Verity extremity scanner is a mobile CBCT unit for orthopaedic imaging whose technology derives from established dental cone-beam scanners. The unit weighs 350 kg, measures 185 × 76 × 160 cm, runs from an ordinary mains socket and requires no external cooling, which allows it to be sited alongside conventional equipment in a standard radiography room. Its gantry can be tilted to a horizontal orientation and lowered close to floor level, making examinations of the knee, ankle and foot possible while the patient is standing. During a scan, the source traverses an incomplete orbit of 210 degrees, acquiring 300 projection images in roughly 18 seconds at an isotropic resolution of 0.2 mm or, in a low-dose mode, 0.4 mm. Reduced exposure settings for children are supplied as a factory preset.

Independent assessments of the scanner's radiation dose have not been uniform. A retrospective review of paediatric foot and ankle examinations recorded mean effective doses roughly 43 per cent below those of comparable multidetector CT studies, whereas phantom measurements at a university hospital in Graz found surface doses lower than those of a routine multidetector protocol but comparable once the two machines were matched for dose index, and the authors noted more pronounced beam-hardening artefacts in the cone-beam images.

The XFI scanner extends the technique to the whole body and can image patients standing, seated or supine. According to the manufacturer, it is the only full-body CT system capable of all three positions. The gantry has an aperture of 85 cm, rotates through 360 degrees and reconstructs volumes at a voxel size of 75 µm. Tube voltage is adjustable between 80 and 140 kVp and the tube current–time product between 10 and 800 mAs, while the field of view ranges from 50 × 50 mm to 442 × 235 mm. A motion-correction algorithm tracks patient movement during acquisition and compensates for it in the reconstruction. A cadaveric study of the middle ear reported that the device resolved fine ossicular structures and produced three-dimensional reconstructions at moderate effective doses, and suggested it may suit pre-operative planning.

== Recognition ==
In January 2017 Planmed received one of five Fennia Prize Winner awards, worth €5,000 each, for the Clarity mammography unit.
