= Two Pesos =

Restaurant information
- Established: 1982
- Closed: 1993
- Location: Houston, Texas, U.S.

Two Pesos was a Tex-Mex restaurant chain in the U.S. state of Texas that opened in 1982 in Houston. It was similar to Taco Cabana, but Two Pesos never opened in Taco Cabana's home market of San Antonio. The Two Pesos chain was sold to Taco Cabana in 1993 after losing a drawn-out trade dress suit that appeared before the United States Supreme Court.

== History ==
Two Pesos was started in 1985 by Houston restaurateur Marno McDermot, who had been in negotiations with Taco Cabana's management to take the patio-restaurant chain nationwide. When Taco Cabana's founding Stehling brothers rejected his advances, McDermot decided to open up his own chain of similarly themed patio-dining Tex-Mex restaurants under the Two Pesos name. Two Pesos Inc. was subsequently acquired by Ghulam Mohammed "Bombay" Bombaywala, which at the time was incurring annual losses of $2.7 million, and "Mr. Bombay", as he was commonly known, became the company's chairperson and president. Two Pesos had 27 locations as of 1999. When Taco Cabana entered the Houston market, they sued Two Pesos for stealing their business concepts and "trade dress." After many appeals, the case went to the Supreme Court, which in 1992 ruled in Two Pesos, Inc. v. Taco Cabana, Inc. in favor of Taco Cabana. As a result of the ruling, in 1993, Bombaywala sold Two Pesos, by then profitable, for $30 million to Taco Cabana rather than making the changes required by the judgment.
