= Felix Stehling =

American businessman and restaurateur

- Born: April 2, 1927; Fredericksburg, Texas
- Died: December 10, 2012 (aged 85)
- Education: St. Mary's University
- Occupations: Restaurateur, investor

Felix Louis Stehling, Jr. (April 2, 1927 – December 10, 2012) was an American businessman and restaurateur. Stehling and his brother Mike Stehling co-founded Taco Cabana, a fast food restaurant chain specializing in Tex-Mex cuisine, in 1978. Stehling is credited as the inventor of the beanburger, a now common dish in the San Antonio area, consisting of refried beans, Fritos and Cheez Whiz.

== Early life and education ==
Stehling was born in Fredericksburg, Texas, the second oldest of his family's eleven children. His parents were German Catholics who operated a men's clothing store. He graduated from St. Mary's University in San Antonio.

== Career ==
=== First restaurants and beanburger ===
Stehling initially worked for an insurance company, but left that industry after just two years. He then owned and operated a series of restaurants and nightclubs in San Antonio, including the Crystal Pistol and the Bombay Bicycle Club. In 1952, he signed a three-year lease to rent a small, shack-like restaurant on Austin Highway from Frank Sills, the owner of the first Sills' Snack Shack. It was here that Stehling invented and first offered the beanburger. Stehling is credited as the inventor of the beanburger, a now common dish in the San Antonio area, consisting of refried beans, Fritos and Cheez Whiz. Frank Sills later sold Stehling's beanburger creation at his own restaurants once Stehling's lease on the building expired.

=== Taco Cabana ===
In 1978, Stehling and his brother, Mike, opened the first Taco Cabana in San Antonio at the intersection of Hildebrand and San Pedro streets at the site of a former Dairy Queen, dubbing the restaurant "the original Mexican patio café". Felix Stehling's wife, Billie Jo Stehling, created the décor and overall interior look for the restaurant chain. Margie Lopez Abonce was hired to prepare the food and menu. They made it a 24-hour restaurant because Felix Stehling didn't want to spend an hour every night working with patio furniture. Mike Stehling later left the company in 1986. Felix Stehling kept five restaurants and the name, while Mike Stehling kept four outlets and renamed them TaCasita.

As of 1989, Stehling remained president of the company. Stehling made Taco Cabana a public company when the chain reached fifty stores, including locations in Austin and Houston. However, in 1994 Taco Cabana's board of directors ousted Stehling from the company.

=== Spurs and charity ===
Stehling was once a partial owner of the San Antonio Spurs. Outside of Texas, Stehling held real estate investments in Colorado.

He founded a charity which provided funding for the Special Olympics of Texas, his alma mater, St. Mary's University, and other charitable groups.

== Personal life ==
He married Billie Jo Stehling in 1960. He had two stepsons. As he grew older, he continued to pick up meals from Taco Cabana for him and his wife. Billie Jo died on May 6, 2011, at the age of 86. Stehling, who suffered from dementia during his later years, died on December 10, 2012, at the age of 85.
