= Heartland Food Corporation =

One of the largest franchises of Burger King

Heartland Food Corp.
- Industry: Food service
- Founder: Al Cabrera
- Headquarters: Downers Grove, Illinois, U.S
- Area served: Midwestern United States, Canada
- Key people: Christopher J. Ondrula; President and Chief Executive Officer; Joel Aaseby; Chief Financial Officer; Pam Smith, Vice President of Operations; John Schank, Vice President of Operations

Heartland Foods is one of the largest franchises of Burger King. The Downers Grove, Illinois-based company owns and operates over 225 restaurants in six US States.

== History ==
By 2001 and nearly eighteen years of stagnant growth, many of Burger King's franchises were in some sort of financial distress. The lack of growth severely impacted BKC's largest franchise, the nearly 400 store AmeriKing; by 2001 the company, which until this point had been struggling under a nearly $300 million debt load and shedding stores across the US, was forced to enter Chapter 11 bankruptcy.

While several individual BK franchisees also took advantage of the AmeriKing failure and the resulting sale of its assets, Miami-based franchisee Al Cabrera and cofounder Joseph DaGrosa purchased the largest chunk of stores, 130 locations primarily in Chicago and the Upper Midwest, from the failed company for a bargain basement price of $16 million, or approximately 88% of their original value. Taking these stores, he and his partners created a new company called Core Value Partners to renovate and update the locations which had deteriorated during Ameriking's decline. During this time, the company was renamed Heartland Foods and it purchased 120 additional stores from other financially distressed owners and completely revamped them as well. The resulting purchases made Mr. Cabrerra Burger King's largest minority franchisee and Heartland one of BKC's top franchisee groups. By 2006, the company was valued at over $150 million, and was sold to New York-based GSO Capital Partners.

In 2012, Heartland acquired 121 Burger King locations from Burger King Corporation, including 27 in Nashville, Tennessee.

In 2014, Heartland sold 64 Burger King locations to Carrols Restaurant Group, including 27 locations in Nashville, Tennessee, 11 in Springfield, Illinois and 22 in Indiana.
