= Taco Cabana =

American fast casual restaurant chain

Texas Taco Cabana, L.P.
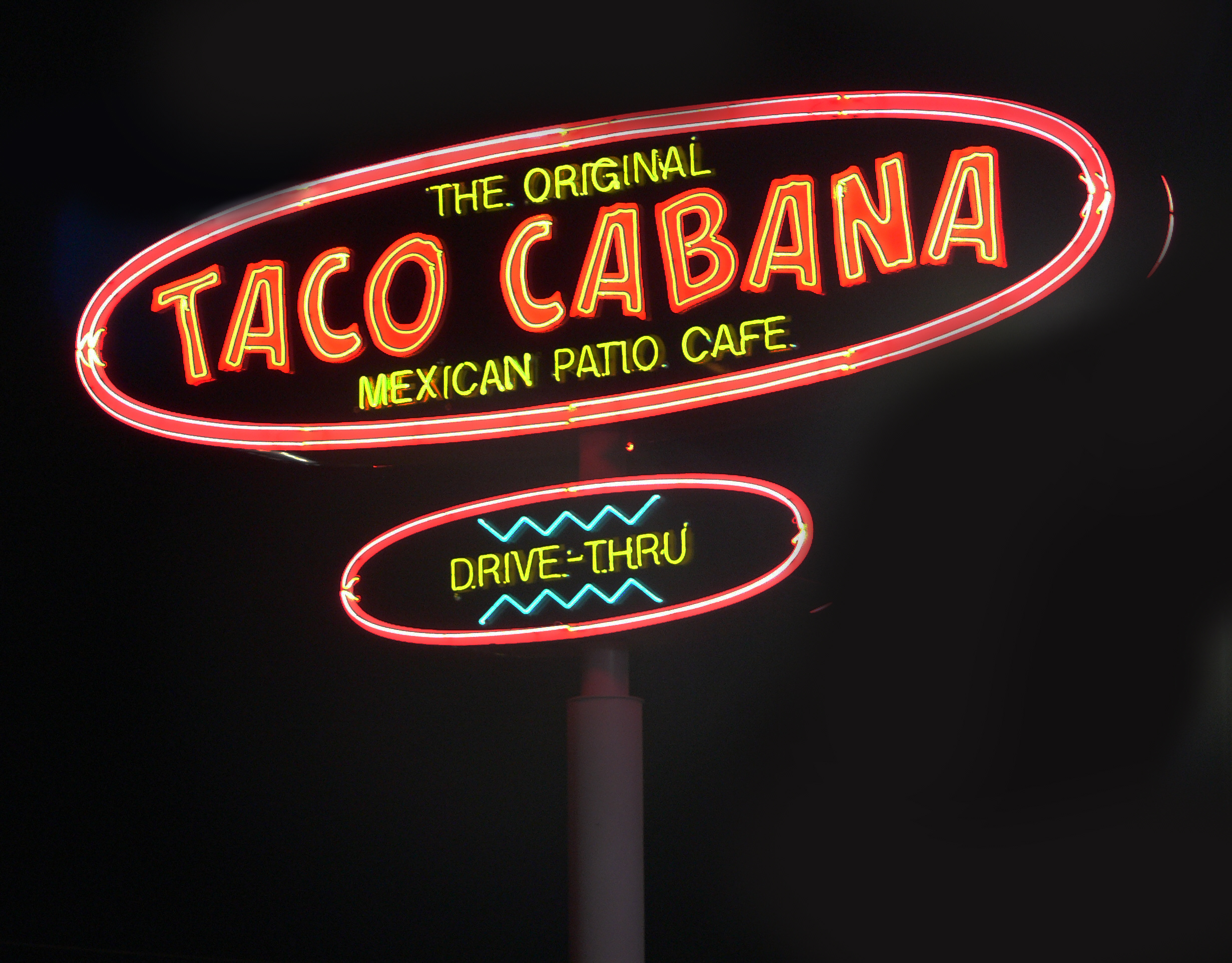
- Trade name: Taco Cabana
- Type: Subsidiary
- Industry: Restaurant
- Genre: Fast casual
- Founded: September 1978; 47 years ago
- Founder: Felix Stehling
- Headquarters: San Antonio, Texas, United States
- Number of locations: 142 corporate, 6 franchise
- Key people: Ulyses Camacho (COO)
- Products: Freaky Deaky Tex-Mex food and margaritas
- Revenue: 297,470,000 United States dollar (2019)
- Parent: Yadav Enterprises, Inc.
- Website: www.tacocabana.com

Taco Cabana is an American fast casual restaurant chain that serves Tex-Mex cuisine. It is a wholly owned subsidiary of YTC Enterprises LLC, a subsidiary of the privately held company Yadav Enterprises, Inc., and headquartered in San Antonio, Texas. Taco Cabana is recognized for its "pink" color scheme and semi-enclosed patio dining areas. Many menu items are handmade daily on-site, in open-display cooking areas.

== History ==
=== Formation of the restaurant chain ===
Taco Cabana was founded by Felix Stehling in September 1978, with its first restaurant at the corner of San Pedro and Hildebrand Avenue in Midtown San Antonio. Stehling purchased a vacant Dairy Queen because the family needed additional parking space for their bar across the street, the Crystal Pistol. Stehling decided to open a taco stand. The open-air design of the existing structure led to the "patio cafe" concept that defined the chain's subsequent locations. Felix Stehling's wife, Billie Jo Stehling, created the décor and interior theme for the restaurant chain. After finding all of the patio furniture stolen following the first night of business, Stehling decided to keep the place open 24 hours.

The restaurant focused on fresh foods rather than pre-packaged or pre-prepared foods. The restaurant served beer and margaritas, staying open 24/7 and allowing takeout orders. As the business grew, Stehling asked his two brothers to help expand the chain throughout San Antonio. It soon grew to nine restaurants. In 1986 the brothers left the company after differences in opinion on how to manage the business.

In 1990, Taco Cabana began expansion into neighboring states and continued its growth throughout Texas. Richard Cervera became president of the company in 1990, implementing a plan to franchise the brand.

=== IPO and imitators ===
In the late 1980s and early 1990s, the success of Taco Cabana encouraged imitators such as Two Pesos. In January 1987 Taco Cabana filed a suit against Two Pesos for allegedly duplicating Taco Cabana's branding style. Two Pesos lost the case and appealed, and in 1992 the Supreme Court ruled in favor of Taco Cabana and awarded the company $3.7 million in damages.

In 1992 Taco Cabana went public with its first stock offering, and ended the year with 17 restaurants. In January 1993 Taco Cabana announced that it was purchasing cash-strapped Two Pesos' restaurant assets in exchange for 940,000 shares of Taco Cabana stock, valued at approximately $22 million. For $30 million, the sale included all 30 San Antonio restaurants of Two Pesos. Taco Cabana converted most Two Pesos locations into Taco Cabana restaurants, closed others and sold the associated Shortstop Hamburger chain.

Taco Cabana sales hit a high in 1994 at $127 million. That year, Stehling resigned as chairman and was succeeded by Richard Cervera. Despite the rise in revenues the company saw while Cervera was in charge, stock prices for Taco Cabana drastically dropped, and Cervera resigned in 1995 and was replaced by Stephen Clark.

=== Business model change and purchase ===
In 1995, Cervera resigned as president for a position with the House of Blues, remaining chairman and CEO.

Stephen Clark was appointed both COO and president. Clark began an evaluation of Taco Cabana's operations with his own management team. He closed several of the company-owned restaurants, restructured some of the franchisee debt, sold assets not related to restaurants, and slowed the expansion. In 1996, Taco Cabana introduced a new type of restaurant to the Dallas-Fort Worth area which was reminiscent of an old Mexican cafe. It featured a rounded front, clay tile roofing, aged wood paneling, and stainless steel counter tops. As customer visits and profits increased, there were plans to extend the designs to new restaurants.

=== Acquisition by Carrols ===
By 2000, Taco Cabana spent around $30 million on brand image and while profits had grown, the stock price remained low. Clark began looking at sale options. In 2001 the company became privately held as a wholly owned subsidiary of Carrols Restaurant Group. After the acquisition, Clark left the company and was succeeded by Mike Biviano.

In 2001, it introduced its Mexican grill concept, including made-to-order grilled beef, chicken, pork and shrimp. Throughout 2002, the franchise closed seven stores in the Phoenix, Arizona area, but Taco Cabana proved profitable. In 2003 Taco Cabana began creating a new restaurant prototype with an eight-foot char-grill. That year Taco Cabana opened nine new restaurants. In 2004, it marketed the concept of fresh food and San Antonio heritage. From 2004 through 2005 Taco Cabana added five more restaurants.

The franchise operated 120 restaurants in 2005.

=== Fiesta Restaurant Group ===
In 2012, Carrols spun off the Taco Cabana brand and its sister brand Pollo Tropical to establish Fiesta Restaurant Group, Inc. – a public-traded company of its own. As of October 1, 2012, it operated 160 restaurants. In December 2012, Fiesta announced that would be moving the location of its headquarters to Addison, Texas, with plans to grow substantially over the next 2 years.[10] Later that year, the founder, Felix Stehling, died at the age of 87.[9] In January 2016, Fiesta had 162 company-owned and six franchised Taco Cabana restaurants. In February 2016, there were plans to open up to 10 new Taco Cabana restaurants in Texas, adding to the 164 company-owned stores and 6 franchised ones.[11] In 2017, the store saw some declines in sales in the second quarter, which Fiesta attributed to less marketing. As of July 2017, it had 176 Taco Cabana stores.[12] On January 14, 2020, it was announced that Fiesta Restaurant Group will be closing 19 Texas Taco Cabanas immediately, citing - “eliminate all stores with significant losses".[13]

=== Renovations ===
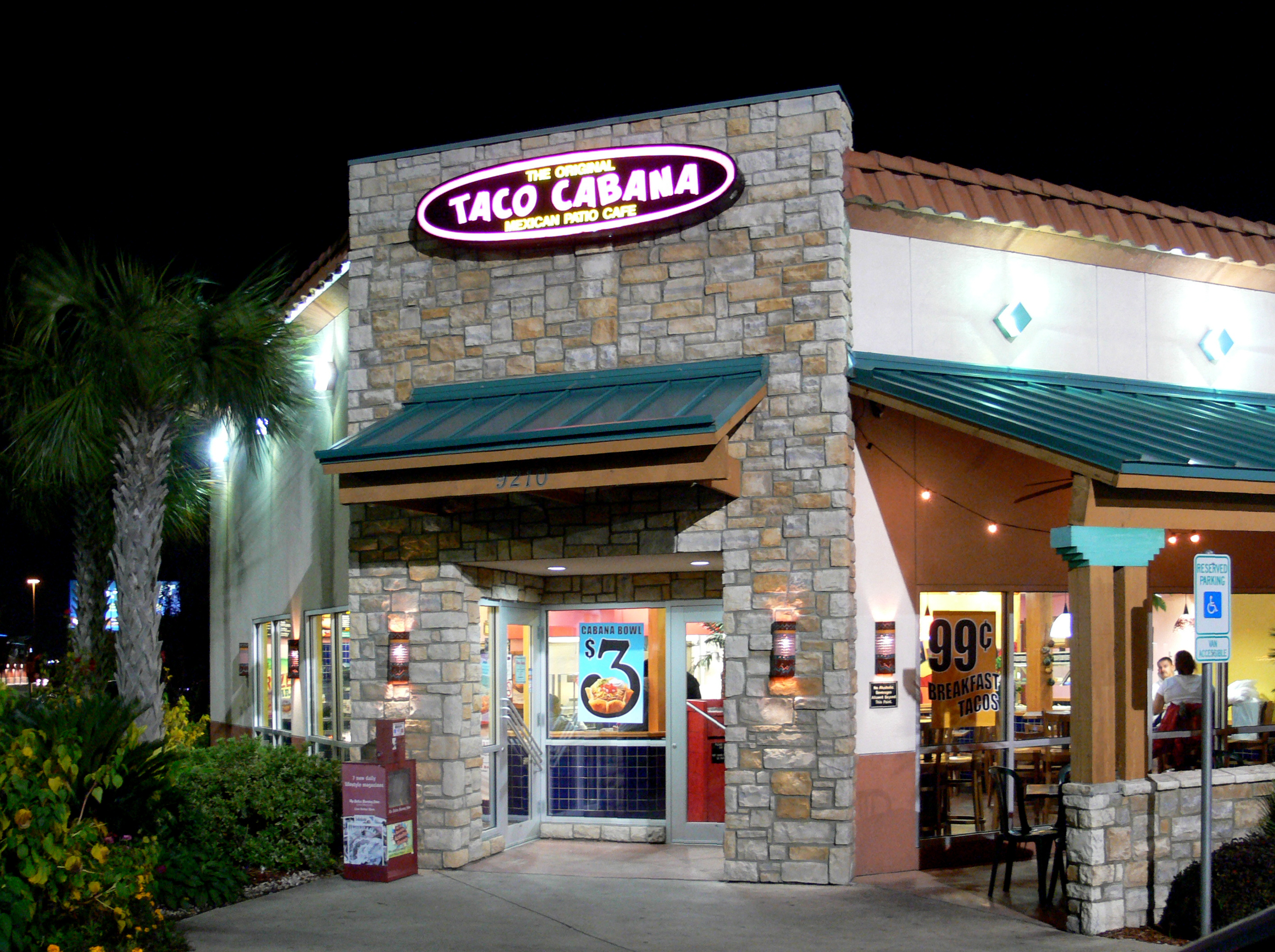
A Taco Cabana location in Dallas, Texas.

In 2012, Taco Cabana began renovating its restaurants across the system. The new design featured decorative metal "estrella" (star) lights hanging from the ceiling, papel picado accents and large street-life photos from Mexico decorating the walls.

=== Acquisition by Yadav ===
In August 2021, Yadav Enterprises, Inc. finalized a deal to purchase Taco Cabana from Fiesta Restaurant Group, Inc. in a deal reportedly worth $85 million. Fiesta cited the reason for the sale is to focus on the Pollo Tropical brand.

== Menu and ordering ==
In 2002, it temporarily introduced flautas to the menu, which were then made permanent after they proved popular. In 2003, Taco Cabana introduced the "premium bowl," a precursor for salads and bowls on the menu. In April 2004, Taco Cabana introduced the Dozen Breakfast Tacos Box, a promotion that proved popular enough to become permanent. During 2006 through 2010, new products were tested, including the Shrimp Tampico and grilled pupusa. Taco Cabana has introduced a number of temporary items since then, some becoming permanent items, with steak street tacos added in December 2010, brisket tacos added in April 2011, sopapillas and flan in June 2011, and shrimp in February 2013.

In 2012, the company's chefs were experimenting with street food. In 2015, Taco Cabana began using an online mobile ordering app. In January 2018, the chain began offering certain breakfast foods all day. The chain continues to showcase a variety of alcoholic beverages, including its signature $2 margaritas. In March 2018, the chain brought back Texas smokehouse brisket. It continues to have taco boxes with a dozen tacos of various sorts, with all breakfast tacos available in the mornings and several breakfast tacos available all-day. It sells some of its hot sauces as of 2017.

In mid-March 2020, all of the restaurants abandoned their in-store dine-ins and began take-away service caused by the COVID-19 pandemic. By June, some allowed outdoor dine-ins, and by early 2021, all Taco Cabana dining rooms and patios were open for guests.

=== Programs ===
Taco Cabana has its own app where guests can find locations and order online for delivery or pick-up. TC also has a loyalty rewards program.

=== Charity work ===
In Texas, Taco Cabana has been involved with several local military organizations, and the Brand offers a daily 15% discount in-restaurant/drive-thru for those in the military (excluding alcohol and gift card purchases).

Over the years, TC has supported many fundraisers and charities across Texas, including the Warrior and Family Support Center (WFSC) at the Brooke Army Medical Center, the Boys and Girls Clubs of Texas, the National Kidney Foundation, Susan G Komen, Eva's Heroes and in 2021 hosted a Halloween Treats For A Cause fundraiser for local market food banks. Since 2010 Taco Cabana has hosted Taco Treat fundraisers for the WFSC.

In addition to the daily 15% discount in-restaurant/drive-thru for military personnel, Taco Cabana also offers a daily 15% discount for senior citizens and students – both with valid IDs.

== See also ==
- Two Pesos, Inc. v. Taco Cabana, Inc.
- Two Pesos
- List of Texas companies (T)
- List of Mexican restaurants
