= PaloDEx =

Finnish dental radiography equipment company

PaloDEx Group is a Finnish company making equipment for dental radiography. Since 2009, the company is owned by the American Envista Holdings Corporation which is a spinn-off company from Danaher Corporation since December 2019.

The company was started in 1964 as Palomex Oy to manufacture the Orthopantomograph®, a device for making panoramic radiographs invented by Finnish professor Yrjö Paatero. The device made possible to take a panoramic X-ray dental image in a single exposure.

Palomex Oy was acquired by the Finnish optical and medical equipment company Instrumentarium in 1977. Some of the company's operations formed a new company Soredex Oy, which was merged with the Orion Group in 1981. Palomex was renamed as Instrumentarium Imaging in 1988. In 2001, Instrumentarium acquired Soredex and now possessed two strong brands in dental imaging.

GE Healthcare acquired Instrumentarium in 2003. Two years later, GE sold its dental imaging operations which were formed into a separate company, PaloDEx Group Oy. In 2009, the company was acquired by Danaher Corporation. The company's product families now include KaVo ORTHOPANTOMOGRAPH™, Instrumentarium Dental and Soredex.
