= Carrols (Finland) =

Finnish fast food restaurant chain

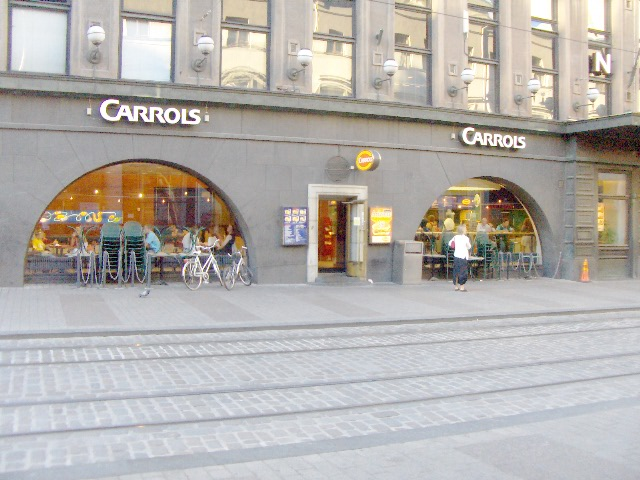
Carrols in Helsinki, 2006

Carrols was a chain of fast-food restaurants in various cities in Finland. Established in 1975, the chain was sold to the Burger-In Group in 2002, the parent company of Hesburger. Its remaining restaurants were gradually converted to the Hesburger brand, with the rebranding completed in 2012.

== History ==
The company originally came to Finland in 1975 as a franchise of an international chain named Carrols Corporation. However, it was eventually completely bought by the Finnish company Tuko (after the company gave up the use of its original restaurant brand and concept) which in turn was acquired by the Finnish chain Kesko becoming a completely Finnish-owned company. In the process it was renamed from Carrol's to Carrols, losing the apostrophe. Thus, the original Carrols brand would survive exclusively in Finland.

The most famous hamburger in Carrols was the Club Burger, which was similar to the Big Mac in McDonald's. The chain also regularly served limited-time special hamburgers.

In late 1999, there were 65 Carrols restaurants in Finland, with 35 being franchise-run, and 17 opened during the year. Net sales were €36 million, down 7.7% from 1998 because of a transition to franchising. Its hamburger market share was 25%, up from 19% in 1997.

The chain was eventually bought out in 2002 by another Finnish fast-food chain, Hesburger, which integrated it to itself almost fully. Almost all Carrols restaurants were converted to Hesburgers. This event caused a minor upset among the residents of Helsinki, since Hesburger is based in a rival city, Turku. Since the acquisition by Hesburger, only a few of the most famous Carrols restaurants remained under their original name, all of them located in the Greater Helsinki region (except one in Janakkala and one in Lahti). Although Hesburger serves the Club Burger in its menu, the limited-time special hamburgers have been discontinued.

In August 2006, new life was breathed into the Carrols brand when a pilot scheme was launched with Pikoil, an operator of Neste branded service stations across Finland. The pilot programme saw new Carrols restaurants opening at Pikoil sites in Imatra and Vantaa. One reason for the Carrols brand being used instead of Hesburger was that Hesburger already operates fast food restaurants under its own name at service stations run by the rival S-Group. Along with the launch of new Carrols restaurants, the Carrols.fi domain no longer pointed to the Hesburger site but instead to a relaunched dedicated Carrols site.

In 2012, Hesburger announced that the brand Carrols would be discontinued, and the last location in Oulunkylä was renamed Hesburger on May 29. Since then the only thing remaining of Carrols has been the Clubburger that periodically has been available in Hesburger for a limited period.

Carrols also operated a chain of outlets in neighbouring Estonia from 1993 to 2001 and in Sweden between 1974 and 1976.

== See also ==
- Hesburger
