= Pollo Tropical =

Restaurant chain

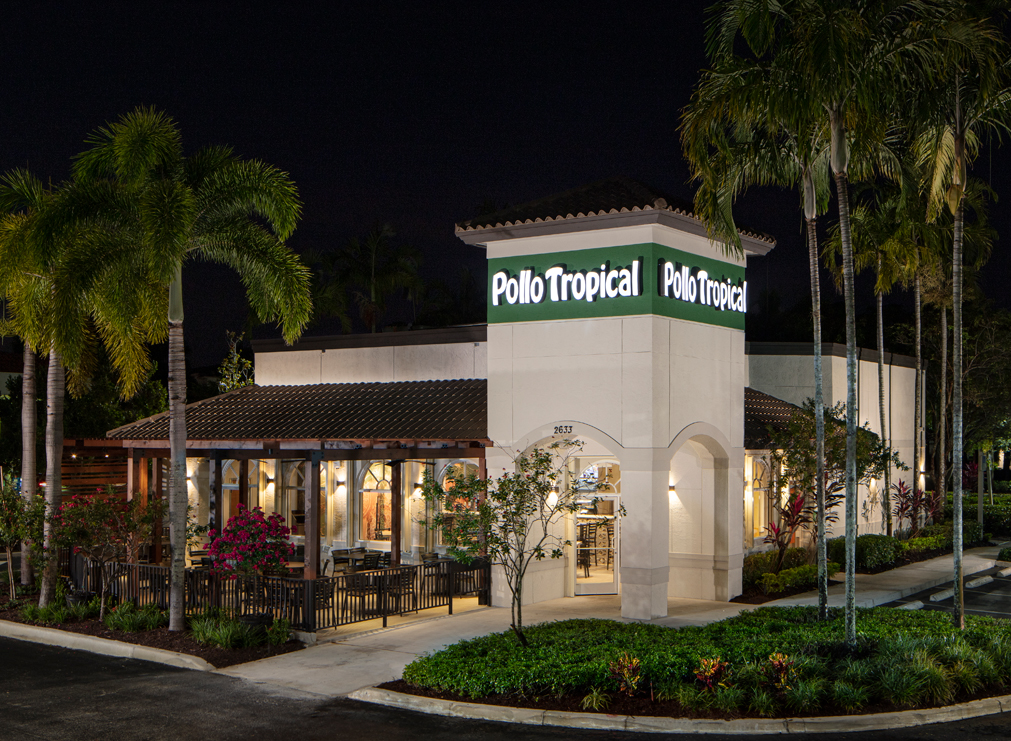
- Pollo Tropical Express Restaurant 2022
- Type: Subsidiary
- Industry: Restaurants
- Genre: Latin American, Caribbean, and Floribbean cuisine
- Founded: 1988; 38 years ago (original) (Miami, Florida)
- Founder: Larry & Stuart Harris
- Headquarters: Miami-Dade County, Florida
- Number of locations: 125 (FL) (2019); 17 (PR) (2022)
- Key people: Dirk Montgomery (CEO)
- Products: Mojo grilled chicken, black beans, yellow rice, yuca and other Latin-style dishes.
- Revenue: 363,473,000 United States dollar (2019)
- Number of employees: 5,600 (2017)
- Parent: Romano's Macaroni Grill
- Website: pollotropical.com

Pollo Tropical (Spanish for "Tropical Chicken") is a South Florida-based restaurant chain and franchise specializing in food inspired by Latin-Caribbean, particularly Cuban, and Floribbean cuisines. Founded in 1988, the chain has its headquarters in Miami-Dade County, Florida. It is best known for marinated and grilled chicken and various sides including black beans and rice, mojo roast pork and more.

== History ==
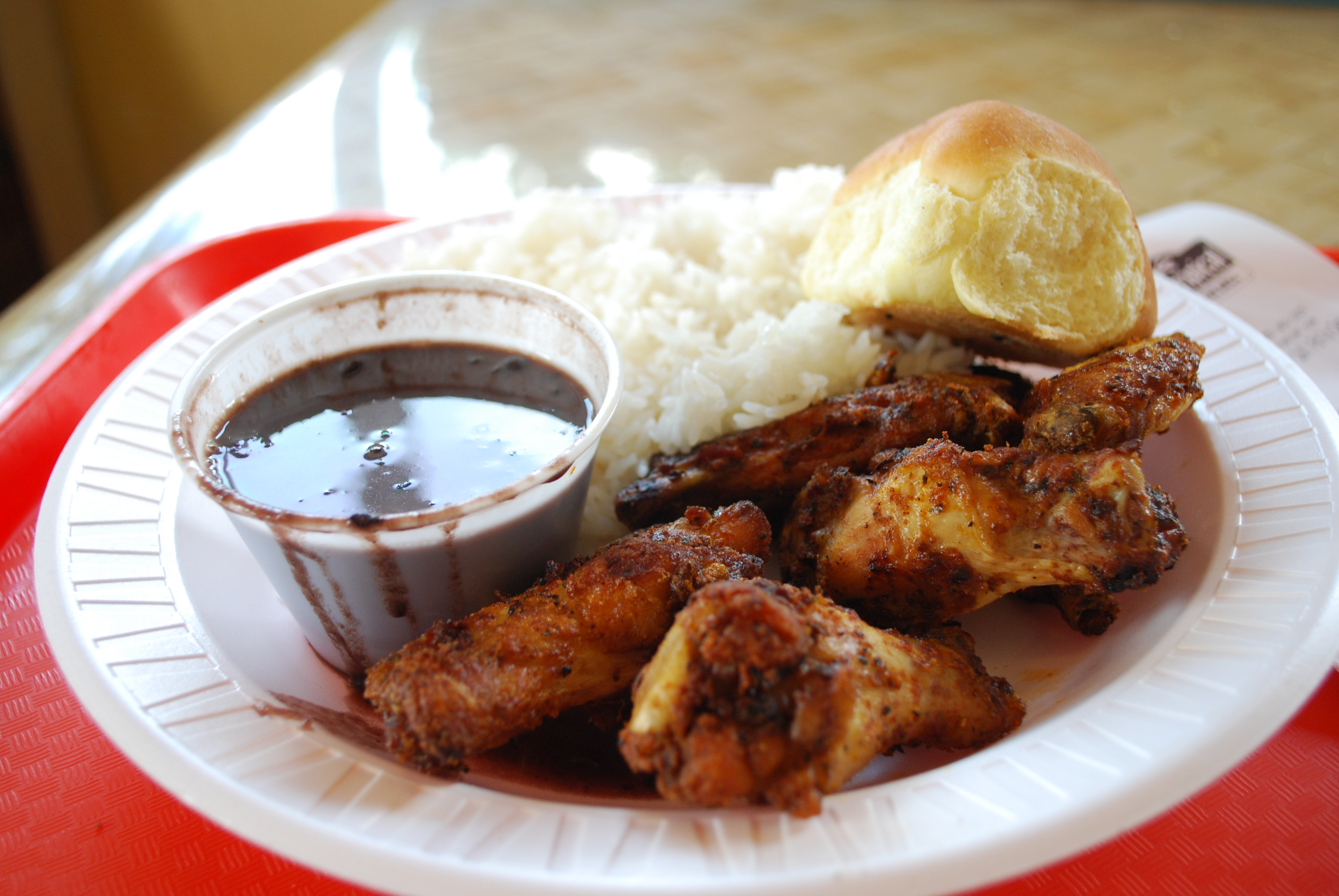
Grilled wings, beans and rice at a Pollo Tropical in Coral Gables, Florida

Pollo Tropical was founded in 1988 by two brothers from Miami, Larry and Stuart Harris. The chicken recipe was the result of Larry's studying cookbooks on Latin American cuisine and conducting experiments on his backyard grill to perfect the marinade. From the outset, the restaurant's strategy was to grill the marinated chicken in the customers' view. There were no prepackaged, precooked menu items and no microwave ovens. By 1993, the company had eight stores and went public. It opened 19 locations in one year including those in New York, Chicago, Atlanta and Tampa. Most of the new locations closed within a year after opening. In 1998, Pollo Tropical was sold to Carrols Restaurant Group, which was and is Burger King's largest United States franchisee. After a period of rapid expansion, there were sixty-nine company-owned locations and numerous franchisees in the Latin American and Caribbean regions.

In 1995, the first Pollo Tropical in Puerto Rico opened in Mayagüez, Puerto Rico.

Pollo Tropical is now a subsidiary of Fiesta Restaurant Group, Inc., which was spun-off from Carrols Restaurant Group in 2012. Fiesta owns, operates and franchises the Pollo Tropical restaurant brand. Its headquarters have been located in Doral since 2017. The company currently owns and operates more than 140 locations throughout Florida, plus five licensed restaurants on college campuses and 32 franchised locations throughout the Caribbean, Central America, South America, and Puerto Rico.

== Food concepts ==
In addition to its fire-grilled chicken, the restaurant provides other regional foods such as Mojo Roast Pork, rice, beans, Cheesy Yuca Bites and Plantains. In 2018 the company began offering fried chicken in addition to their traditional fire-grilled recipe.

== Challenges in the United States ==
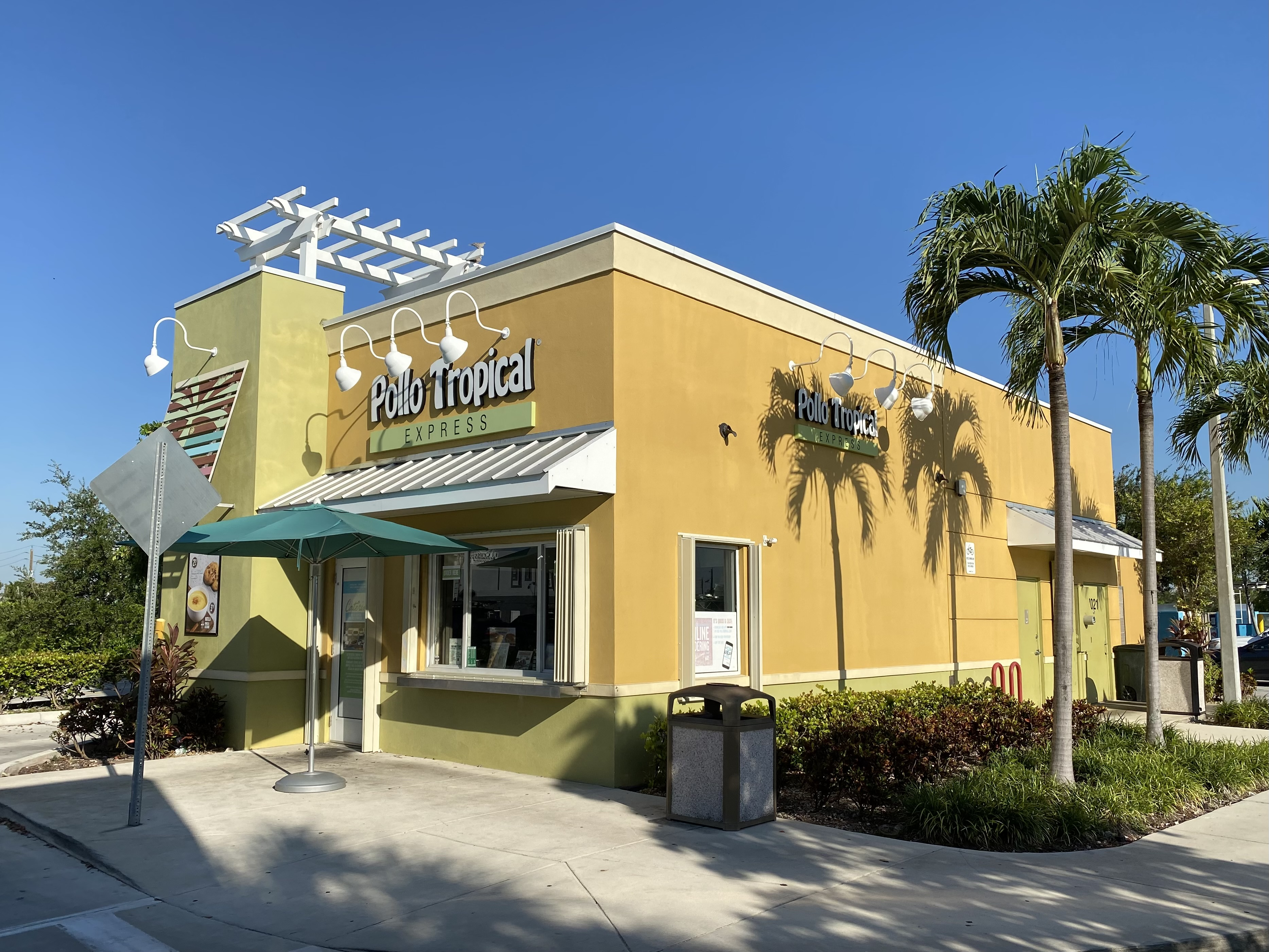
Pollo Tropical Express in Miami, Florida, 2022

After a decline in sales, Fiesta began closing its Texas restaurants, including Pollo Tropical locations in Dallas, Houston, San Antonio, and Austin, in the second quarter of 2017. The Texas restaurants were shuttered as part of closings of 30 stores, including locations in Georgia and Tennessee. This was part of a trend announced earlier in 2017, as the company moved to slow development, having grown "too far, too fast." Instead of trying to open 30 new stores, the company planned to open 8 to 10, all in Florida, which is its core market. While its grilled chicken and other offerings are seen as healthy alternatives to fried chicken, hamburgers and french fries, the style and taste does not immediately draw customers outside Florida, and so requires some explanation to lure new customers in other markets.

== See also ==
- Chicken restaurant
- List of chicken restaurants
