= Hesburger =

Finnish fast food chain

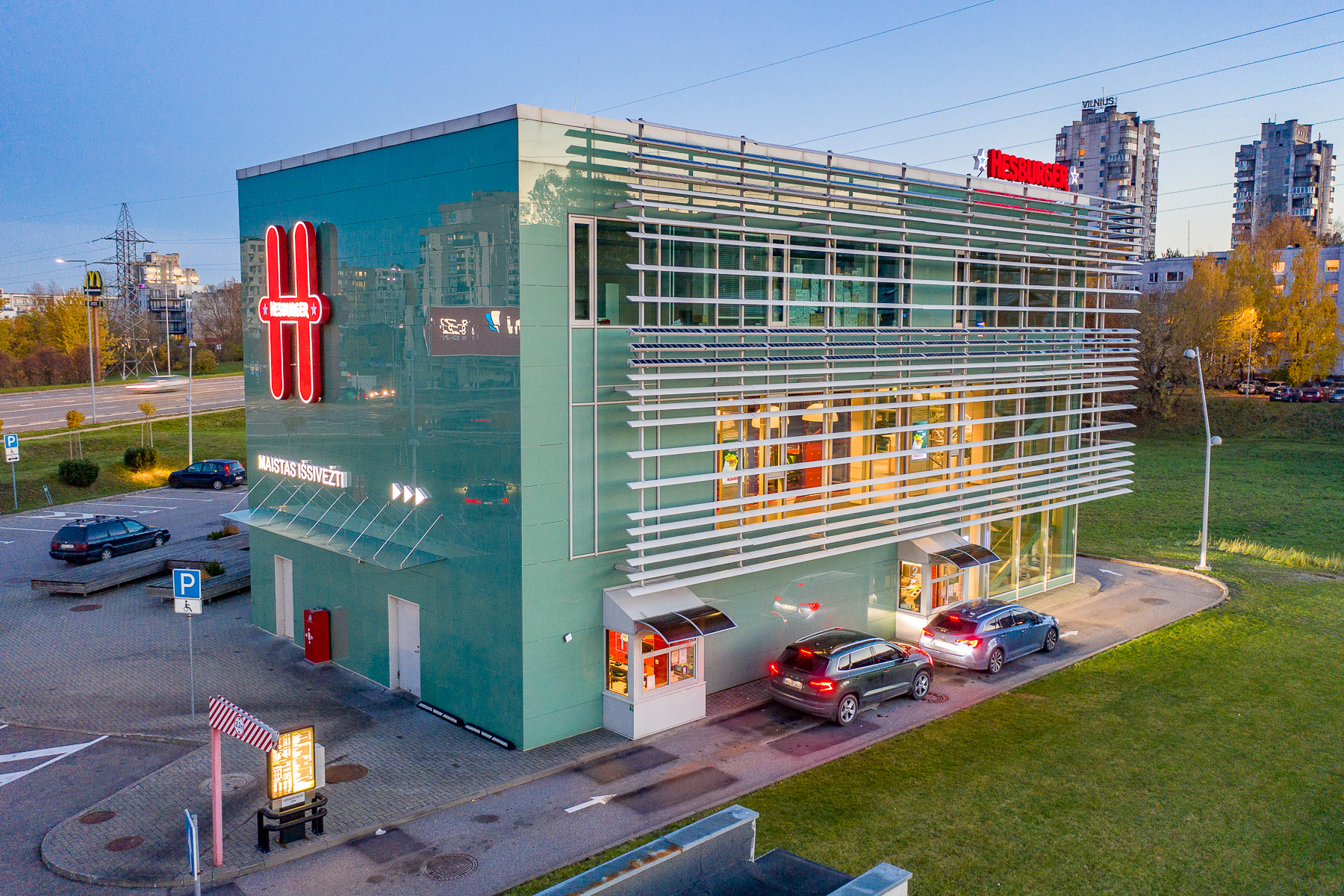
- A Hesburger restaurant in Šeškinė, Vilnius, Lithuania
- Type: Joint-stock company
- Industry: Restaurants
- Founded: 1980; 46 years ago
- Founder: Heikki Salmela
- Headquarters: Turku, Finland
- Number of locations: 473
- Area served: Finland; Estonia; Latvia; Lithuania; Bulgaria; Ukraine; Romania; Poland; Germany; Italy
- Key people: Heikki Salmela (Chairman); Kari Salmela (CEO)
- Products: Fast food (hamburgers • french fries • soft drinks • coffee • milkshakes • salads • desserts)
- Revenue: €569 million (2025)
- Number of employees: 9,500 (2025)
- Website: hesburger.com

Hesburger (colloquially known in Finland as Hese and in Estonia as Hess) is a fast food chain based in Turku, Finland. In 2008 it was the largest hamburger restaurant chain in Finland, Estonia, Latvia and Lithuania, with a market share larger than that of U.S.-based rival McDonald's. It further operates in Bulgaria, Germany, Italy, Poland, Romania, and Ukraine. Hesburger primarily purveys fast foods such as hamburgers, fried potatoes, salads and desserts. The company name is derived from the nickname of the founder, Heikki "Hese" Salmela.

The company also operates Hesecafes, which sell pastries and specialty coffees, and hot dog outlets, also HeseKebab and HeseHotelli. Some restaurants provide car wash services.

== History ==
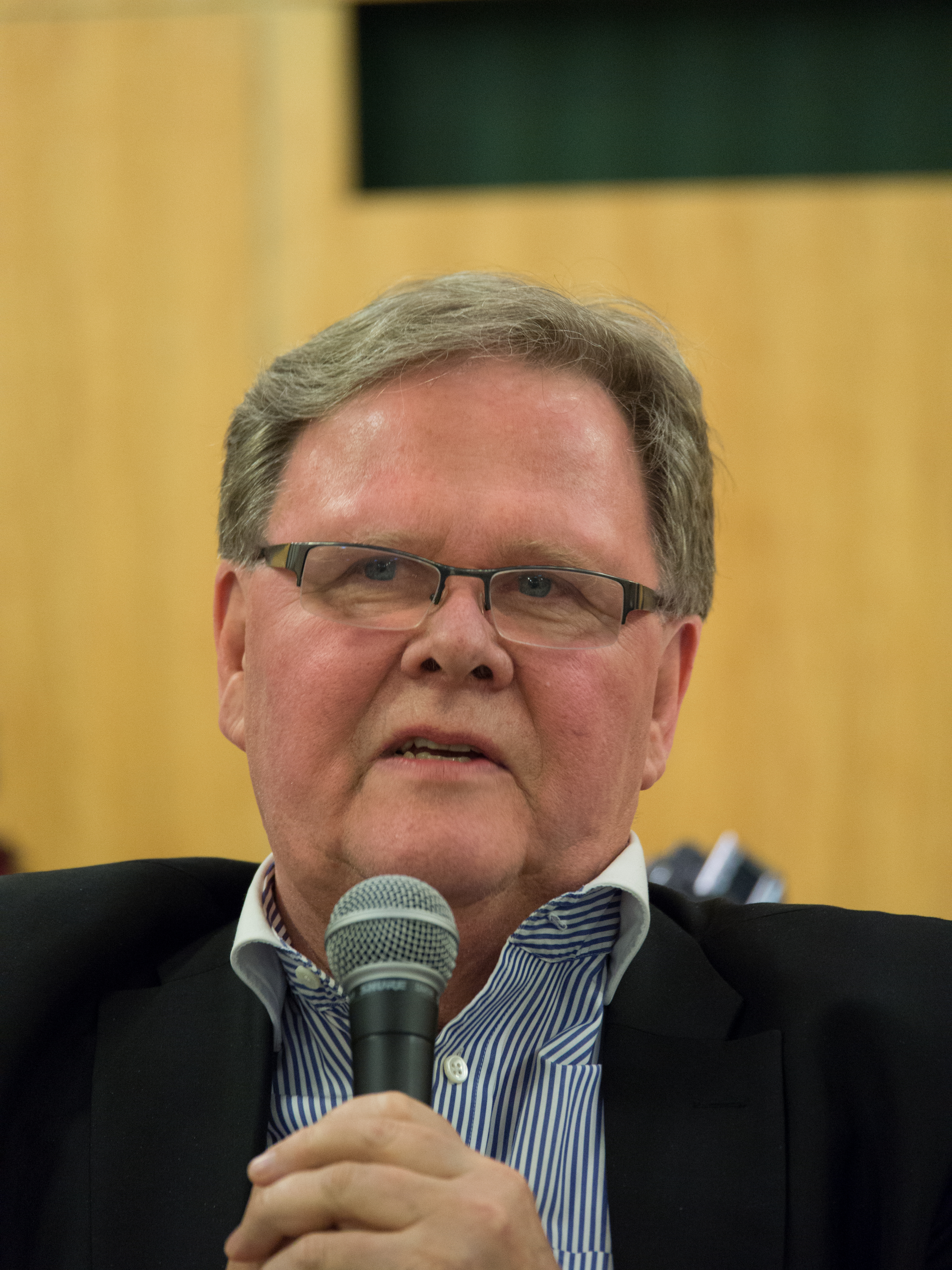
Heikki Salmela, the founder of Hesburger.

The chain's history reaches back to 1966, when 20-year old Heikki Salmela opened a street food kiosk called Kievarin grilli in Naantali. He later opened the first Hesburger in the Hansakortteli shopping centre in 1980 on Kristiinankatu in Turku, which became the first element of the first fast food restaurant chain in Finland. In the 1980s the chain grew fast. Salmela sold the chain and several hotels in 1988 for almost 200 million Finnish markka. Three years later, during the early 1990s recession, he bought it back for 25 million markka.

Salmela has said in an interview that in the beginning, the name of the street his kiosk was located at sufficed for a name for the kiosk. After Salmela had founded his restaurant chain company, it needed a proper name. The name "Hesburger" was suggested, but Salmela thought the name didn't have "an American feel" to it. So he asked an advertisement bureau to come up with a name for his company. The advertisement bureau thought about suitable names for a couple of weeks, and in the end presented Salmela with the name they came up with, along with a bill of 100 thousand markka: "Hesburger".

With only 12 outlets in 1992, Hesburger expanded to over 200 restaurants in 60 cities and towns across Finland over the following decade, absorbing rival chain Carrols in 2002. The purchase of Carrols gave Hesburger some previously nonexistent leverage on the fast food market of Helsinki. Hesburger has kept rival chain McDonald's out of Turku efficiently: in 2014, there were 21 Hesburgers but only two McDonald's locations in the city. Hesburger has also expanded to international markets, opening outlets in the Baltic states and in Hamburg, Germany, as well as a single location in Alanya, Turkey (opened in 2014, closed unknown date). There was a Hesburger in Damascus, Syria for a short period between 2004 and 2006, but it was closed as unprofitable. Further expansion into the Middle East has been discussed by the company.

In 2018, Hesburger asked an American martial artist and actor Chuck Norris to promote the burger chain's then-new mobile app. The commercial was filmed at the then-Hesburger restaurant in Munkkiniemi, which was demolished in late 2025. When asked in an interview what a burger with the Chuck Norris name would be like, Norris replied that it would be topped with mushrooms and jalapenos.

Hesburger expanded to Poland by opening a delivery-only restaurant in Warsaw in 2024.

In summer of 2024, Hesburger expanded to Romania by opening its first restaurant in Râmnicu Vâlcea.

In July 2025, Hesburger announced that it will discontinue the sale of its children’s meal (Lastenateria) in all operating countries beginning in spring 2026. The decision was attributed to the chain’s efforts to promote corporate responsibility, evolving consumer expectations, and adherence to new marketing guidelines regarding advertising targeted at children.

=== Russia ===
The first attempts to enter the Russian market were made at the end of the 80's. In the summer of 1988 through the joint Soviet-Finnish enterprise in St. Petersburg (and later in Vyborg and Petrozavodsk) street tents opened under the Liha Polar brand made in the Hesburger color scheme. In the menu was hamburgers, cheeseburgers, fries and other dishes are typical for Hesburger. In the late 1990s/early 2000s restaurants ceased to exist for unknown reasons.

The first Russian Hesburger opened in January 2010 in Moscow, and a year later in St. Petersburg. The network worked on the rights of master franchise LLC Rusburger, owned by the meat-industrial company Ostankino. By the end of 2012, Hesburger still opened 13 restaurants, as well as with the help of partners launched restaurants in Ufa, Krasnoyarsk and in the far East.

In December 2013, Hesburger changed owners and became a group of companies called "Megagrupp".

On March 29, 2022, Hesburger announced a slow departure from the Russian and Belarusian markets. 40 restaurants were available in Russia.

In May, a local brand called SuperBurger was registered with a logo similar to Hesburger's, and intended to replace Hesburger.

Some Hesburger restaurants continued to operate as of April 2023.

=== Iran ===
Hesburger opened its first franchise restaurant in Tehran, Iran, in April 2018. However, the venture was very short-lived; the company shut down operations and pulled out of the country just a few months later in October 2018 due to economic uncertainties and international sanctions.

== Restaurants ==
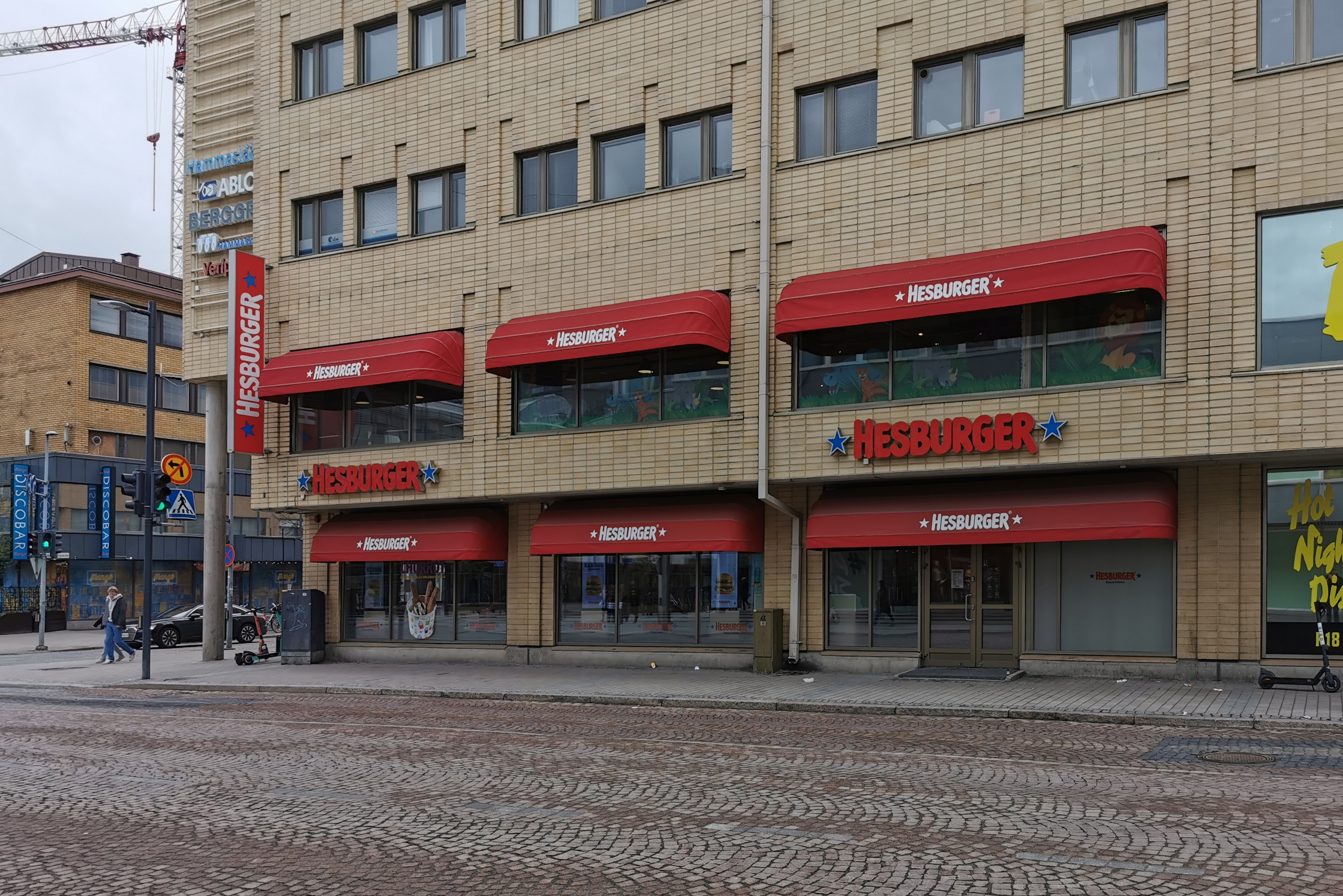
Hesburger restaurant in Oulu

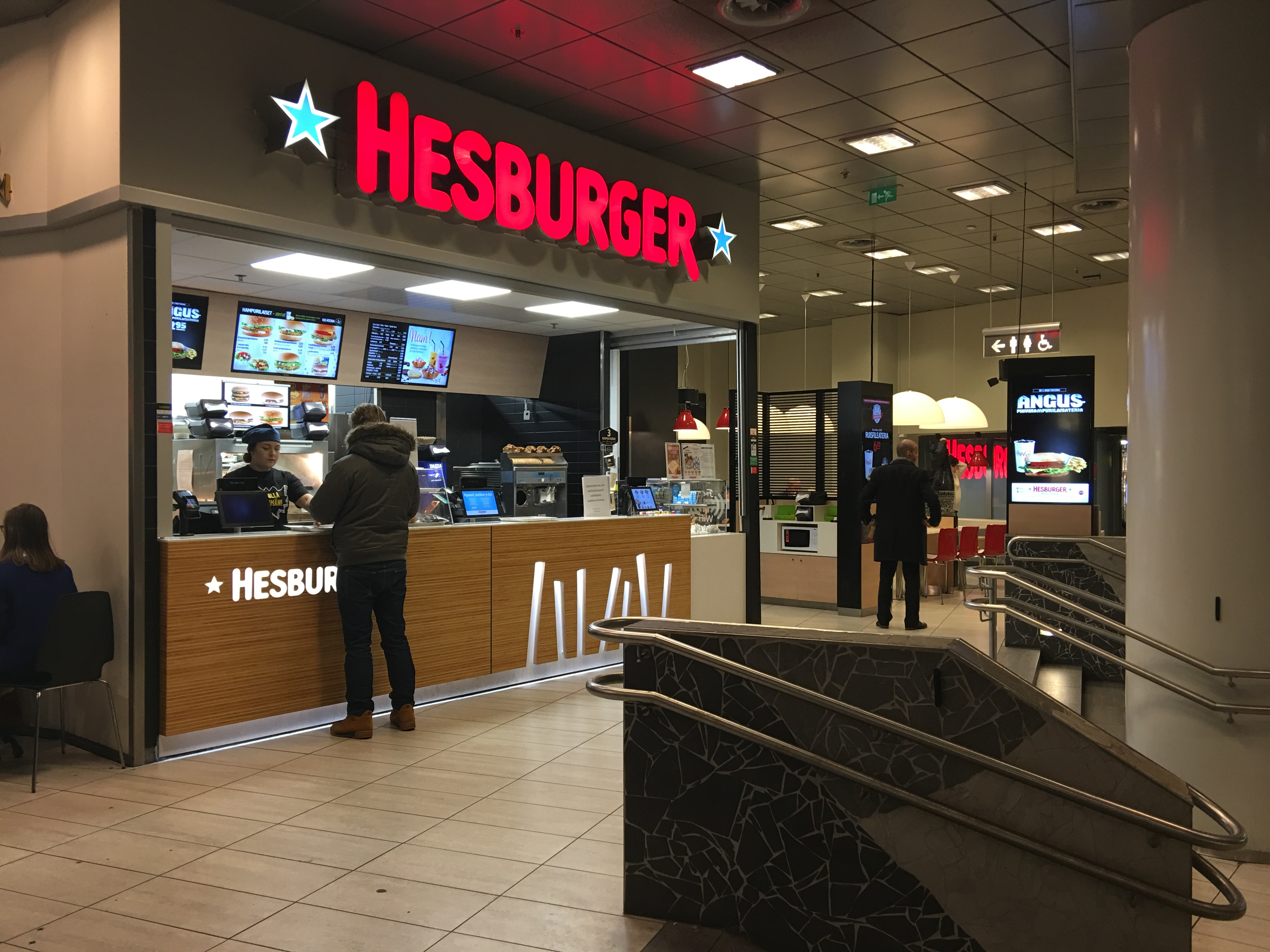
A modern Hesburger restaurant at University of Helsinki metro station.

Hesburger automated order machines

Hesburger employs over 8,000 people, of whom 5,400 are based in Finland. Hesburger has been actively expanding its operations in Lithuania, announcing investments of 3,5 million euros in 2016, around 4 million in 2017 and 4 million in 2018.

Country	Number of restaurants
Finland	258
Lithuania	69
Latvia	55
Estonia	54
Bulgaria	34
Romania	15
Ukraine	7
Germany	2
Poland	1
Italy	1

== Operations ==
- Hesburger hamburger restaurants
- Hesecafe – hamburgers, coffee drinks and pastries
- HeseHotelli – hotels with Hesburger restaurant also acting as the hotel reception
- Hese kotituotteet – retail products
- Hese Nakkari – snack kiosk products
- Heseautopesu – car wash services for Hesburger customers
- Döner HeseKebab & Gyros - sells Döner Kebabs and Gyros
- HesePark - a skate park in Turku
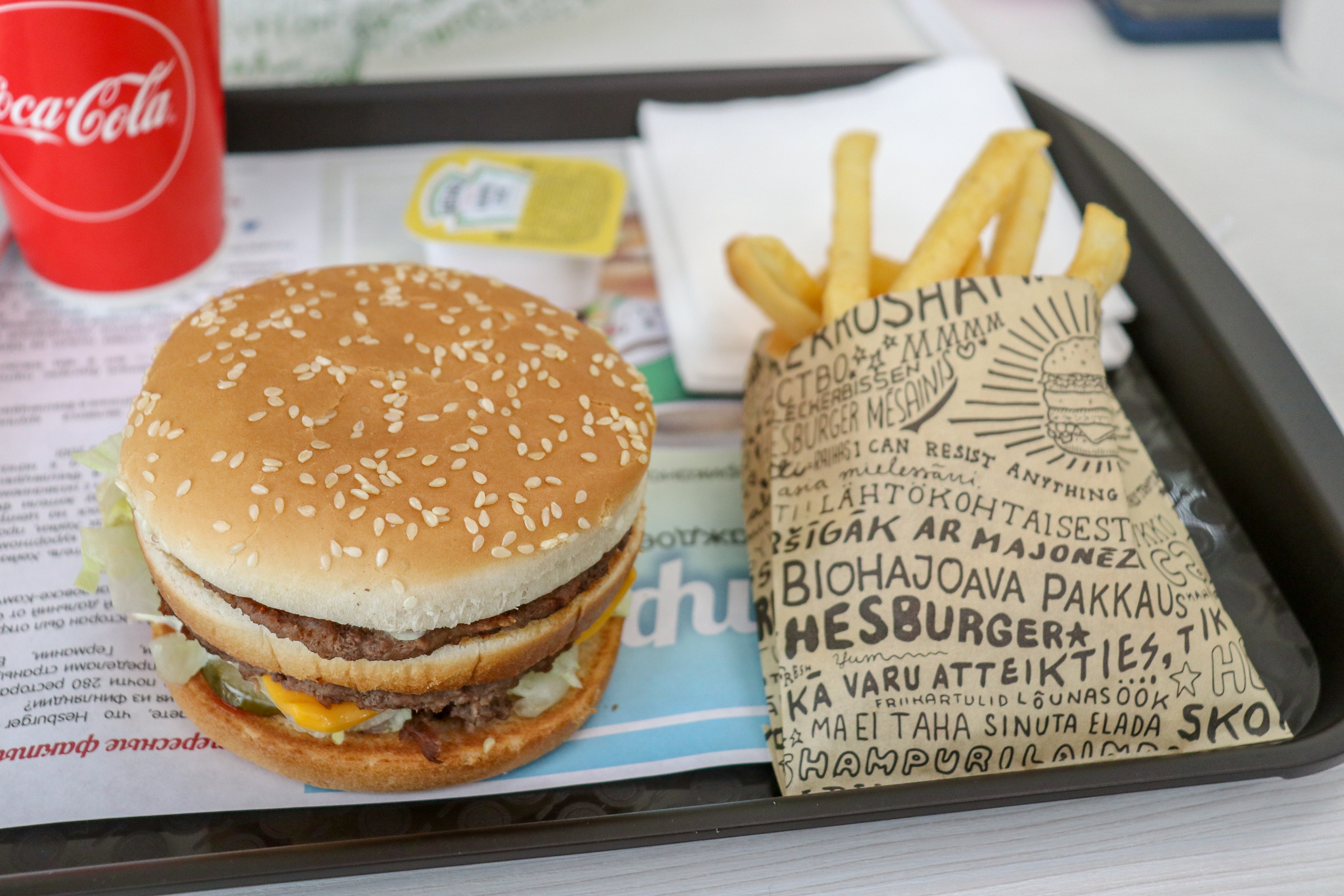
Hesburger hamburger and fries

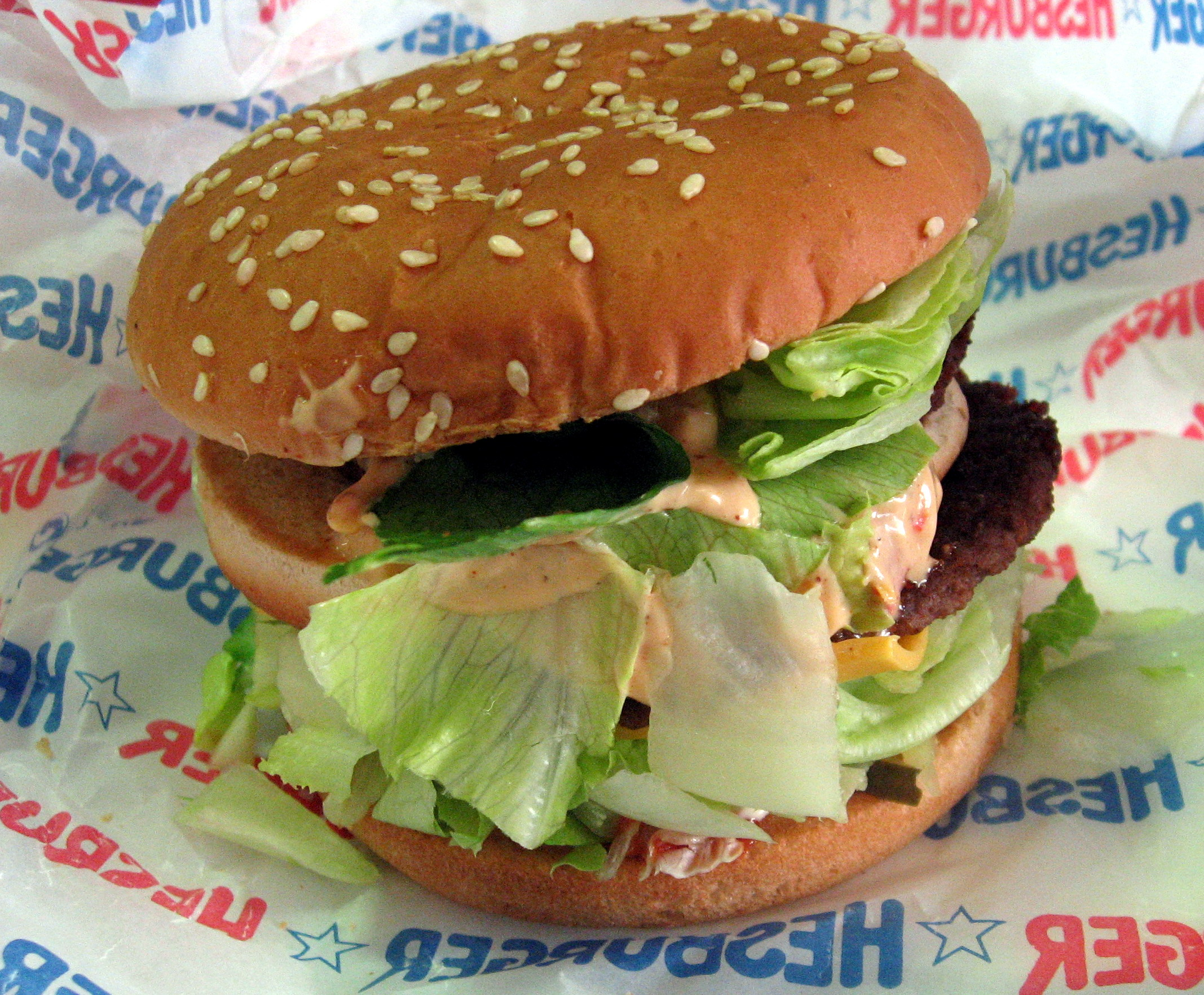
Hesburger burger

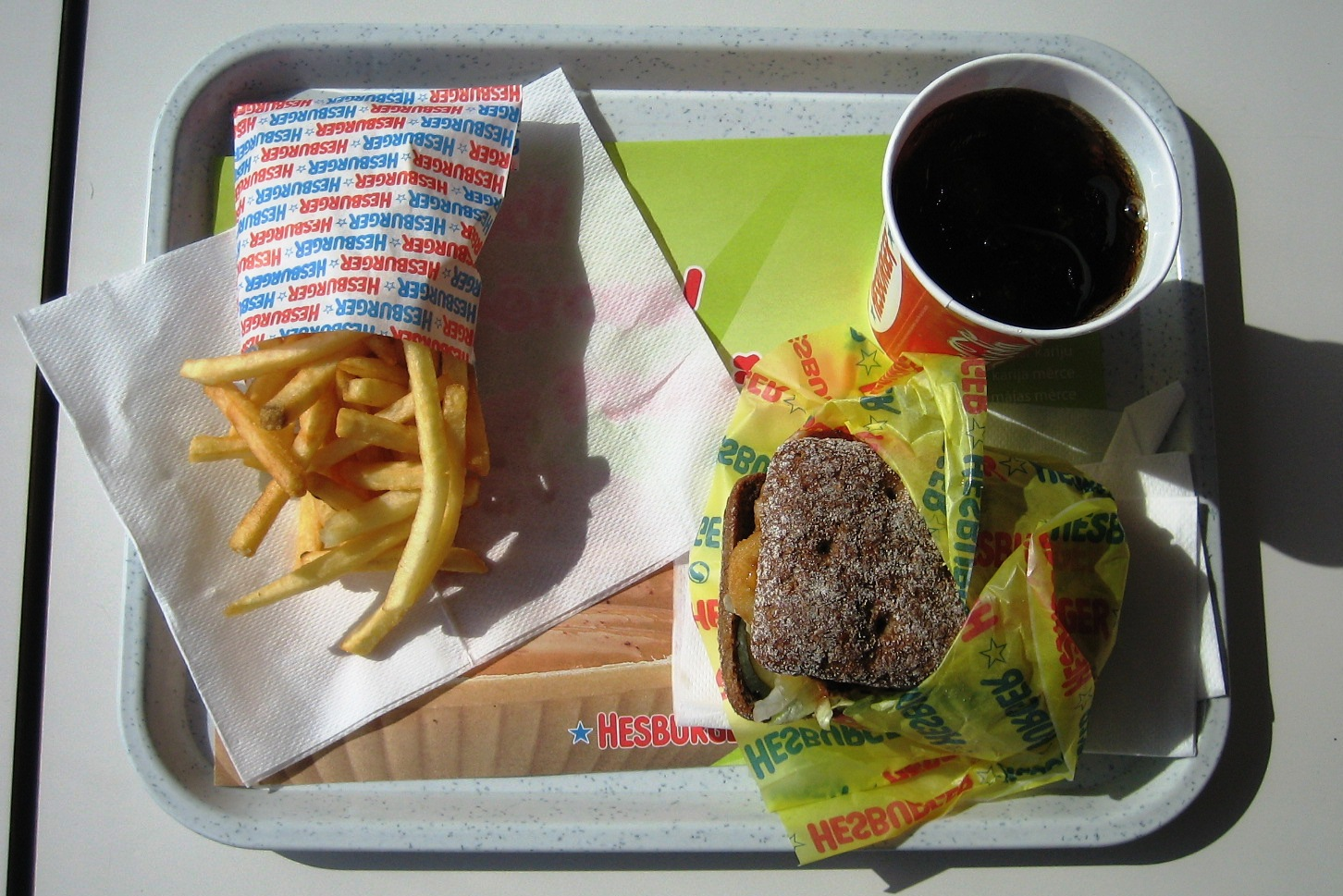
Pork Fillet on Rye bread, French fries and a Coke Zero (regular)

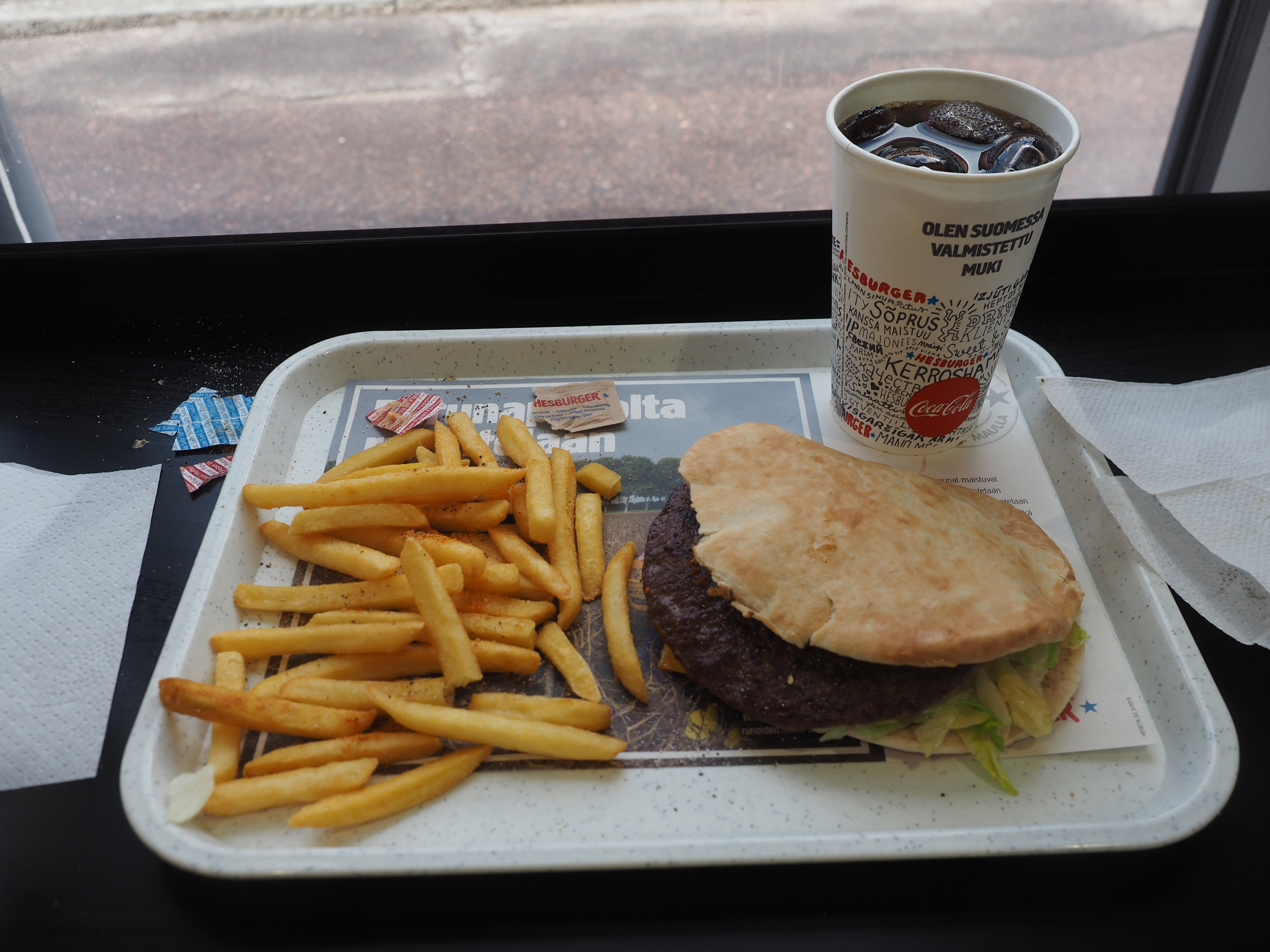
Kebab hamburger meal

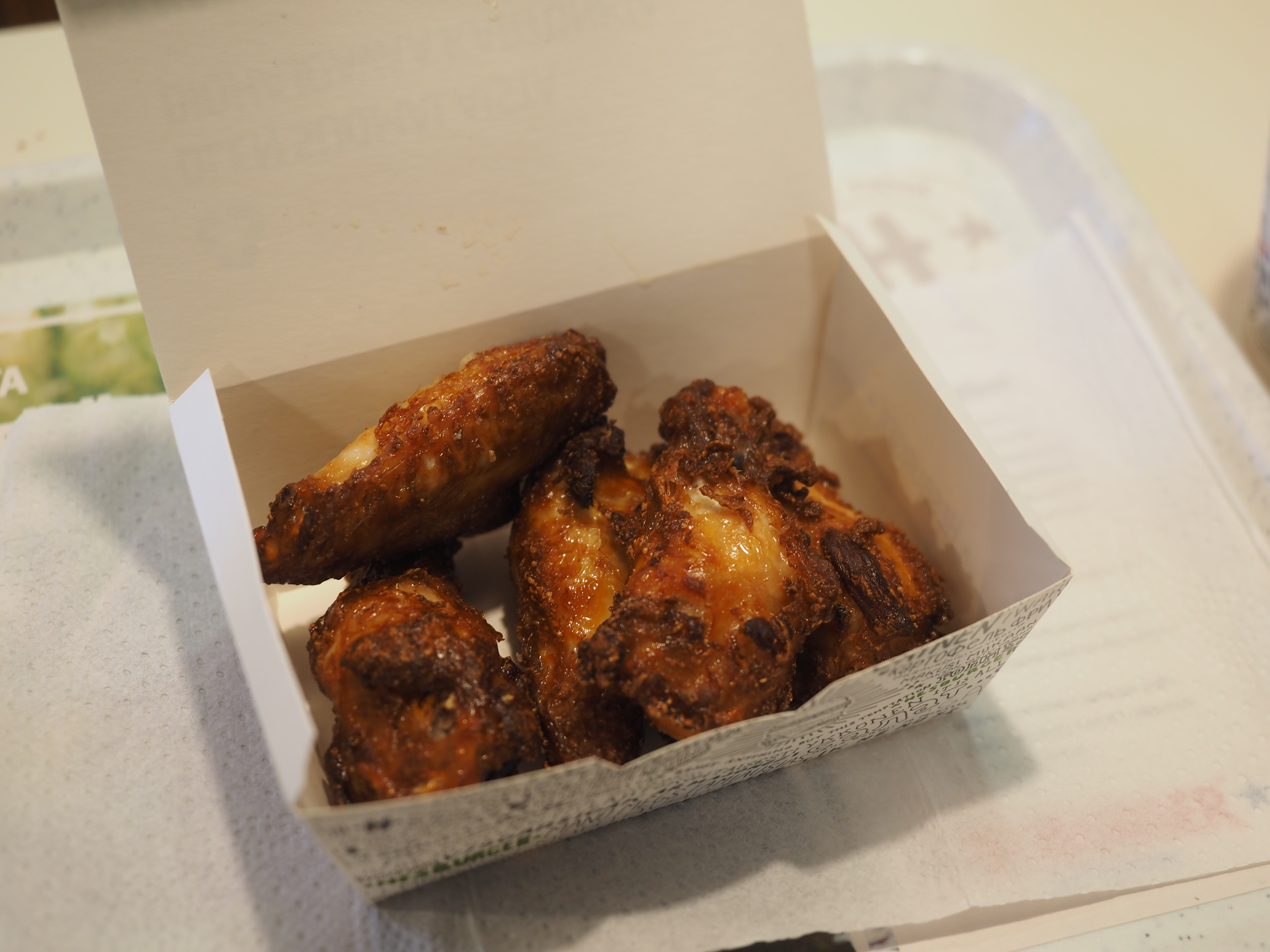
Chicken wings

== Reception ==
Hesburger's burgers have gained recognition worldwide, thanks to tourism, among other things. In January 2025, Natasha Lovell-Smith of Yahoo! Life listed the "41 greatest fast food burgers of all time", with Hesburger's Double Burger ranked 18th. In July 2025, popular American YouTube star Darren Jason Watkins Jr., also known as IShowSpeed, visited Finland during his European tour, where, after tasting a Hesburger burger, he said in a live broadcast that he "haven't tasted such a good burger in all of Europe."

== See also ==
- List of hamburger restaurants
