= Heikki Salmela =

Finnish business executive (born 1946)

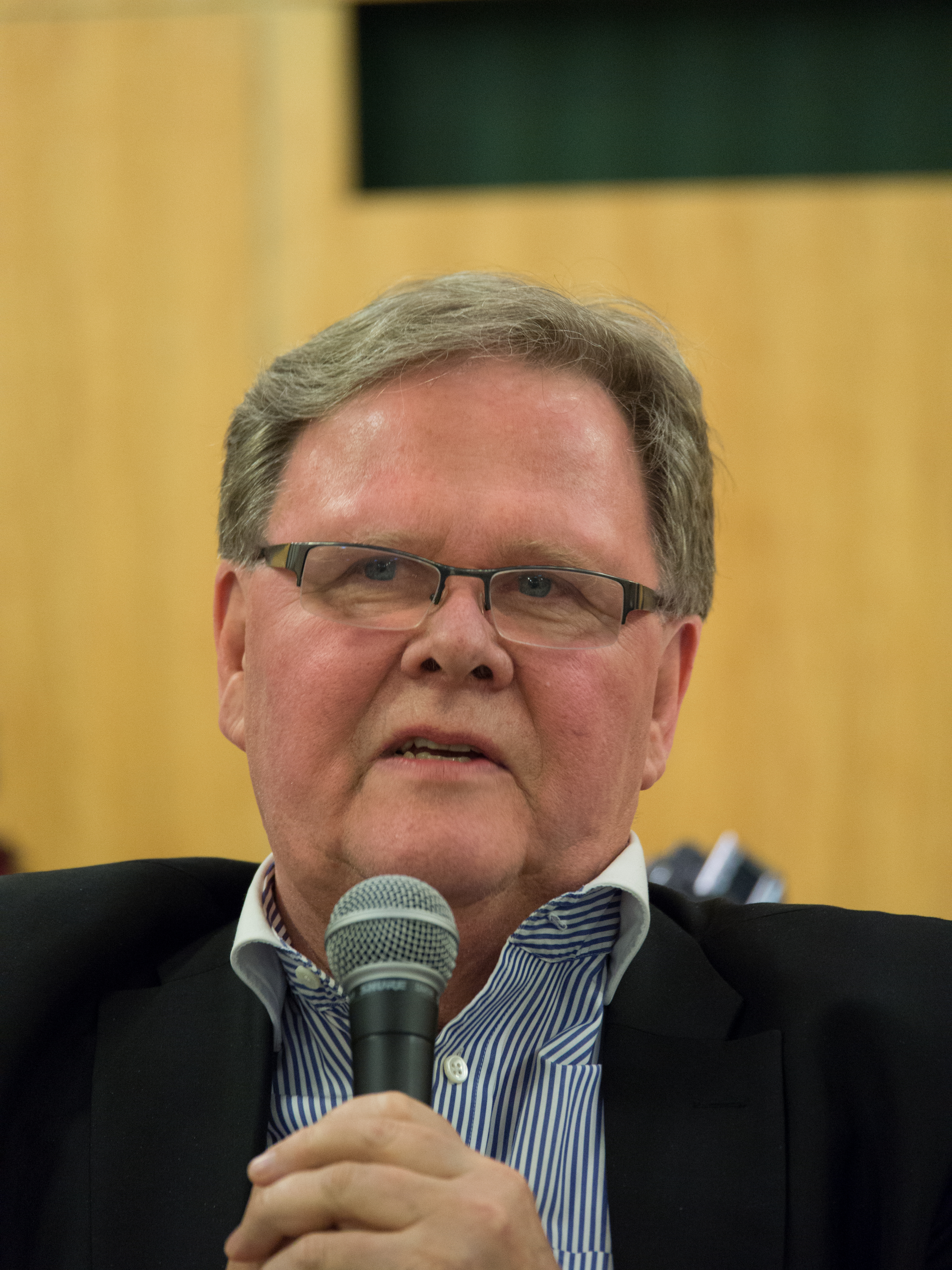
Heikki Salmela in 2013.

Heikki Juhani "Hessu" Salmela (born 30 December 1946 in Turku) is a Finnish fast food entrepreneur. He is the founder of the Hesburger chain of fast food restaurants, the largest fast food restaurant chain in Finland.

== Career ==
Salmela started his career in the restaurant business at the age of 15 as a kitchen trainee. He also worked at the plumbing company Raita as an errand boy. In 1966 at the age of 19 he founded his first company, a café and grill stand in Naantali. He founded his first Hesburger restaurant in Turku in 1980. Salmela sold the chain off in 1988 but later bought it back in 1991.

Salmela was a member of the board in the company Söder Airlines which suffered from financial difficulties in 2004 but left his post at the board as he "had no understanding about flying". Salmela was also a member of the board at the Turku Caribia spa hotel but sold the hotel off to the Danish investment company Property Group in late 2006. Salmela bought the hotel Marina Palace in central Turku on the River Aura in 2002.

In 2016 Salmela said that social security weakens the motivation to work, and according to him studying until the age of 30 is a waste of time. He has also expressed his contempt for "needless and ineffective people" at an Yle interview.

Salmela has expressed his views in other interviews in 2016. According to him only a clean market economy can lift Finland from its downfall. Salmela suggested that the overall binding of work contracts should be discontinued and salaries should come directly from supply and demand and that working conditions should be defined separately at each workplace. According to Salmela, the only reason for Hesburger's problems with profit was the growth of personnel expenses. Salmela has also expressed contempt towards enterprise support grants as well as for other grants and assistance packages.

In spring 2020 Salmela demanded the government of Finland should grant rescue packages for enterprises because of the COVID-19 pandemic. According to Salmela the government should take a loan of 15 to 20 billion euro to cover the losses of all enterprises in Finland so they could later continue their business as normal.

In June 2021 Salmela bought part of the Alfa-tv television channel. He is also a significant ownership partner of the ice hockey team TuTo Hockey.

== Business ==
According to Suomen Asiakastieto Oy, Hesburger is the largest hamburger restaurant chain in Finland both in terms of revenue and in terms of number of locations. Nowadays Salmela is concentrating on the company Clewer acting in cleaning sewage water, where he serves as the chairman of the board.

== Family ==
Salmela was married in 1966. He and his wife Kirsti have two sons, Kari and Marko, and the entire family works at the Hesburger restaurant chain. Heikki and Kirsti Salmela have actively participated in Christian activity and have supported several Christian events such as the Joensuu Gospel festival.

The Arvopaperi magazine estimated in 2021 that the overall value of the Hes-Pro and Burger-in companies owned by Salmela and his family would be about 109 million euro.

== Election support ==
Heikki Salmela has gathered financial support for Alexander Stubb at the 2024 Finnish presidential election together with a group of businessmen in Turku. Previously Salmela had supported Sauli Niinistö with an overall sum of 20 thousand euro both as a private person as a representative of his real estate company. The group gathering the financial support has been united with entrepreneurship and a Coalition Party ideology.
