= Heikki Kyöstilä =

Finnish business executive

- Born: 19 January 1946 (age 80)
- Occupations: Founder, owner and president, Planmeca

Karl Heikki Kyöstilä (born 19 January 1946) is a Finnish billionaire, and the founder, owner and president of dental equipment maker Planmeca.

Kyöstilä founded Planmeca in Helsinki in 1971, and it now employs 2,700 people worldwide.

Kyöstilä lives in Helsinki, Finland.
