= Planmeca =

Finnish dentistry technology company

Planmeca Oy
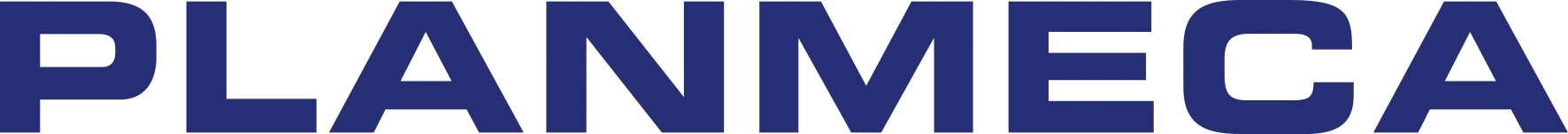
- Company type: Osakeyhtiö
- Industry: Dental equipment and supplies
- Founded: 1971; 55 years ago in Helsinki, Finland
- Founder: Heikki Kyöstilä
- Headquarters: Helsinki, Finland
- Area served: Worldwide
- Key people: Heikki Kyöstilä (Chairman & CEO)
- Revenue: 1.2 billion euros (2025)
- Number of employees: 4,434 (2025)
- Subsidiaries: Plandent; Planmed; LM-Instruments; Opus Systemer; Triangle furniture Systems
- Website: www.planmeca.com

Planmeca Oy is a Finnish manufacturer of high-tech dental equipment. Established in 1971, it produces equipment such as 3D and 2D digital imaging devices, dental units, CAD/CAM solutions and software.

Planmeca works in close cooperation with dental universities and institutions.

Planmeca’s products are designed and manufactured in Helsinki, Finland, and distributed via a network of dealers operating around the world. More than 98% of Planmeca’s production is exported to over 120 countries.

== History ==
Planmeca was founded by Heikki Kyöstilä in 1971.

In the 1970s, Planmeca manufactured dental stools and instrument cabinets, and created its first patient chair and dental unit.

The 1980s was a decade of international expansion and subsidiaries were established abroad. Planmeca introduced a microprocessor-controlled dental chair, a panoramic X-ray device and dental unit.

In the 1990s, Planmeca introduced a dental unit with an integrated patient chair. The decade was also an era of digital progress – Planmeca introduced an integrated information technology system for a digital dental practice, the all in one-concept. The concept allowed instant access to all digital clinical patient information at chair side via one software.

In the 2000s, Planmeca introduced a dental unit that could be converted from right- to left-handed use with motorised movements as well as the Planmeca Romexis software for processing patient information, dental unit’s user activities and images. Planmeca also introduced a new SCARA technology in its X-ray units, which enabled free formation of imaging geometry.

In the 2010s, the concept of Digital perfection was launched. The combination of a digital intraoral scan, a 3D X-ray (CBCT) and a 3D facial photo provides comprehensive information on the patient’s anatomy.

In 2025, Planmeca signed an agreement with the American healthcare company Aspen Dental to implement Planmeca's imaging technology across its nationwide network of clinics over the next five years. In the United States, Aspen Dental currently operates about 1,100 offices, and the agreement also includes installations for any new clinics that may open. At the core of the partnership are imaging devices from the Planmeca Visio product family. In addition to the equipment, the clinics will receive Planmeca's imaging software and an IoT solution that provides real-time information on device status and maintenance needs.

== Co-operation with universities ==
Planmeca offers solutions designed especially for teaching environments. Planmeca supplies dental units and X-ray units to universities and hospitals around the world.

== Planmeca Group ==
Planmeca Oy is the parent company of Planmeca Group. The Group operates in the field of healthcare technology and consists of six companies. The Group employs approximately 2,800 people worldwide and the turnover for 2018 amounts to MEUR 746. The headquarters is located in Helsinki, Finland.

In addition to Planmeca Oy, the companies belonging to Planmeca Group are: Planmed Oy, a manufacturer of mammography and orthopaedic imaging equipment, Plandent Oy, a full-service dental supply company, LM-Instruments Oy, a manufacturer of dental hand instruments, Opus Systemer AS, a developer of dental software solutions and Triangle Furniture Systems Inc., a manufacturer of dental practice cabinetry solutions.
