= Henry (surname) =

Henry is an English male given name and an Irish and French surname, borrowed from Old French, originally of Germanic origin (Haimirich) from the elements haim ("home") and ric ("powerful"). Equivalents in other languages are Anraí (Irish), Eanruig (Scots Gaelic), Enrico, Amerigo (Italian), Enrique (Spanish), Heinrich (German), Henning (Swedish), Henri (Modern French), Henrik (Hungarian and Scandinavian), Henrique (Portuguese), Henryk (Polish), (H)enric (Occitan surname), Hendrik (Dutch), and Genrikh (Russian), among others.

== People with the surname ==
=== Academics and scientists ===
- Camille Goldstone-Henry, Australian businesswoman and wildlife scientist
- Étienne-Ossian Henry (1798–1873), French chemist
- George Morrison Reid Henry (1891–1983), entomologist and ornithologist
- Joseph Henry (1797–1878), American physicist
- Ken Henry (public servant) (born 1957), Australian economist
- Marguerite Henry (scientist) (1895–1982), Australian zoologist
- Michel Henry (1922–2002), French philosopher
- Nathalie Henry Riche, French-American information visualization researcher
- Stuart Henry (criminologist) (born 1949), professor of criminal justice
- Teuira Henry (1847–1915), Tahitian ethnologist
- Victor Henry (philologist) (1850–1907), French philologist
- Warren Elliot Henry (1909–2001), American physicist

=== Artists and entertainers ===
- Big Boy Henry (1921–2004), American Piedmont blues guitarist, singer and songwriter
- Buck Henry (1930–2020), American actor and screenwriter
- Chad Henry (born 1946), American musical theatre composer
- Clarence "Frogman" Henry (1937–2024), American rhythm and blues singer
- David Eugene Henry (born 1946), American painter and sculptor
- Dorothy Henry (1925–2020), American artist and cartoonist
- Edward Lamson Henry (1841–1919), American genre painter
- Francesca Henry (born 1995), English actress
- François-Louis Henry (1786–1855), French opera singer
- George Henry (painter) (1858–1943), Scottish painter
- Gregg Henry, American actor
- Gloria Henry (1923–2021), American actress
- Jim Henry (singer) (born 1964), bass singer in barbershop quartets
- Katie Henry, American blues rock singer, guitarist, pianist and songwriter
- Lenny Henry (born 1958), British comedian
- Mike Henry (actor), (born 1964), American writer, producer, voice actor, and comedian
- Pierre Henry (1927–2017), French composer
- Robert Henri (1865–1929), American painter
- Sam Henry (musician) (1956–2022), American drummer
- Stuart Henry (DJ) (1942–1995), British disc jockey

=== Clergy ===
- Caleb Sprague Henry (1804–1884), American clergyman
- Carl F. H. Henry (1913–2003), American theologian
- Harold William Henry (1909–1976), American-born Catholic archbishop in South Korea
- Henry A. Henry (c. 1800–1879), British-American rabbi
- Matthew Henry (1662–1714), English divine
- Philip Henry (clergyman) (1631–1696), English clergyman

=== Politicians and public servants ===
- Albert Henry (politician) (1907–1981), Premier of the Cook Islands
- Alexander Henry (Philadelphia) (1823–1883), mayor of Philadelphia, U.S.
- Ariel Henry (born 1949), Haitian neurosurgeon and politician
- Bonnie Henry (born 1965), Canadian physician, Provincial Health Officer for British Columbia
- Brad Henry (born 1963), Governor of Oklahoma, U.S.
- Cameron Henry (born 1974), Louisiana politician
- Dana Henry, American politician in Louisiana
- Daniel Maynadier Henry (1823–1899), U.S. Representative from Maryland
- Douglas Henry (1926–2017), American politician
- E. L. Henry (1936–2025), American politician in Louisiana
- Edward Henry (1850–1931), London police commissioner
- Edward Stevens Henry (1836–1921), American politician
- Émile Henry (anarchist) (1872–1894), French anarchist
- Geoffrey Henry, (1940–2012), Premier of the Cook Islands
- George Stewart Henry, (1871–1958) Canadian politician
- Joyce Henry, American politician
- Ken Henry (public servant), Australian economist
- Patrick Henry (1736–1799), American politician
- Stuart Henry (politician) (born 1946), Australian politician

=== Athletes ===
- Alan Henry, British motorsports journalist
- Aneika Henry (born 1986), American-Azerbaijani basketball player
- Beau Henry, Australian rugby league footballer
- Bernard Henry (American football) (born 1960), American football player
- Camille Henry, Canadian ice hockey player
- Chris Henry (wide receiver) (1983–2009), American football player
- Clarence Henry (boxer) (1926–1999), 1950s leading heavyweight American boxer
- Cole Henry (born 1999), American baseball player
- Derrick Henry (born 1994), American football player
- Frank Henry (cricketer) (dates unknown), cricketer
- Gordon Henry (footballer) (1930–2007), Scottish footballer
- Graham Henry (born 1946), New Zealand rugby union coach
- Hunter Henry (born 1994), American football player
- Jim Henry (equestrian) (born 1947), Canadian Olympic equestrian
- KJ Henry (born 1999), American football player
- Lerissa Henry (born 1997), Micronesian sprinter
- Malik Henry (born 1998), American football player
- Marcus Henry (offensive lineman) (born 1993), American football center
- Marcus Henry (wide receiver) (born 1986), American former wide receiver
- Mark Henry (born 1971), American professional wrestler
- Matt Henry (cricketer) (born 1991), New Zealand cricketer
- Mike Henry, (1936–2021), American football player and actor
- Mitchell Henry (American football) (1992–2017), American football player
- Neil Henry, Australian rugby league football coach
- Nola Henry (born 1994), American basketball coach
- Payton Henry (born 1997), American baseball player
- Robert Henry Jr. (born 2001), American football player
- Sek Henry (born 1987), American-Jamaican professional basketball player, 2018 Israeli Basketball Premier League MVP
- Thierry Henry (born 1977), French footballer
- Tommy Henry (American football) (born 1969), American football player
- Tommy Henry (baseball) (born 1997), American baseball player
- Travis Henry (born 1978), American football player
- Triston Henry (born 1993), Canadian soccer player
- Xavier Henry (born 1991), American basketball player
- Willie Henry (born 1994), American football player

=== Other people ===
- Alan Henry, Lifehacker staff writer
- Benjamin Tyler Henry (1821–1898), American inventor of the Henry rifle
- Beulah Louise Henry (1887–1973), American inventor; nicknamed "Lady Edison"
- Hubert-Joseph Henry, French soldier involved in the Dreyfus Affair
- Philip Henry, 4th and 5th Earl Stanhope
- S. M. I. Henry (1839–1900), American evangelist, temperance reformer, poet, author

== People with the pen name ==
- O. Henry, pen name of American writer William Sydney Porter (1862–1910)
- Will Henry, pen name of American screenwriter Henry Wilson Allen (1912–1991)
- Will Henry, pen name of William Henry Wilson, cartoonist and writer of Wallace the Brave

== Disambiguation pages ==
- Alexander Henry (disambiguation) several people
- Charles Henry (disambiguation), several people
- David Henry (disambiguation), several people
- Frederick Henry (disambiguation), several people
- James Henry, several people
- Jim Henry (disambiguation), several people
- John Henry (disambiguation), several people
- Paul Henry (disambiguation), several people
- Robert Henry (disambiguation), several people
- Bill, Will or William Henry (disambiguation), several people
- Justice Henry (disambiguation)

== See also ==
- Hendric
- Hendrick (disambiguation)
- Hendricks (disambiguation)
- Hendrickx
- Hendrik (disambiguation)
- Hendriks
- Hendrikx
- Hendrix (disambiguation)
- Hendryx
- Henri
- Henrik
- Henryk (given name)
- Henry family of New Zealand
