= David Henry =

David Henry may refer to:

- David Henry (Gaelic footballer), Gaelic footballer with the Dublin county team
- David Henry (bodybuilder) (born 1975), American bodybuilder
- David Henry (businessman) (1888–1963), Scottish-born New Zealand industrialist, company director and philanthropist
- David Joseph Henry (born 1983), English writer, activist and parliamentary candidate
- David Henry (cricketer) (born 1947), New Zealand cricketer
- David Henry (Australian footballer) (born 1956), Australian rules footballer
- David Morrison Reid Henry (1919–1977), British illustrator of birds
- David Eugene Henry (born 1946), American painter and sculptor

== See also ==
- David Henrie (born 1989), American actor
- Reid David Henry, guitarist at My Darkest Days, lead singer of Deadset Society
- Henry (surname)
