= William Henry =

Willie, Billy, Bill, Will or William Henry may refer to:

== Politicians ==
- William Henry (gunsmith) (1729–1786), American gunsmith and Pennsylvania delegate to Continental Congress
- William Henry (brother of Patrick Henry) (1734–1785), American member of Colonial Virginia House of Burgesses
- William Henry (Vermont politician) (1788–1861), American legislator from Vermont
- William Alexander Henry (1816–1888), Canadian Supreme Court justice
- William Wirt Henry (1831–1900), American lawyer, politician and historian in Virginia
- William H. Henry, Socialist Party of America Executive Secretary during late 1920s
- William Thomas Henry (1872–1952), Canadian politician; Legislative Assembly of Alberta member
- William Henry, Libertarian nominee for lieutenant governor of Indiana in the 2020 Indiana gubernatorial election
- Bill Henry (comptroller), member of the Baltimore City Council

== Royalty ==
- William Henry, Prince of Orange (1650–1702), future King William III of England
- William Henry, Prince of Nassau-Usingen (1684–1718), member of German royalty
- William Henry, Prince of Nassau-Saarbrücken (1718–1768), member of German royalty
- Prince William Henry, Duke of Gloucester and Edinburgh (1743–1805), younger brother of King George III of the United Kingdom
- William Henry, Duke of Clarence (1765–1837), future King William IV of the United Kingdom

== Sportspeople ==
- William Henry (swimmer) (1859–1928), English Olympic competitor
- Billy Henry (1884–after 1960), Scottish footballer
- Bill Henry (footballer) (1904–1974), Australian rules forward
- Bill Henry (basketball) (1924–1985), American center
- Bill Henry (baseball, born 1927) (1927–2014), American pitcher for six MLB teams
- Bill Henry (baseball, born 1942), American pitcher for New York Yankees
- Will Henry (footballer) (born 1998), English goalkeeper

== Writers ==
- William Henry (priest) (before 1728–1768), Anglo-Irish Dean of Killaloe
- William Arnon Henry (1850–1932), American academic and agriculturist from Ohio
- William J. Henry (1867–1955), American hymn writer
- Bill Henry (journalist) (1890–1970), American newspaper reporter
- Bill Fitz Henry (1903–1957), Australian journalist with The Bulletin
- William E. Henry (1918–1994), American psychologist
- William A. Henry III (1950–1994), American author and cultural critic
- Will Henry, pen name of American screenwriter Henry Wilson Allen (1912–1991)
- Will Henry, pen name of William Henry Wilson, cartoonist and writer of Wallace the Brave

== Other people ==
- William Henry (missionary) (1770-1859), Irish missionary, active in Tahiti and New South Wales, Australia
- William Henry (chemist) (1774–1836), English chemist who formulated Henry's law
- William Henry (pastor) (1783-1839), Scottish Congregationalist pastor
- William "Jerry" Henry (1811–after 1851), American fugitive slave who was freed in New York event known as Jerry Rescue
- William W. Henry (1831–1915), American Civil War Medal of Honor recipient
- William Henry (actor) (1914–1982), American performer; also billed as Bill Henry
- E. William Henry (1929–2022), American public official; chairman of FCC
- Willie Henry (born 1994), American football player

== Other uses ==
- Bill Henry (film), 1919 American comedy directed by Jerome Storm

== See also ==
- Fort William Henry, British fort built in upper New York during 1754–63 French and Indian War; referenced in Last of the Mohicans
- William-Henry, name of Canadian city Sorel-Tracy from 1787 to 1845
- William Henry Haines (1811–1884), English painter exhibited under the name William Henry
