= Charles Henry =

Charles, Charlie, or Chuck Henry may refer to:

== Sportsmen ==
- Charlie Henry (baseball) (1900–1972), American Negro leagues baseball player
- Charles Henry (basketball), Gonzaga basketball coach for the 1943–44 season
- Charlie Henry (footballer, born 1962), English former footballer for Swindon Town, Torquay United, Northampton Town and Aldershot
- Charles Henry (American football) (born 1964), former American football player
- Charlie Henry (basketball, born 1985), coach in the Chicago Bulls' organization
- Charlie Henry (footballer, born 1986), English footballer

== Politicians ==
- Charles L. Henry (1849–1927), U.S. representative from Indiana
- Sir Charles Henry, 1st Baronet (1860–1919), British member of parliament for Wellington, 1906–1918, and The Wrekin, 1918–1920
- Charles Henry (Canadian politician) (1911–1989), Canadian member of parliament
- Brad Henry (Charles Bradford Henry, born 1963), governor of Oklahoma
- Charles A. Henry, Louisiana state representative

== Others ==
- Charles Henry (librarian) (1859–1926), French librarian and editor
- Charles Trumbo Henry (1902–1964), American artist
- Charles H. Henry (1937–2016), American physicist
- Chuck Henry (born 1946), American TV presenter and newsreader
- Charles J. Henry (born 1950), American librarian

== See also ==
- Chas Henry (born 1989), American football player
