= Commerce Reports =

US Department of Commerce publication

Commerce Reports was an official publication of the United States Department of Commerce, published weekly. It was first published on October 1, 1880. Extant archival copies have been digitized and are part of the Google Books digital library available online. Archival editions have also been digitized by the Digital Library Federation.

== History ==
The first publication was on October 1, 1880, as a monthly under the name Consular Reports. On January 1, 1898, it became a daily under the same name. On July 1, 1905, it was renamed Daily Consular and Trade Reports. On January 1, 1915, it was renamed Commerce Reports.

Commerce Reports (sample issue)

- Volume 3, Issues 40–52, October, November, December 1922

Supplements to Commerce Reports (sample issue)

- Review of Industrial and Trade Conditions of Foreign Countries in 1917 ...

== Library references ==
- Commerce Reports OCLC 853462704
- Supplement to Commerce Reports OCLC 16390134, 16650083
