= Constitutive criminology =

Theory of criminology

Constitutive criminology is an affirmative, postmodernist-influenced theory of criminology posited by Stuart Henry and Dragan Milovanovic in Constitutive Criminology: Beyond Postmodernism (1996), which was itself inspired by Anthony Giddens' The Constitution of Society (1984), where Giddens outlined his "theory of structuration". In this theory, crime is conceived as an integral part of the overall production of society and is a co-production of human agents and the cultural and social structures they continuously create. This theory defines crime as "the harm resulting from humans investing energy in relations of power that denies or diminishes those subject to this investment, their own humanity". From the perspective of constitutive theory, a criminal is viewed as an "excessive investor", while the victim is known as a "recovering subject".

== History of theory ==
Founded by Dragon Milovanovic and Stuart Henry, with contributions from Gregg Barak and Bruce Arrigo, this constitutive theory was based on postmodernist concepts of social theory applied to crime and criminal justice, and formed a new sub-field of critical criminology. Constitutive criminology was introduced via Stuart Henry's studies on control in the workplace and crime in the late 1980s. The central tenet of constitutive theory is that crime and its control cannot be removed from the structural and cultural contexts in which it is produced. One main goal of this theory is to redefine crime as the outcome of "humans investing energy in harm-producing relations of power". It identifies two types of harm: reduction and repression. Offenders are described as "excessive investors investing energy to make a difference to others without those others having the ability to make a difference to them", whereas victims are described as those "who suffer the pain of being denied their own humanity, the power to make a difference".

== Influences ==
Constitutive criminology draws on a vast array of concepts and theories that have come to shape its present standing. It uses ideas from well-known critical social theories (particularly structuration theory and social constructionism), and has roots within chaos theory and postmodernism. A handful of other scholars have strongly influenced constitutive criminology, pushing the theory in new directions while also developing their own analyses.

=== Roots of constitutive theory ===
Henry and Milovanovic drew upon many diverse theories, but the following had a critical impact in their work:

1. Symbolic Interactionism is the theory that human interaction and communication is facilitated by gestures, words, and other symbols with conventional meanings.
2. Social Constructionism describes the ways in which social phenomena are created, established, and then turned into human tradition.
3. Phenomenology, founded by Edmund Husserl in 1900 and applied to the social world by Alfred Schutz, believes in suspending all prior assumptions about causality and consequences in order to investigate the essence of meaning of immediate lived experience.
4. Ethnomethodology, rooted in Schutz's social phenomenology and developed by Harold Garfikel, is the method of commonsense understanding of the organization and structure of society by nonspecialists.
5. Marxist Theory, built on the philosophy of Karl Marx and Friedrich Engels, states that crime and control have the potential to affect the other at the same moment in time from opposite directions with different goals inherent in the construction of each.
6. Poststructural Theory maintains that meanings and intellectual categories are always unstable and ever-changing, even though they appear to be real with independent existence from the humans that create them. Part of the challenge of postmodernism is to engage in constant critique through a process of deconstruction.
7. Structuration Theory, introduced by Anthony Giddens in 1984, claims that not only is society socially constructed, but that it is formed by human agents through their everyday activities.
8. Discourse Analysis covers the many different ways to analyze written, spoken, or signed languages, and any other important semiotic events.

Constitutive criminology also has roots in chaos theory, structural coupling, strategic essentialism, topology theory, relational sets, critical race theory and intersections, autopoietic systems, and dialectical materialism.

== Works of Henry and Milovanovic ==
In 1989, Milovanovic approached Stuart Henry with a request for a six-page, double-spaced response on why he felt that the "Critical Criminologist" (by Marty Schwartz) did not do justice to postmodernist critical theory. After agreeing to contribute to Milovanovic's newsletter (The Critical Criminologist) Henry published a small work under this new title in 1989. From that point on, the two criminologists have teamed up and produced many works on their new theory, Constitutive Criminology.

=== Works by year ===
- 1991: Two preliminary position papers
- 1992: Third paper
- 1993: Short paper on definition of crime
- 1996: First book-length work: Constitutive Criminology: Beyond Postmodernism
- 1999: Edited: Constitutive Criminology at Work; Applications to Crime and Justice

== Main concepts ==
Constitutive Criminology, influenced by postmodernism, tries to understand the co-production of crime by humans in their everyday life with products, institutions, and the ever-widening societal structure. Henry and Milovanovic based their theory on their analysis of human nature and society and around the postmodernist view of the constitution of crime. This intellectual theory covers views about the individual and human behavior, society, crime and its victims, as well as our social structure.

=== Human agents and behavior ===
From the perspective of this theory, the human agent is viewed as an active creator of his or her social environment, while at the same time the social environment is concurrently producing those who created it by shaping their thoughts, meanings, and actions. For the human subjects and their environment to simultaneously evolve, transformations throughout their surroundings are made by interactions with other agents. Henry and Milovanovic's concept of a "recovering subject" states that a human will never fully realize their potential through their actively produced world, and the human subject is never a completed product of his environment. "Humans view themselves as more acted upon than acting", wrote Giddens in 1984. With each human agent feeling relatively insignificant on such a vast planet, many subjects forget their role in creating the social world that objectifies that world.

=== Justice practices ===
With the strategy of deconstructing the ways discourse disempowers some and privileges others, and engaging in reconstruction though the use of non-privileging "replacement discourse", Henry and Milovanovic believe human societies can reduce the frequency of harm through reducing the capacity of excessive investors to dominate and dehumanize others, while trying to accomplish a mass social transformation. The first point of attack in this transformation is to change the discourse that facilitates expressions of power contained in mainstream culture. For this goal to be met, large-scale social groups (which include the news media) must help in this transformation. The media, as it becomes ever more popular, has a very strong influence on today's popular culture, producing discourse that helps perpetuate power and domination as a reality and spreads politically created social problems such as assault, alcohol abuse, or robbery. This in turn causes the social world to act in more harmful ways. As the media portrays crime news in harmful ways, Henry and Milovanovic urge other criminologists to produce a less harmful discourse for the social world to see and begin to understand.

=== Knowledge ===
Constitutive criminology uses the postmodernist view of knowledge as being political, subjective, and placed in order of rank. Knowledge can be used to take control of someone or something, while lacking values and a neutral point of view. According to Henry, "Use of knowledge is an expression of power or resistance to power." He also sees knowledge as a consultation repeatedly being built and used by humans to make claims for the sole use of politics within one's actions. Knowledge and its conditions have always been unifying concerns within this theory, while subjects are slowly becoming more and more alike due to the media and the avalanche of propaganda that follows.
