= James Henry =

James Henry may refer to:

== In government and military ==
- James Henry (Continental Congress) (1731–1804), American lawyer, Continental Congressman for Virginia
- James Buchanan Henry (1833–1915), lawyer, writer, secretary to the President, nephew and ward of James Buchanan
- James D. Henry (1797–1834), American militia officer
- James Henry (judge) (born 1962), justice of the Supreme Court of Queensland
- James Henry (soldier) (1833–1911), Union Army soldier and Medal of Honor recipient
- James R. Henry (politician) (born 1963), member of the Massachusetts House of Representatives

== In sport ==
- James Henry (footballer) (born 1989), English footballer
- James R. Henry (American football), American college football player and coach
- James Henry (ice hockey), American ice hockey player and coach

== Other people ==
- James Henry (poet) (1798–1876), Irish poet and scholar
- James Henry (writer), British comedy writer
- James Dupree Henry (1950–1984), American criminal executed in Florida
- James Macintyre Henry (1852–1929), Scottish architect
- James S. Henry, American economist, attorney, and investigative journalist
- James Pepper Henry, American museum director
- James Henry, Irish translator

== See also ==
- Jim Henry (disambiguation)
- Henry James (disambiguation)
