= National Recording Preservation Plan =

The National Recording Preservation Plan is a strategic guide for the preservation of sound recordings in the United States. It was published in December 2012 by the Council on Library and Information Resources (CLIR) and the National Recording Preservation Board of the Library of Congress. The plan was written by a community of specialists, but is prominently credited to Brenda Nelson-Strauss, Alan Gevinson and Sam Brylawski

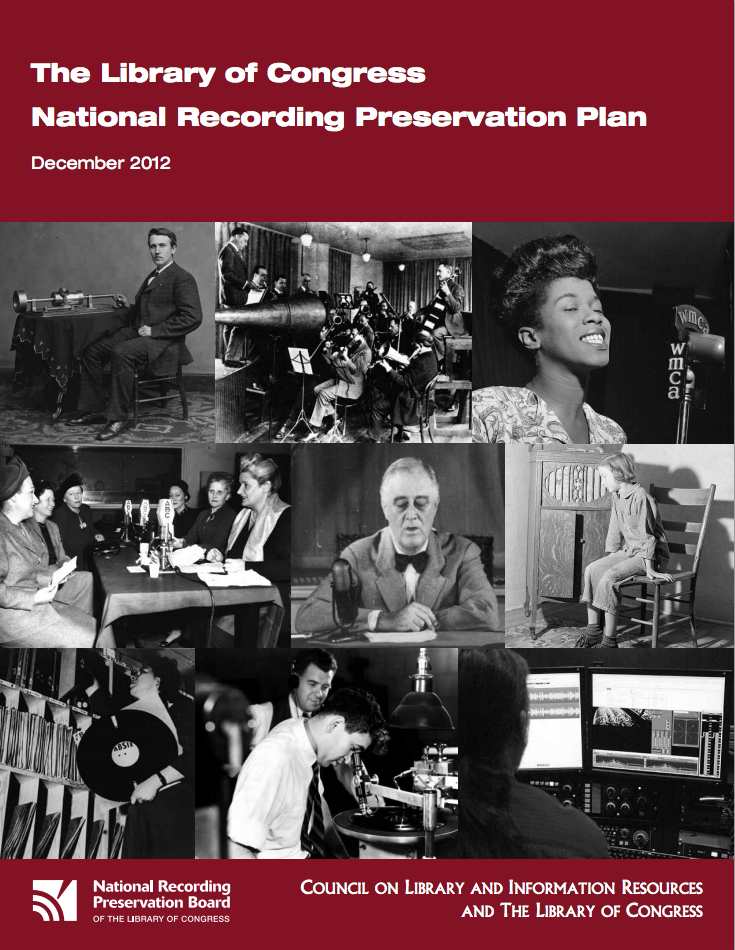
The cover page of the National Recording Preservation Plan

== Background ==
In 2000, Congress passed the "National Recording Preservation Act", which established the National Recording Preservation Foundation and the National Recording Preservation Board. In 2010, this board published a document titled "The State of Recorded Sound Preservation in the United States", which identified legal and technical factors that contribute to the loss of sound recordings. The National Recording Preservation Plan can be considered a response to the challenges identified in this study.

== Content ==
After a foreword by the Librarian of Congress and an executive summary, the plan is divided into four major sections: Building the National Sound Recording Preservation infrastructure, Blueprint for implementing preservation strategies, Promoting broad public access for educational purposes and Long-term national strategies.

=== Building the National Sound Recording Preservation infrastructure ===
This section calls for increased infrastructure to support audio preservation, including more and better storage facilities, education programs, a directory of resources, and a formal agenda for further research.

==== Physical and digital infrastructure ====
Sound recordings on physical media require specific conditions to slow the inevitable degradation of the carriers. Facilities that can accomplish these conditions are expensive to create and maintain, so the plan recommends fundraising for the creation of such facilities and consortial funding and use between smaller institutions.

The need for professional preservation reformatting (digitization) facilities is similar, and the plan suggests similar strategies for increased reformatting in the following section - increased in-house services where feasible, collaboration where necessary, and, possibly, expansion of the National Audio-Visual Conservation Center to allow nonprofit third parties to use their facilities or their services.

Best practices for the archival storage of digital information call for sophisticated networks of storage and curation to ensure the data persist and remain accessible. Few archives currently meet these standards, and there is little research toward the specific needs of audio data. In this section, the plan challenges readers to devise innovative strategies to create and share repositories, and to continue to improve digital storage through research.

==== Education and professional training ====
Audio preservation is not a new discipline, but has traditionally been carried out by personnel with various disparate professional backgrounds. Audio engineers, archivists and librarians, computer scientists, and subject specialists in music, history and folklore (to name a few) have all made important contributions to the practice and literature. There has not, however, traditionally been uniform training in audio preservation. This part of the plan calls for the development of professional educational programs in audio preservation that balance the knowledge of the fields above and would prepare individuals to perform, or at least understand, the many skills required to accomplish this work.

This education will require the identification of and participation by those institutions with the requisite human and technical resources, or the development of these faculties at interested institutions. With these programs in place, funding and internships and fellowships will further allow prospective students to seamlessly enter the field.

In addition to primary education in audio preservation, the next sections call for continuing education for working professionals, and a resource directory that compiles information about educational programs, working professionals and organizations, best practices, general literature, funding institutions, and more. This document, called the Audio Preservation Resource Directory, is frequently referred to throughout the remainder of the plan.

==== National technology research agenda ====
Much research has been done on the attributes and failures of sound media, and best practices in archival transfer, but much more research, such as new methods of transfer, new treatments to deteriorating audio carriers, and new methods of digital storage, is expected to yield promising results in the near future. This research will require collaboration between government, academia and industry in order to leverage existing competencies and avoid duplication of effort.

Much of the information about legacy equipment and skills is held only by senior archivists and engineers who will eventually retire. Recommendation 1.8 suggests readers practice 'knowledge management' by conducting video interviews with senior staff. Any other information held in schematics or equipment manuals should be similarly documented and archived.

=== Blueprint for implementing preservation strategies ===
This section emphasizes the need for a consensus of best practices in the variety of tasks that constitute the audio preservation practice, as well as the need for tools and guidelines for the management of digital audio.

==== Audio preservation management ====
Acknowledging the imminence of many audio preservation projects, the insufficiency of funding for this type of work, and the lack of formally trained professionals in many smaller institutions, recommendation 2.1 calls for the development of a handbook that presents best practices in audio preservation in simple, practical terms. Such a guide would act as an approachable lesson in best practices for personal collectors or smaller institutions.

The next recommendation demonstrates the need for assessment of collections in prioritizing work and generating funding. Assessment can be performed by third-party consultants, or by existing staff with the help of assessment tools, some of which exist, and some that still need to be developed.

Somewhat in alignment with the handbook described above, recommendation 2.3 encourages partnerships between institutions of different types (private vs. public), sizes, finances and goals (etc.). An example of this might be a non-profit community radio station working with a university to store or transfer an important collection of radio program transcriptions that the station would not be able to handle on its own.

==== New tools and guidelines for preserving digital audio files ====
Although digital audio is often perceived as the 'destination' of audio preservation activity, it is more accurately a halfway point. Digital transfers of legacy audio and born-digital audio must be actively maintained to ensure continued preservation and accessibility. Some foresight in the production of digital audio can facilitate these goals moving forward.

Recommendation 2.4 encourages successful institutions to share the tools and strategies that allowed them to create useful digital audio objects. While these will certainly vary project to project and institution to institution, some strategies may be widely or universally better than others, and these should be identified and communicated.

One of the universally beneficial features of digital audio is metadata. While specific schema will vary widely, all digital audio should include technical metadata about the production of the audio, descriptive metadata about the content of the audio, and structural metadata about the relationships between audio files and related objects. Standardization of these metadata schemas encourages interoperability between organizations and facilitates access and future data curation and migration.

One of the best ways to ensure interoperability, in metadata and beyond, is to use and promote software and tools that adhere to established standards. Some commercial software and tools are built with this functionality, and some can be modified or extended to permit it. Open source software is sometimes more flexible than commercial. This recommendation may seem to apply only to software engineers, but managers and archivists must be aware of these considerations and choose tools with them in mind.

Not all digital audio is transferred from analog carriers. In recent years, digital recording has mostly replaced analog technologies, and some digital audio is produced entirely in the digital realm (electronic music, MIDI, etc.). These files are often considered to be at equal risk to those on deteriorating analog media because of the lack of standardization, and obsolescence of proprietary software used to produce the recordings. Awareness of these issues among archives and promotion of awareness among musicians and producers may help identify which formats will require attention, and prompt research into emulating legacy software or migrating proprietary data.

=== Promoting broad public access for educational purposes ===
This section begins to address the ways in which preservation is interdependent with access. Complicated intellectual property laws prevent audio archives from making most recordings publicly available, and funding agencies are reluctant to fund initiatives that don't improve access to materials. The following recommendations seek to improve public access to information that can be legally distributed, advocate for copyright reform, and streamline legal avenues for access to copyrighted works for educational use.

==== Discovery and cataloging initiatives ====
Widespread public access to recordings is an admirable goal for archives, but is unrealistic in most cases considering current copyright policy. There are many ways that archives can improve access to their collections, however, without risking legal action or offense to rights holders.

Recommendation 3.1 suggests the development and consolidation of discographies into a comprehensive national discography that would simplify the tracking of rights ownership. Although many decades of research have produced satisfactory discographies of individual record labels and musical forms, consolidation could improve usefulness through standardization, community annotation, and interoperability with existing collection catalogs and finding aids. Inclusion of commercially published discographies will be licensed with their respective publishers.

If a consolidated discography would bring together all published recordings into a single resource, a national directory of existing sound collections might compile information about existing collections at a fraction of the time, expense and effort of the discography. Audio holdings in existing collections, and even entire audio collections can be completely invisible to scholars without representation or community involvement. Recommendation 3.2 requests a directory of existing collections of all types, contact information for representatives, and descriptions of subject or format strengths. This directory may help facilitate partnerships as described in recommendation 2.3.

Just as standardized metadata helps people discover digital audio objects (recommendation 2.5), cataloging libraries' and archives' holdings of physical audio objects (and related materials) helps their respective constituents discover their materials better. Copy (shared) cataloging between institutions requires a consensus on what information must be included in a catalog record. This discussion should be undertaken publicly, and the results shared and distributed as best practices.

==== Copyright legislation reform ====
"Copyright reform...remains the key solution to preserving America's recorded sound history, protecting ownership rights, and providing public access"

American copyright laws about sound recordings are uniquely restrictive compared to American copyright laws for other formats and international copyright laws about sound recordings. In addition to preventing access, existing laws sometimes prohibit the preservation of deteriorating carrier objects until the object has audibly degraded. Recommendation 3.4 recognizes the need for federal copyright coverage of sound recordings committed before February 1972. The federal copyright code does not address sound recordings made before 15 Feb. 1972, which means that the legal status of their use and reproduction is in "limbo" - decided by a complex network of state laws and court decisions. Federalization of copyright for these recordings would clarify their status, and potentially initiate conversations about reformatting and academic use. The recommendation also suggests that copyright protection for recordings require reasonable market availability.

If the copyright owner of a recording cannot be identified or located, recommendation 3.5 suggests that it be considered an 'orphan work', reducing the liability of institutions who choose to distribute it in good faith after a reasonable search. This recommendation works in tandem with 3.4 in that federalization of sound recording copyrights would allow the 'orphan work' designation to apply uniformly to such recordings without being subject to contradictory state laws and court decisions.

Section 108 of the US copyright code allows the preservation reformatting of deteriorating sound recordings under specific conditions. The study group appointed by the Library of Congress and US Copyright Office to evaluate the section concluded that these conditions are outdated and overly restrictive, and recommendation 3.6 of this plan suggests ways to modernize the code to allow for better preservation and access in the academic realm. These recommendations include:

- Expand eligibility to pre-1972 recordings.
- Expand eligibility of protection beyond libraries and archives to include other nonprofit organizations and vendors working on behalf of nonprofits.
- Allow more than three copies (as appropriate), and allow reformatting before recording has already perceptibly deteriorated.
- Expand a library's right to distribute reproductions of sound recordings beyond news content at a user's request, provided it is not reasonably commercially available.
- Expand the definition of 'adjunct works', as described in subsection 108(i) to allow them to deliver related content along with requested audio.
- Allow virtual (i.e. streaming) access copies to be made available, instead of requiring that a researched physically visit the library or archive.
- Increase the term of access to commercially unavailable works that remain under copy protection to the last 45 years of their term if they were produced before 1961, where previously subsection 108(h) allowed this availability in the last 20 years.

==== Improving legal public access ====
This section addresses the ways in which innovative licensing agreements can expand scholarly access to copyrighted recordings.

Recommendation 3.7 encourages archives to work with rights holders to license rare out-of-print recordings for streaming on the web. This would allow archives to share their holdings without risking a lawsuit, and record labels to monetize their properties without the cost and effort of producing a formal reissue.

Recommendation 3.8 theorizes a shared network of digital audio files representing transfers of commercial recordings. Similar to copy cataloging, this model would allow archives to share the effort of digitizing collections. A similar model for paper holdings has been successful in recent years. The next recommendation suggests the need for a shared database of label ownership information. This would clarify whether a recording could be considered an orphan work (and therefore shareable), and would avoid a situation described in recommendation 3.7 whereby archives self-impose restrictions on access to avoid infringing on rights holders' interests.

Recommendation 3.10 challenges the Library of Congress, the United States' largest collection of sound recordings, to find new ways to make their immense collection more accessible. One proposed solution involves building additional research centers to allow for in-person listening without sometimes prohibitive travel to the Library of Congress.

The final recommendation of this section challenges institutions interested in sharing audio holdings to work with representatives of rights holders to build a consensus on the application of the fair use doctrine, and to publish a guide of best practices based on their findings.

=== Long-term national strategies ===
This final section reflects on the recommendations of the previous three, and addresses the larger practical challenges in accomplishing these goals.

The first recommendation of this section, 4.1, charges the National Recording Preservation Board with the task of coordinating the activities recommended by this document. These activities include aiding preservation work by other institutions, promoting public understanding of the board and foundation's goals, developing fundraising campaigns, and forming committees to report on the more specialized tasks.

The next recommendation charges the board with the creation of an advisory committee composed of heads of archives and recording industry executives to work together to accomplish the goals of the plan and resolve conflicts between affected parties.

Recommendation 4.3 requests the development of a national collections policy, and suggests a few formats and genres to be considered, including local radio programs, recordings published only in digital form, recordings published by small independent record labels, neglected and emerging formats, and corporate records on the production of sound recordings.

The next recommendation addresses recordings whose licensing agreements could interfere with their archiving. This includes recordings that are only available to stream, or downloads that are licensed for personal use only. Suggestions for improvement are educational clauses in existing license to allow formal archiving or coordinating with publishers to write separate licenses for archiving.

Recommendation 4.5 recognizes that the goals prescribed by the plan are expensive to undertake, and that current funding is inadequate. The authors go on to suggest several ways in which funding could be expanded, including partnerships with music industry stakeholders, online audio sales merchants or recording artists and new campaigns to make audio preservation more visible to traditional funding agencies,

The final recommendation of the plan, 4.6, calls for the periodic assessment of the progress made by the board, the foundation, and the greater community of audio preservation professionals through a conference or meetings.
