= Jim Henry =

Jim Henry may refer to:

== Sports ==
- Jim Henry (baseball) (1910–1976), Major League Baseball player
- Jim Henry (diver) (born 1948), former American Olympic diver
- Jim Henry (equestrian) (born 1947), Canadian Olympic equestrian
- Jim Henry (footballer, born 1949), Scottish footballer with Dundee United, Aberdeen and Forfar
- Jim Henry (footballer, born 1975), Scottish footballer with Montrose, Clyde and Forfar
- Jim Henry (ice hockey) (1920–2004), National Hockey League goalie
- Jim Henry (coach), former head coach of La Salle Explorers football, 1940–1941

== Politics ==
- Jim Henry (Tennessee politician) (born 1945), American politician from Tennessee
- Jim Henry (Iowa politician) (1896–1997), American politician from Iowa
- Jim Henry, candidate in the 1981 Manitoba general election

== Other ==
- Jim Henry (bandit), one of the leaders of the Mason Henry Gang in California in the American Civil War 1864–1865
- Jim Henry (musician), American folk singer
- Jim Henry (singer), bass singer of the barbershop quartets Gas House Gang and Crossroads
- Jim Henry, host of long-running local children's television show, Canyon Kid's Corner

== See also ==
- James Henry (disambiguation)
