= Charles J. Henry =

American librarian (born 1950)

Charles J. Henry (born June 17, 1950) is President of the Council on Library and Information Resources (CLIR), located in Washington, D. C. Prior to that he served as Vice Provost and University Librarian at Rice University, where he also served as Vice President and Chief Information Officer for several years.

== Early life and education ==
Henry was born in Washington, D.C., and moved around the United States continually during childhood and as a young adult, the son of a federal agent. He received a B.A. in philosophy and humanities from Northwest Missouri State University, and earned graduate degrees (M.A., M.Phil, Ph.D) from Columbia University. Henry studied for three years at Middlebury College’s Bread Loaf School of English. He was a recipient of a Fulbright Scholarship to Vienna, Austria, and received Fulbright Senior Scholar grants more recently to New Zealand and China, and has received numerous scholarships and awards during his career.

== Career ==
Henry began his professional career at Columbia University, serving as Assistant Director for the Humanities and History Division of the university libraries. Much of the focus during those years (1985–91) was on the integration of digital technology into library services and procedures, as well as the rise of computers in teaching, learning, and research in the humanities. He was then appointed as library director for the Vassar College Libraries (1991–96), working with the faculty and staff on the introduction of new services and the requisite skills of the new generation of professional information service provider. Redesigning and expanding the library, and the shifting concept of a library in an information era, were key areas of his responsibilities. He was appointed university librarian to Rice University (1996–2007) for a decade, and CIO for several years during his tenure. At Rice, Henry inaugurated the digital library project; developed new media services; fundraised extensively for the capital campaign; restarted the Rice University Press as an all-digital publisher; and directed major renovation projects and off-site storage facility planning and construction. He was also responsible for network security, telecommunications, web services, and research computing. He held a faculty appointment in the School of Engineering and taught in the School of Humanities.

Henry joined CLIR in 2007, and was responsible for fundraising, program development, strategic planning, and the Council’s array of projects including: those devoted to leadership in higher education, cyberinfrastructure, emerging disciplines, and the Digital Library Federation.

For over two decades, Henry has published and given talks focused on a variety of topics in higher education: the evolution of the humanities in a digital era, the organization of information and its support of teaching and research, the concept of a library, and the emerging digital environment for higher education in the United States. His work ranges from early exploration of cognitive aspects of reading ancient literature, to explorations in the changing organization of disciplines, and emerging methodologies in the conduct of research. Henry is an author of Our Cultural Commonwealth, a study of cyberinfrastructure in the humanities. Recent scholarship has focused on new models of scholarly communication and publishing.

Henry serves on several boards, including the Advisory Board for the new Tan Tao University in Vietnam; the Center for Research Libraries; the Center for Jewish History; and the National Institute for Technology in the Liberal Education. He was also a member of the advisory board for Jacobs University in Bremen, Germany (information resources and technology). Henry also serves as a Dean of the Frye Leadership Institute. There are a number of extant web interviews that express his ideas and opinions on a variety of topics.

== Personal life ==
Henry is married to Nancy C. Todd. The family home is in Northern Vermont.
