= Henry Paul =

Henry Paul may refer to:

- Henry Howard Paul (1830–1905), American writer, playwright, comic actor and theatrical manager
- Henry Paul (singer) (born 1949), American southern rock and country singer/songwriter
- Henry Paul (rugby) (born 1974), New Zealand international rugby league and England international rugby union player

== See also ==
- Henri Paul (died 1997), driver in the accident leading to the death of Diana, Princess of Wales
- Henry Paull (1824–1898), British Conservative Party politician and barrister
- Henry St Paul (1777–1820), British Army officer and politician
- Paul Henry (disambiguation)
