= Council on Library and Information Resources =

American non-profit organization

- Abbreviation: CLIR
- Formation: May 1956; 70 years ago
- Type: Non-profit; NGO
- Headquarters: Alexandria, Virginia, US
- Region served: United States
- Members: 183
- President: Charles Henry
- Budget: $11 million
- Staff: 17
- Website: www.clir.org

The Council on Library and Information Resources (CLIR) is an American independent, nonprofit organization. It works with libraries, cultural institutions, and higher learning communities on developing strategies to improve research, teaching, and learning environments. It is based in Alexandria, Virginia, United States. CLIR is supported primarily by annual dues from its over 180 sponsoring institutions and 190 DLF members, and by foundation grants and individual donations.

CLIR is overseen by a 21-member board of directors.

== Programs ==
Through its work, CLIR aims to cultivate cross-disciplinary intellectual leadership, create professional development opportunities, and promote best practices for the preservation, organization, and accessibility of information. The following are among CLIR's major programs.

=== Digital Library Federation ===
The Digital Library Federation (DLF) is a community of practitioners who advance research, learning, social justice, and the public good through the creative design and wise application of digital library technologies. It is the place where CLIR's broader information-community strategies are informed and enriched by digital library practice. DLF's activities are guided by the DLF Advisory Committee, which includes five members of CLIR's board of directors.

=== Digitizing Hidden Special Collections and Archives ===
Digitizing Hidden Special Collections and Archives is a national competition for digitizing collections of rare and unique content in cultural memory institutions. In 2021, CLIR awarded nearly $4 million to institutions holding collections of high scholarly value. In 2022, the number was about the same. The program is supported by The Andrew W. Mellon Foundation.

By the grant that CLIR provided on the program "'The Animal Turn': Digitizing Animal Protection and Human-Animal Studies Collections" ASPCA (American Society for the Prevention of Cruelty to Animals) digitized a curated collection of more than 150,000 pages of archival material, including annual reports, journals, scrapbooks, photos, and publications that provide a timeline of the work and influence of the ASPCA since its founding on April 10, 1866.

=== Postdoctoral Fellowship Program ===
CLIR Postdoctoral Fellows work on projects that forge and strengthen connections among library collections, educational technologies, and current research. The program offers recent PhD graduates the chance to help develop research tools, resources, and services while exploring new career opportunities. Host institutions benefit from fellows' field-specific expertise by gaining insights into their collections' potential uses and users, scholarly information behaviors, and current teaching and learning practices within particular disciplines.

=== Mellon Fellowships for Dissertation Research in Original Sources ===
CLIR offers about 15 fellowships annually to support original-source doctoral dissertation research in the humanities or related social sciences.

=== Leading Change Institute ===
In partnership with EDUCAUSE, CLIR organizes the annual Leading Change Institute (LCI). LCI aims to prepare and develop the next generation of leaders in libraries, information services, and higher education by engaging those who seek to further develop their skills for the benefit of higher education.

=== Committee on Coherence at Scale for Higher Education ===
The Committee on Coherence at Scale for Higher Education was formed in 2012 to examine emerging national-scale digital projects and their potential to help transform higher education in terms of scholarly productivity, teaching, cost-efficiency, and sustainability. Committee members include college and university presidents and provosts, deans, university librarians, and association heads.

== Publications ==
CLIR produces a variety of print and web-based publications, most notably the Burgundy Reports, which are substantive reports on topics relating to digital libraries, economics of information, long-term access to information, and the future of the library and its leadership. CLIR publications also include CLIR Issues, a bimonthly newsletter covering topics related to CLIR's agenda; and the blog Re: Thinking. The full text of most CLIR publications is available on the CLIR website.

== History ==
CLIR resulted from the merger of the Commission on Preservation and Access (CPA) and the Council on Library Resources (CLR) in 1997. Planning for the merger began in 1995, with the appointment of Deanna B. Marcum as the president of both organizations by their respective boards. Following the merger, Marcum served as president of CLIR until 2003. She was succeeded by Richard Detweiler, who served as interim director until the appointment of Nancy Davenport in June 2004. Davenport left CLIR in 2006 and was succeeded by Charles Henry.

=== Council on Library Resources ===
Established in 1956 with a $5 million grant from the Ford Foundation, the Council on Library Resources (CLR) was an independent coordinating body that aimed to address common problems faced by libraries in an era of explosive library growth and the emergence of new technologies. Louis B. Wright, the director of the Folger Shakespeare Library, was a principal figure in the organization's founding. Verner Clapp, then the Deputy Librarian of Congress, was named the first president, and served until 1967.

CLR subsequently received further grants from the Ford Foundation, amounting to $31.5 million by 1983; and, beginning in 1978, also received funding from a variety of other sources, including the Carnegie Corporation of New York, the National Endowment for the Humanities, and the Pew Memorial Trust. CLR's own grant-making activities focused on increasing library cooperation, supporting the application of technological developments to library needs, and conducting research on library problems. It funded programs to improve nationwide bibliographic access and services, to support collection development, and to develop strategies for the preservation of library materials.

=== Commission on Preservation and Access ===
The Commission on Preservation and Access (CPA) was established as a permanent body in 1986. It had its beginnings in the work of a task force on preservation and access that was one of several task forces formed jointly by the Association of American Universities and the Council on Library Resources, under the leadership of CLR president Warren J. Haas, who took office in 1978. Haas, who had previously headed the Columbia University Libraries, was particularly attuned to the problem of the deteriorating condition of books and journals in library collections, and, in 1972, in response to failed efforts of the Association of Research Libraries to formulate a plan for collective action, had articulated recommendations for a national preservation program.

Haas served as interim chair of the newly formed Commission, until the appointment of Patricia Battin as its first president in August 1987.

=== National Digital Library Federation ===
A group of librarians working on projects to test the feasibility of using digital technology for preservation urged CPA to coordinate activities of a small but growing group of libraries that shared digital interests. The Digital Library Federation (DLF) grew out of informal discussions among eight librarians (the LaGuardia Eight, named after the meeting site at LaGuardia Airport). The group soon comprised 12 institutions that were committed to looking at the broader implications of digital technology. In 1994, the group called for a planning strategy for the development of digital libraries and began to organize themselves to continue local efforts while also sharing their findings.

At about the same time, LC announced its intention to create a national digital library. To ensure that their activities would be compatible with those of LC, the consortium asked LC and the National Archives to join in a new effort—the National Digital Library Federation. The CPA continued to serve as the administrative home for the group, whose name was soon shortened to Digital Library Federation.

== See also ==
- National Recording Preservation Plan
