= Paul Henry =

Paul Henry may refer to:

== People ==
=== Given name "Paul" surname "Henry" ===
- Paul Henry (astronomer) (1848–1905), French optician and astronomer
- Paul Henry (painter) (1876–1958), Irish artist
- Paul Henry (Belgian footballer) (1912–1989), Belgian footballer
- Paul B. Henry (1942–1993), U.S. Congressman and political scientist
- Paul Henry (actor) (born 1946), British actor best known for his role in Crossroads
- Paul Henry (poet) (born 1959), Welsh poet
- Paul Henry (broadcaster) (born 1960), New Zealand broadcaster
- Paul Henry (cricketer) (born 1970), New Zealand cricketer
- Paul Henry (English footballer) (born 1988), English footballer

=== Given name "Paul-Henry" ===
- Paul-Henry de Belvèze (1801–1875), French sailor and diplomat
- Paul-Henry Chombart de Lauwe (1913–1998), French sociologist
- Paul-Henry Thiry, Baron d'Holbach (1723–1789), Franco-German philosopher
- Paul-Henry Nargeolet (1946–2023), French submariner and RMS Titanic expert

== Other ==
- Paul Henry (TV programme), a New Zealand morning news and talk show with broadcaster Paul Henry
  - The Paul Henry Show, an early version of the show

== See also ==
- Henry Paul (disambiguation)
