= Justice Henry =

Justice Henry may refer to:

- J. L. Henry (1831–1907), associate justice of the Texas Supreme Court
- James Henry (Continental Congress) (1731–1804), associate justice of the Supreme Court of Appeals of Virginia
- Joe W. Henry (1916–1980), associate justice of the Tennessee Supreme Court
- John Ward Henry (1825–1902), associate justice of the Supreme Court of Missouri
- William Alexander Henry (1816–1888), puisne justice of the Supreme Court of Canada
- Winder Laird Henry (1864–1940), chief judge of the First Judicial Circuit of Maryland
