= Jim Henry (footballer, born 1975) =

Scottish footballer

Personal information
- Full name: James Henry
- Date of birth: 7 July 1975 (age 51)
- Place of birth: Dundee, Scotland
- Position: Midfielder

Senior career*
| Years | Team | Apps | (Gls) |
| 1997–1998 | Montrose | 35 | (1) |
| 1998–2000 | Lochee United | | |
| 2000–2001 | Clyde | 11 | (1) |
| 2001 | Stenhousemuir | 3 | (0) |
| 2001–2002 | Forfar Athletic | 22 | (0) |
| 2002–2003 | Carnoustie Panmure | | |
| 2003 | Raith Rovers | 3 | (0) |
| 2003–2005 | Tayport | | |
- * Club domestic league appearances and goals as of 17:38, 8 January 2009 (UTC)

James Henry (born 7 July 1975) is a Scottish former football midfielder.

Henry began his career with Montrose. He spent a season and a half at Links Park, before dropping down to the junior leagues with Lochee United. He returned to senior football in the summer of 2000, signing for Clyde. Henry never cemented his place as a first team regular at Clyde, and joined Stenhousemuir in March 2001. He went on to play for Forfar Athletic and Raith Rovers before returning to the juniors.
