= Bill Henry (footballer) =

Australian rules footballer

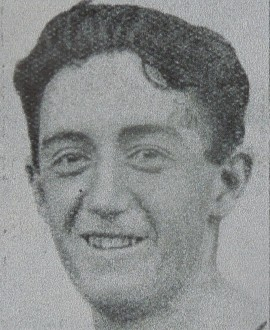
- Henry in 1925

Personal information
- Full name: William Herbert Henry
- Born: 25 November 1904; Ballarat East, Victoria
- Died: 19 August 1974 (aged 69); Oakleigh, Victoria
- Original team: Camberwell
- Height: 180 cm (5 ft 11 in)
- Weight: 79 kg (174 lb)

Playing career^{1}
Years	Club	Games (Goals)
1925	Collingwood	2 (0)
1926–1927	Hawthorn	8 (5)
1928	Essendon	9 (20)
1929	Yarraville (VFA)	17 (38)
1930–1931	Oakleigh (VFA)	7 (8)
- ^{1} Playing statistics correct to the end of 1931.

William Herbert Henry (25 November 1904 – 19 August 1974) was an Australian rules footballer who played with Collingwood, Hawthorn and Essendon in the Victorian Football League (VFL).

== Early life ==
The son of James Henry (1864–1948) and Annie Henry, nee Poole (1873–1908), William Herbert Henry was born 25 November 1904 at Ballarat East.

== Football ==
A forward, Bill Henry joined Collingwood from Camberwell/Surrey Hills in 1925 but struggled to make the team, making only two senior appearances.

Henry subsequently transferred to Hawthorn for two seasons, making a further eight appearances, before transferring to Essendon for the 1928 VFL season.

In 1929, Henry played for Yarraville in the Victorian Football Association and then in 1930 transferred to Oakleigh where he finished his senior playing career.

Henry later served as secretary of the Oakleigh Football Club for many years.

== Death ==
Bill Henry died in Oakleigh, Victoria at the age of 69 and was cremated at Springvale Botanical Cemetery in Springvale, Victoria.
