= Alexander Henry =

Alexander Henry may refer to:

- Alexander Henry the elder (1739–1834), fur trader and entrepreneur
- Alexander Henry the younger (c. 1765–1814), fur-trader, nephew of the above
- Alexander Henry (gun maker) (1818–1894), Scottish gunsmith
- Alexander Henry (Philadelphia) (1823–1883), American politician
- Alex Henry (born 1979), Canadian ice hockey player
- Alexander Henry (MP) (1783–1862), British member of parliament for South Lancashire, 1847–1852
- CCGS Alexander Henry, a Canadian Coast Guard light icebreaker and buoy tender
