= William Henry (pastor) =

Scottish pastor

The Reverend William Henry
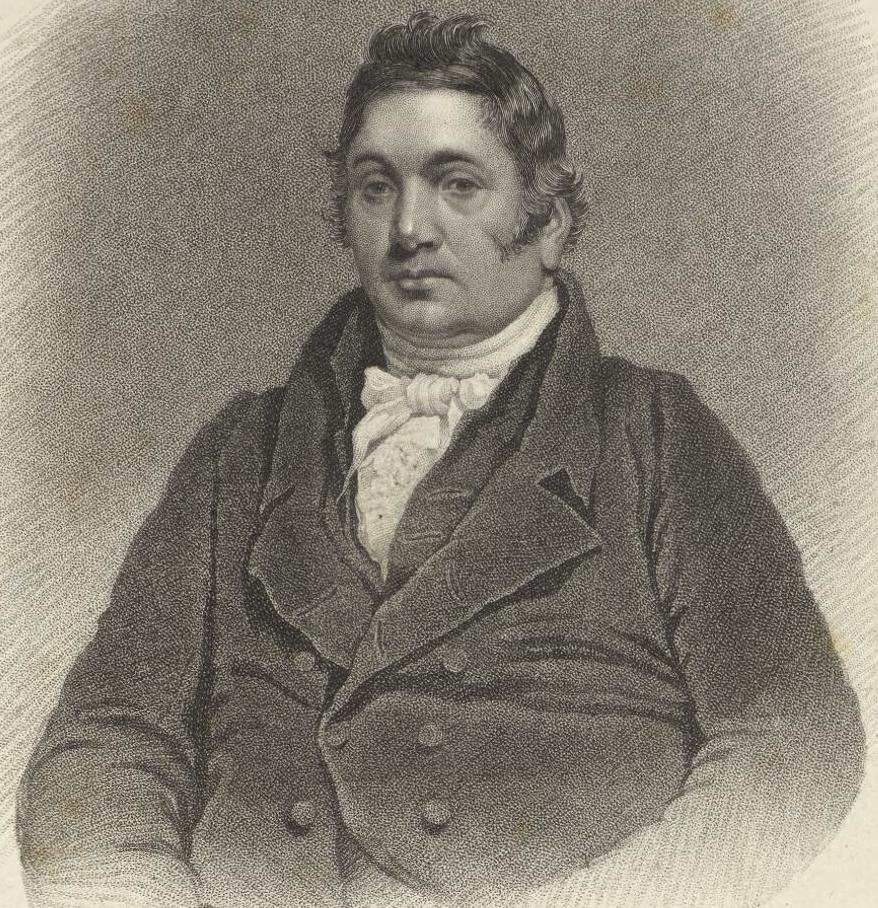
- Rev. William Henry, 1826
- Born: 22 April 1783; Kirkintilloch, near Glasgow
- Died: 8 March 1839 (aged 55); Tooting, Greater London
- Parent(s): John Henry and Agnes McEwan

Ecclesiastical career
- Church: Congregational Church
- Ordained: 1808
- Offices held: Corresponding Secretary, Home Missionary Society

William Henry (22 April 1783 – 8 March 1839) was a Scottish-born Congregationalist pastor who ministered in Stirling and Leith in Scotland, and at Tooting in England. He also held the position of Corresponding Secretary of the Home Missionary Society.

== Early life ==
He was born in Kirkintilloch, near Glasgow, Scotland to John and Agnes Henry. William's father was a grocer, as well as a deacon of the Independent church in Kirkintilloch.

When aged around 17, William began a four-year course of study at Edinburgh to train for Christian ministry. These studies were made possible by theologian Robert Haldane, who set up and financially supported religious training seminars in Glasgow, Edinburgh and Dundee. Partway through his studies, William removed to Glasgow and completed his course there, while occasionally acting as an assistant to a Reverend Mr Ewing.

== Career ==
In 1808, William was ordained pastor of the Congregational church at Stirling, where he remained for eight years. Following this, he took up ministerial duties in Leith. There, he also engaged in open-air preaching, and had a particular interest in promoting the spiritual welfare of sailors: he was instrumental in obtaining a floating chapel for their use.

He also became the Corresponding Secretary of the Home Missionary Society for many years, and became widely known to the religious public through his office at that institution.

In 1822 he was unanimously invited by the Congregational church at Tooting to be their minister, and he remained connected to that church until his death.

== Death ==
In 1830, William was attacked by an illness which seriously damaged his health. From about two years later, bouts of infirmity became more severe, forcing him to lay aside his duties for much of the time. He died on the 8th March 1839, and his remains were interred in the burial ground adjoining the chapel at Tooting on the 15th March. The funeral service was conducted by the Rev. George Clayton, and on the Sunday following a funeral sermon in William Henry's honour was given by the Rev. John Leifchild.

== Miscellaneous ==
- William's Obituary in the August 1839 edition of The Evangelical Magazine and Missionary Chronicle mis-states his year of birth as 1784. The correct year, 1783, is given by the Church of Scotland Old Parish Registers, searchable at www.scotlandspeople.gov.uk.
- This William Henry (1783–1839, Scottish) is sometimes confused with a contemporaneous clergyman of the same name, William Henry (1770–1859, Irish). This confusion has also occurred at WikiMedia, which has a copy of a portrait from the Welsh Portrait Collection at the National Library of Wales that clearly contains the label "William Henry, Tooting, 1826" but which is mistakenly described as being "William Henry – Irish preacher, active in Tahiti and New South Wales, Australia (1770–1859)."

== Sources ==
- Kinniburgh, Robert, Fathers of Independency in Scotland, or Biographical Sketches of early Scottish Congregational Ministers A.D. 1798-1851 (Jan 1851, A. Fullarton & Company).
