= Bill Henry (comptroller) =

American politician

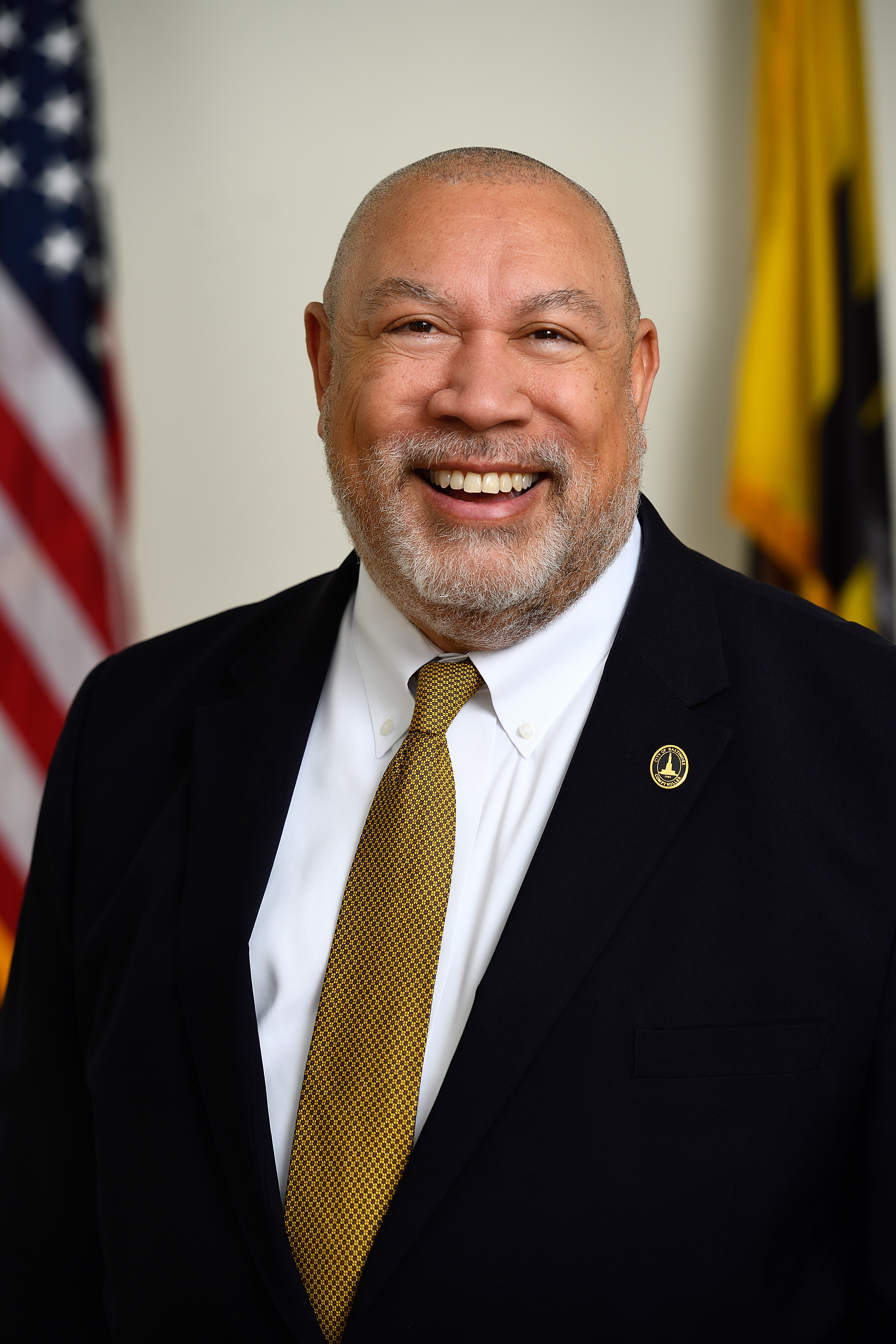

Comptroller of Baltimore
- Incumbent
- Assumed office December 8, 2020
- Preceded by: Joan Pratt

Member of the Baltimore City Council from District 4
- In office December 6, 2007 – December 8, 2020
- Preceded by: Keiffer J. Mitchell Jr.
- Succeeded by: Mark Conway

Personal details
- Born: William Bill Henry; August 2, 1968 (age 58) Baltimore, Maryland, U.S.
- Party: Democratic
- Education: Johns Hopkins University (BA); Loyola University Maryland (MBA)
- Website: https://www.baltimorecity.gov/comptroller/staff/bill-henry

Bill Henry is an American politician serving as the Comptroller of Baltimore City since December 2020. Before being elected Comptroller, Henry represented Baltimore's Fourth District on the Baltimore City Council from 2007 to 2020.

== Early life and education ==
Bill Henry was born in Baltimore, Maryland on August 2, 1968. His father was active in the Civil rights movement. He entered an honors program in Loyola-Blakefield High School before attending Krieger School of Arts and Sciences.

Henry received a bachelor's degree in social and behavioral sciences, with concentrations in urban studies and public policy. He later earned a Master of Business Administration (MBA) with a concentration in finance from Loyola University Maryland.

== Career ==
=== Baltimore City Council ===
Henry was elected to the Baltimore City Council in 2007 to represent the Fourth District. He won reelection in 2016, defeating Brian W. Hammock and Republican William "Sam" Broaddus III.

=== Baltimore City Comptroller ===
Henry was elected Baltimore City Comptroller in the 2020 general election and assumed office in December 2020.

== Elections ==
=== 2020 ===
In September 2019, Henry announced his candidacy for Baltimore City Comptroller, challenging incumbent Joan Pratt, who had held the office since 1995.

Henry won the Democratic party's primary election on June 8, 2020, defeating Pratt. He was sworn into office on December 8, 2020.

In the 2020 primary, he received 74,135 votes (54.7%), compared to Pratt's 61,388. In the 2020 general election, he received 206,919 votes (98.7%), compared to the 2,684 for "other write-ins".

=== 2024 ===
Henry sought a second term as Baltimore City Comptroller in the 2024 election. He was unopposed in both the Democratic primary and the general election, and was re-elected to a second term.

In the 2024 primary, he received 74,131 votes (100%). In the 2024 general election, he received 171,993 votes (98.87%), with 1,972 for "write-ins".
