= James S. Henry =

American economist, lawyer, and investigative journalist

James S. Henry is an American economist, lawyer, and investigative journalist. He is an Edward R. Murrow Fellow at Tufts University's Fletcher School of Law and Diplomacy and an INSPIRE Fellow at its Institute for Global Leadership. Henry has written extensively on the problems of financial secrecy, capital flight, tax evasion, tax justice and developmental finance. Henry is, along with Nicholas Shaxson, a founding member and senior adviser of the Tax Justice Network.

== Early life ==
Henry was born in Minneapolis, Minnesota, and has a bachelor's degree from Harvard College, a JD from Harvard Law School, and a master's degree from Harvard Graduate School of Arts and Sciences.

== Career ==
Before James wrote Blood Bankers and founded technology and IT consulting firm, Sag Harbour, James was chief economist at McKinsey & Co.

== Publications ==
- The Blood Bankers: Tales from the Global Underground Economy (2005)
- Pirate Bankers: First-Hand Investigations of Private Banking, Capital Flight, Corruption, Money Laundering, Tax Evasion, Drug Trafficking, Organized Crime, Terror Banking, and the Continuing Global Development Crisis (2006)

== Personal life ==
Henry and his family live in New York City and Sag Harbor, New York.

== See also ==
- Financial effect of tax havens
