= David Henry (Australian footballer) =

Australian rules footballer

Personal information
- Full name: David Henry
- Born: 3 February 1956 (age 70)
- Original team: Beverley Hills
- Height: 191 cm (6 ft 3 in)
- Weight: 86 kg (190 lb)

Playing career^{1}
Years	Club	Games (Goals)
1976	Richmond	1 (0)
- ^{1} Playing statistics correct to the end of 1976.

David Henry (born 3 February 1956) is a former Australian rules footballer who played with Richmond in the Victorian Football League (VFL).
