= Charles Trumbo Henry =

American painter

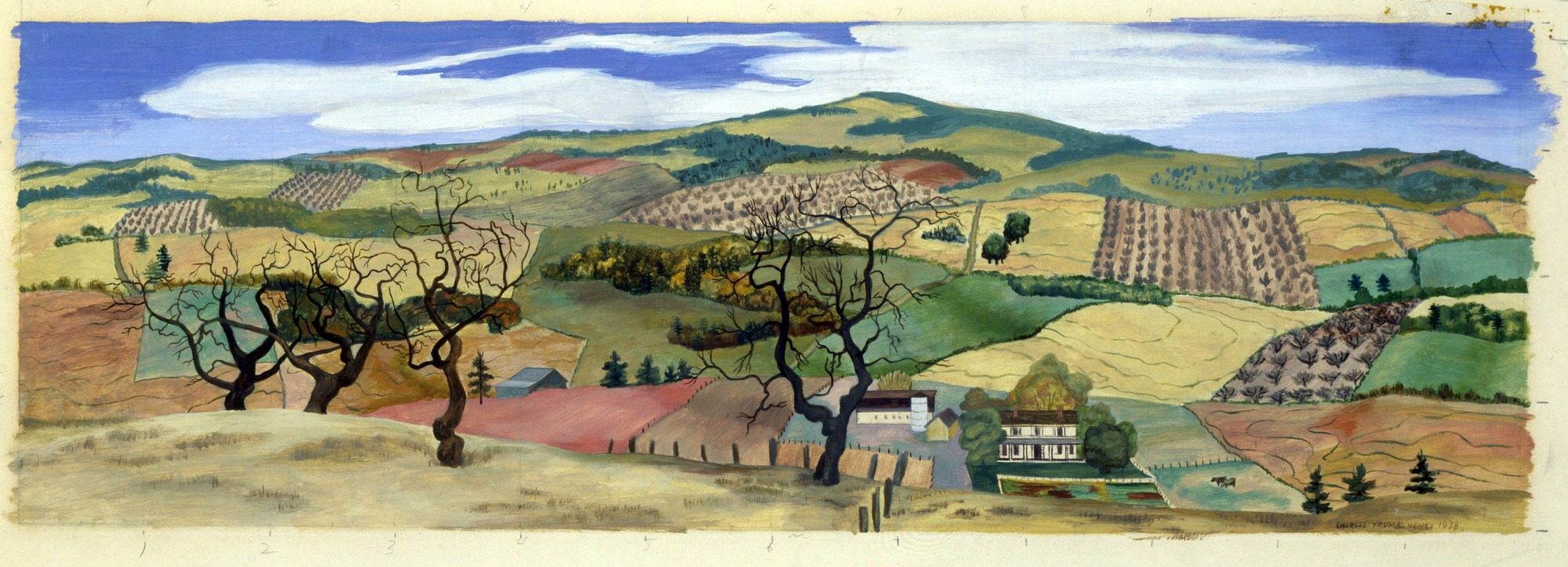
Study for Northern Georgia, Henry's post office mural in Cornelia, Georgia

Charles Trumbo Henry (1902–1964) was an American artist. His mural Northern Georgia (1939), an oil on canvas, was painted for the United States Post Office in Cornelia, Georgia, in a Treasury Department art program. He was born in Niagara Falls, New York. His works are held in the collections of the Brooklyn Museum of Art, Carnegie Museum of Art, Corcoran Gallery in Washington D.C., Metropolitan Museum of Art, Pennsylvania Academy of Fine Arts and Whitney Museum of American Art.

== Works ==
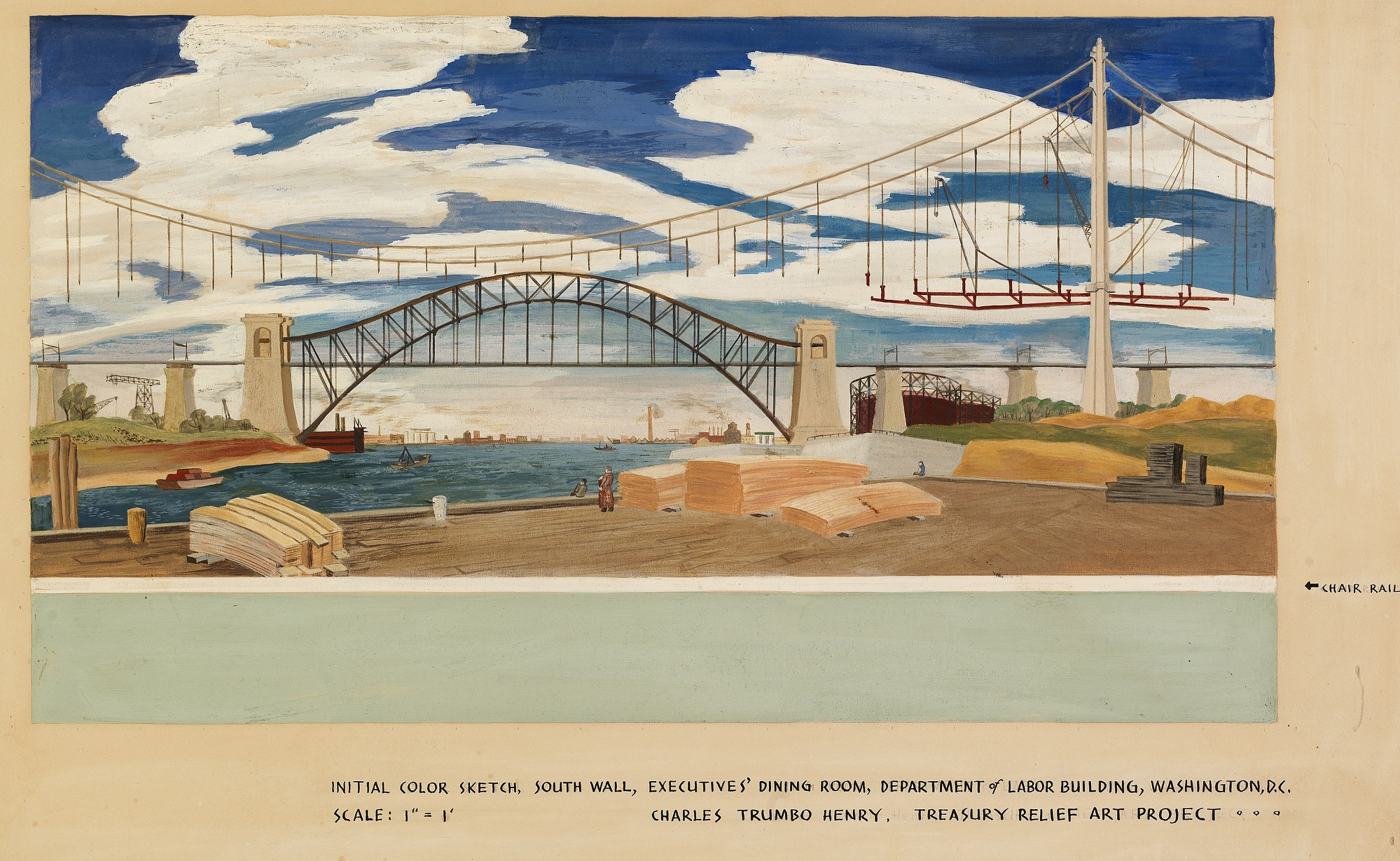
Aspects of the American Industrial Scene (1937), Treasury Relief Art Project mural study for the Department of Labor Building, Washington, D.C.

- Landscape mural study for the Cornelia Post Office (1938), tempera on paperboard held by the Smithsonian American Art Museum after a transfer from the Internal Revenue Service through the General Services Administration
- Aspects of the American Industrial Scene, a mural study for U.S. Department of Labor (1937) tempera on paperboard. At the Smithsonian American Art Museum after transfer from the General Services Administration
- Coal Yard and River
- Construction, Power, and Transportation (1938) at U.S. Customs and Immigration (formerly Department of Labor)
