= Robert Henry =

Robert or Rob Henry may refer to:

== Politicians ==
- Robert Pryor Henry (1788–1826), American politician, U.S. representative from Kentucky
- Robert Henry (Canadian politician) (1845–1918), Ontario legislator in House of Commons
- Robert L. Henry (1864–1931), American politician, U.S. representative from Texas
- Robert Kirkland Henry (1890–1946), American politician, U.S. representative from Wisconsin
- Robert C. Henry (1921–1981), American politician from Springfield, Ohio, first African-American city mayor
- Robert Harlan Henry (born 1953), American judge, politician, and president of Oklahoma City University

== Sportspeople ==
- Robert Henry (bowls) (1889/90–1954), New Zealand lawn bowls player
- Robert Henry (speedway rider) (born 1954), English motorcyclist and team manager
- Robert Henry Jr. (born 2001), American running back
- Rob Henry (American football) (born 1990), American safety and quarterback
- Bob Henry (shot putter) (born 1936), American shot putter, 1957 and 1958 All-American for the Minnesota Golden Gophers track and field team

== Others ==
- Robert Henry (minister) (1718–1790), Scottish historian
- Robert L. Henry Jr. (1882–?), American law professor
- Robert T. Henry (1923–1944), American soldier and World War II Medal of Honor recipient
- Robert Selph Henry (1889–1970), American lawyer, railroad executive and historian
- Robert 'Buzz' Henry (1931–1971), American actor and stuntman
- Rob Henry, past member of the Gas House Gang barbershop quartet

== See also ==
- Bobby Henry (1952–2011), Scottish guitarist, founding member of the band Bim
- Robert Henri (1865–1929), American painter
