= Digital Library Federation =

US library organization

Digital Library Federation (DLF)
- Founded: 1995; 31 years ago
- Type: Nonprofit
- Location: Alexandria, Virginia, US
- Parent organization: Council on Library and Information Resources
- Website: www.diglib.org

The Digital Library Federation (DLF) is a program of the Council on Library and Information Resources (CLIR) that brings together a consortium of academic and public libraries, museums, and related institutions. The DLF's stated mission "to advance research, learning, social justice, and the public good through the creative design and wise application of digital library technologies." It was formed in 1995.

== History ==
The Digital Library Federation was formed on May 1, 1995, by twelve academic libraries, the New York Public Library, US Library of Congress, US National Archives and Records Administration, and the Commission on Preservation and Access (CPA). The purpose of the organization was to create a distributed, open, digital library.

In September 1995, CPA received a nine-month planning grant from IBM for $100,000 on behalf of DLF to support the preparation of a technological and policy proposal with specific guidelines for creating and maintaining a national digital library.

Over the next nine months, DLF convened a Planning Task Force to establish working groups to consider the key technical, financial, and organizational issues to forming a national digital library, resulting in three areas of focus in which DLF could play a role in building a digital library infrastructure: discovery and retrieval, rights and economic models, and archiving. A report was issued to IBM on June 1, 1996.

Many of the DLF's early efforts formed around defining and elaborating technical architectures for digital libraries. This work focused on interoperability and metadata standards, and work was conducted intensively by the relatively small cadre of persons from the first institutions, most on a core "technical architecture committee" in DLF. For example, an early initiative led by one member of the committee, Bernie Hurley, was the articulation of an SGML DTD for encoding information about digital objects. That work, MOA2, ultimately evolved into METS. Similarly, in the area of interoperability, much of the early interest in interoperability moved form a focus on the Z39.50 protocol to work on Open Access Initiatives and OAI-PMH.

DLF began under the wing of the Council on Library and Information Resources, but spun off into its own group after a few years. It was absorbed back into CLIR in 2010.

== Organization ==
DLF has more than 130 members as of July 2026. Members include large research institutions, liberal arts colleges, academic and public libraries, museums, and cultural heritage organizations, most in North America. The Coalition for Networked Information (CNI), Metropolitan New York Library Council, Council of Independent Colleges, Jisc, ITHAKA, and other organizations are also members.

The program is staffed by employees of the Council on Library and Information Resources (CLIR). The DLF program is governed by the CLIR board and a DLF advisory committee drawn from member institutions. Most of the group's activities are conducted by fellows and staff from member institutions who volunteer to coordinate a particular project or plan forum activities.

== Programs and activities ==
=== General activities ===
DLF initiatives change with needs; as some projects come to fruition or find new support, the DLF invests in others, staying flexible as a catalyst for experiment and change. For example, the DLF has promoted work on the following:

- Digital library structures, standards, preservation, and use
- Archives for electronic journals
- Online collections for use in teaching
- Internet services that expand access to resources of use to scholars
- Assessments of the future roles of libraries.

=== Conferences ===
Forums are convened annually and include a number of digital library practitioners from the member institutions and elsewhere. The forums serve as meeting places, market places, and congresses. As meeting places they provide an opportunity for the DLF Board, advisory groups, initiatives to conduct their business and to present their work to the broader membership. As market places, they provide an opportunity for member organizations to share experiences and practices with one another and in this respect support a broader level of information sharing between professional staff. As congresses, Forums provide an opportunity for the DLF to continually review and assess its programs and its progress with input from the broader membership community.

=== Contributions ===
DLF has played a significant role in the origin or evolution of these digital library initiatives:

- ARTstor
- Archivists' Toolkit
- Cataloging Cultural Objects
- DLF/OCLC Registry of Digital Masters
- DPLA- Digital Public Library of America
- Global Digital Format Registry
- Making of America
- METS
- OCKHAM Initiative
- OAI
- SUSHI Protocol (ANSI/NISO Z39.93)
- TEI Lite
