= Stuart Henry (criminologist) =

British criminologist (born 1949)

Stuart Henry is professor emeritus, Criminal justice and former director of the School of Public Affairs, San Diego State University (2006–17). He has also been visiting professor of criminology at the University of Kent's School of Social Policy, Sociology and Social Research from 2008 to 2013 and visiting research scholar in sociology at the University of Hawaii, Manoa, 2017.

Henry was born in Lambeth, South London, England, on 18 October 1949. He studied sociology at the University of Kent at Canterbury from where he graduated with a PhD in 1976. From 1975 to 1978, he was a research sociologist at the Addiction Research Unit of the Institute of Psychiatry, University of London. From 1979 to 1983, he taught sociology of deviance and medical sociology at Trent Polytechnic (now Nottingham Trent University) while also conducting research at Middlesex Polytechnic (now Middlesex University in Northwest London). In December 1983 he moved to Old Dominion University in Virginia, United States.

Henry joined San Diego State University in 2006 after spending seven years as chair of the Department of Interdisciplinary Studies at Wayne State University in Detroit, where he also has served as associate dean of the College of Lifelong Learning (1999–2002). He spent 2010–11 as director of the Interdisciplinary Studies Program at the University of Texas, Arlington, before returning to San Diego in 2011. He has previously served as professor and chair of sociology at Valparaiso University (1998–99) and Professor of Criminology at Eastern Michigan University (1987–1998).

Henry teaches criminological theory, white-collar crime, school violence and deviant behaviour. He has conducted research on varieties of marginalised knowledge and informal institutions including: mutual aid groups, informal economies, non-state systems of discipline and social control, and cooperatives. Most recently, he examined the relationship between social norms, private discipline and public law. He has received grant funding from the British Social and Economic Research Council, the National Science Foundation and the Federal Emergency management Agency.

An internationally renowned criminologist, Henry has 34 books published and over one hundred of his articles have appeared in professional journals or as book chapters. His books are listed in the bibliography below. Henry has served on the editorial board of Theoretical Criminology and Critical Criminology, and was co-editor of the Western Criminology Review.

== Bibliography ==
=== Books authored or co-authored by Stuart Henry ===
- S. Henry and L. Howard. Social Deviance 3rd ed. Cambridge: Polity Press, 2026.
- S. Henry and D. Anastasia, Essential Criminology. 5th edition. Routledge. (first edition, 1998), 2025 .
- W. Einstadter and S. Henry, Criminological Theory: An Analysis of its Underlying Assumptions. 2nd edition. Lanham, MD: Rowman and Littlefield (1st edition, 1995, Fort Worth, TX: Harcourt, Brace and Company). 2006
- R. Cantor, S. Henry and S. Rayner, Markets, Distribution, and Exchange after Societal Cataclysm. New York: Books for Business (republication of 1989 research report to FEMA), 2001
- S. Henry and D. Milovanovic, Constitutive Criminology: Beyond Postmodernism. London: Sage, 1996.
- E. H. Pfuhl and S. Henry, The Deviance Process 3rd edition. New York: Aldine de Gruyter, 1993.
- R. Cantor, S. Henry and S. Rayner, Making Markets: An Interdisciplinary Perspective on Economic Exchange with a foreword by Amitai Etzioni, New York: Greenwood Press, 1992.
- S. Henry, Private Justice: Toward Integrated Theorizing in the Sociology of Law, London and New York: Routledge and Kegan Paul. 1983.
- S. Henry, The Hidden Economy: The Context and Control of Borderline Crime, Oxford: Martin Robertson,1978; republished by Loompanics Unlimited, Port Townsend, Washington, 1988.
- D. Robinson and S. Henry, Self-help and Health: Mutual Aid for Modern Problems, Oxford: Martin Robertson, 1977.

=== Books edited or co-edited by Stuart Henry ===
S. Henry and R. L. Matsueda eds), "Social Constructionist Theories of Crime,". London: Routledge, 2015.

- W. Muschert, S. Henry, N. L. Bracy, and A. A. Peguero. Responding to School Violence: Confronting the Columbine Effect. Boulder CO: Lynne Rienner, 2013.
- T. Augsburg and S. Henry (eds). The Politics of Interdisciplinary Studies: Essays on Transformations in American Undergraduate Programs. Jefferson, NC: McFarland, 2009.
- S. Henry and S. Lukas. (eds). Recent Developments in Criminological Theory. London: Ashgate, 2009.
- S. Henry and M. M. Lanier, eds., The Essential Criminology Reader. Boulder, CO: Westview/Perseus. 2006.
- R. A. Schindler and S. Henry (eds). Special AIS 25th Anniversary volume of Issues in Integrative Studies (Vol 21). Oxford, OH: Association of Integrative Studies. 2003.
- S. Henry and W. Hinkle (eds.) Careers in Criminal Justice: The Inside Story, 2nd Ed. Salem, WI: Sheffield Publishing Company. First edition, published as Inside Jobs, 1994. 2001
- S. Henry and M. Lanier. (eds.). What is Crime? Controversy over the Nature of Crime and What to do About it. Boulder CO: Rowman and Littlefield. 2001
- W. Hinkle and S. Henry (eds.). School Violence (The Annals of the American Academy of Political and Social Science, Vol 567), Thousand Oaks, CA: Sage. 2000
- S. Henry and D. Milovanovic (eds.), Constitutive Criminology at Work: Applications to Crime and Punishment. New York: SUNY Press, 1999.
- S. Henry and R. Eaton (eds.), Degrees of Deviance: Student Accounts of their Deviant Behavior, Salem, Wisconsin: Sheffield Publishing, 2nd edition. (First published, 1990). 1999
- S. Henry and W. Einstadter (eds.), The Criminology Theory Reader, New York University Press. 1998
- S. Henry, (ed.). Employee Dismissal: Justice at Work (The Annals of the American Academy of Political and Social Science, vol 536). Thousand Oaks, CA: Sage. 1994
- S. Henry (ed) Social Control: Aspects of Non-State Justice, Brookfield, VT: Dartmouth. 1994
- L. A. Ferman, L. E. Berndt and S. Henry (eds.). Work Beyond Employment in Advanced Capitalist Countries: Classic and Contemporary Perspectives on the Informal Economy, Vol I: Concepts, Evidence and Measurement; Volume II: Revisions and Criticism. Lewiston, NY: The Edwin Mellen Press. 1993
- L. Ferman, S. Henry and M. Hoyman (eds.). The Informal Economy, (The Annals of the American Academy of Political and Social Science, volume 493), Newbury Park: Sage. 1987
- S. Henry (ed.). Informal Institutions: Alternative Systems in the Corporate State, New York: St. Martin's Press, 1981. Also published as Can I Have It in Cash?, London: Astragal, 1981

=== Works about Stuart Henry ===
- Cowling, M. (2006) Postmodern Policies? The Erratic Interventions of Constitutive Criminology. Internet Journal of Criminology. https://web.archive.org/web/20111001101317/http://www.internetjournalofcriminology.com/Cowling%20-%20Postmodern%20Policies.pdf
- Itzkowitz, Gary 'Social Theory and Law: The Significance of Stuart Henry', Law and Society Review, 22/5(1988): 949–63.
- Harrington, Christine, 1988 "Moving from Integrative to Constitutive Theories of Law: Comments on Itzkowitz." Law and Society Review 22 (1988): 963–967.
