= David Eugene Henry =

American painter and sculptor

- Born: December 10, 1946; Rome, Georgia, U.S.
- Known for: Sculpture, Painting, Figure Drawing
- Website: davidhenryfineart.com

David Eugene Henry is an American painter and sculptor. He has been included in “Who’s Who in American Art” since 2006.

== Early life and education ==
Born in Rome, Georgia in 1946 Henry studied at the College of Architecture at Georgia Tech under the direction of P. M. Heffernan. At Georgia Tech he studied with painters John Hardy, George Beatty Jr., and sculptor Julian Hoke Harris. He was included in the 24th Annual Southeastern Exhibition at the High Museum of Art in 1970.

After receiving his degree in architecture he enrolled in the Master of Visual Arts program at Georgia State University and in 1971 was awarded a scholarship to study art in Italy. Clement Greenburg, one of America’s foremost mid-century art critics, selected artwork from David’s Italian series for inclusion in a national exhibition of contemporary American art. A painting from that series was exhibited in the Georgia Artists 2 Invitational Exhibition at the High Museum of Art in Atlanta and two other works were chosen by the Georgia Council for the Arts to be purchased for the State of Georgia permanent art collection. Artworks in private collections were featured in architecture and interior design magazines. In 1973 he received a grant to work as artist-in-residence for the city of Albany. From 1972 through 1975 he created several murals in public buildings and won a mural design competition sponsored by the National Endowment for the Arts to create a large mural for the Bayfront Center Arena in downtown St. Petersburg, Florida. In 1975 he accepted a position teaching in the art department at Eckerd College and by the end of 1977 he had received significant awards including three grants from the National Endowments for the Arts.

== Art career ==
In 1980 he set up a studio in New York City and did post-graduate studies at the Art Students’ League of New York and with notable American painter Philip Pearlstein. In 2012 he moved to Palm Springs, California. His artwork is in the permanent collections of the State of Georgia, the Georgia Museum of Art, the Indiana Museum of Art, the Leslie-Lohman Museum of Art, and the Morris Museum of Art.

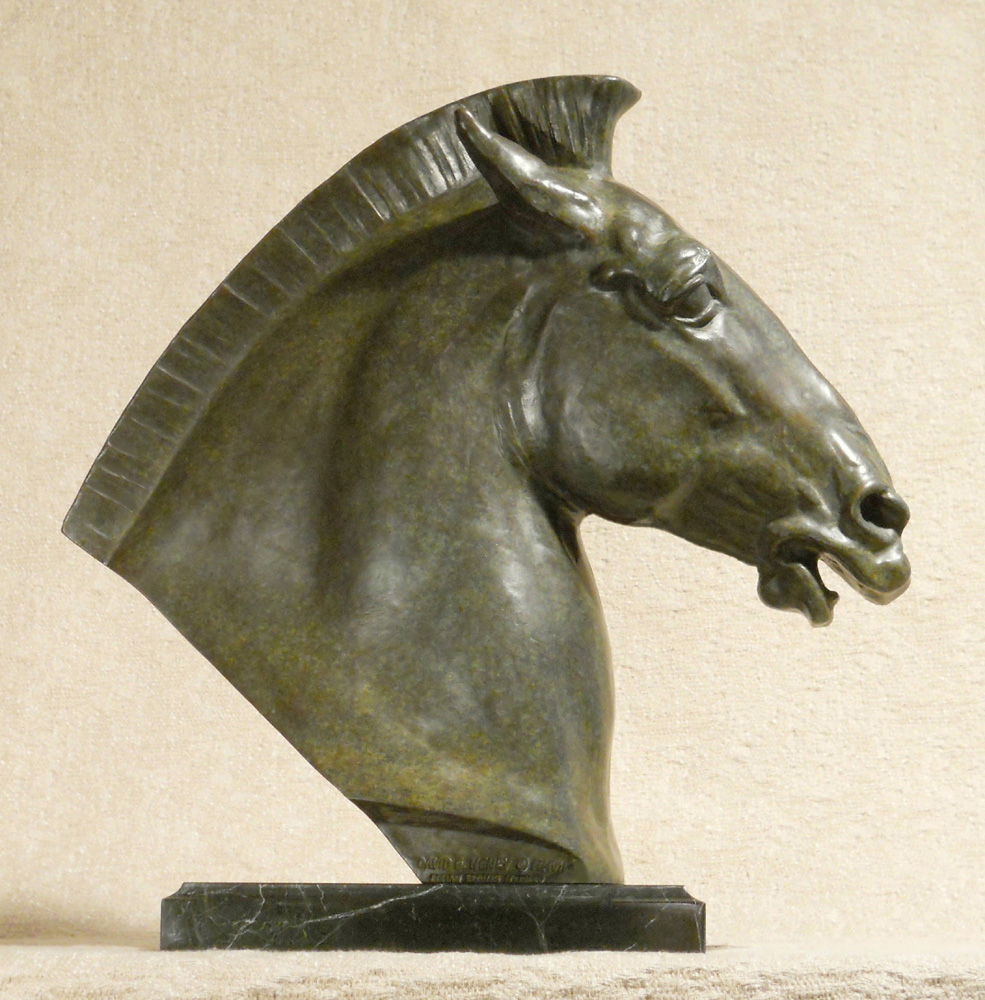
Bronze of Bucephalus

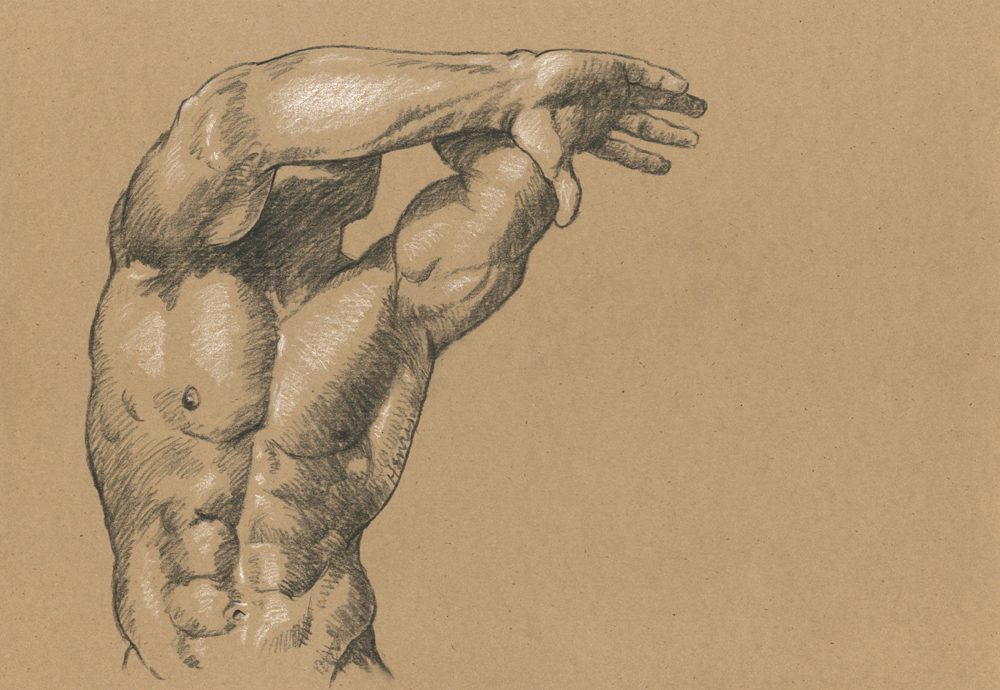
Charcoal Drawing

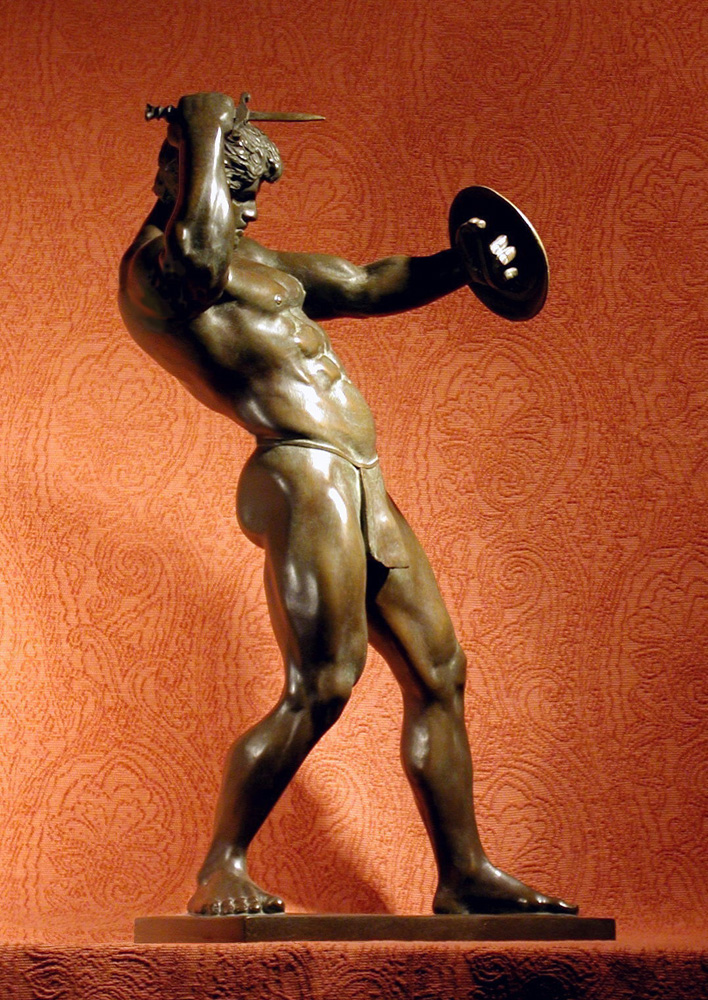

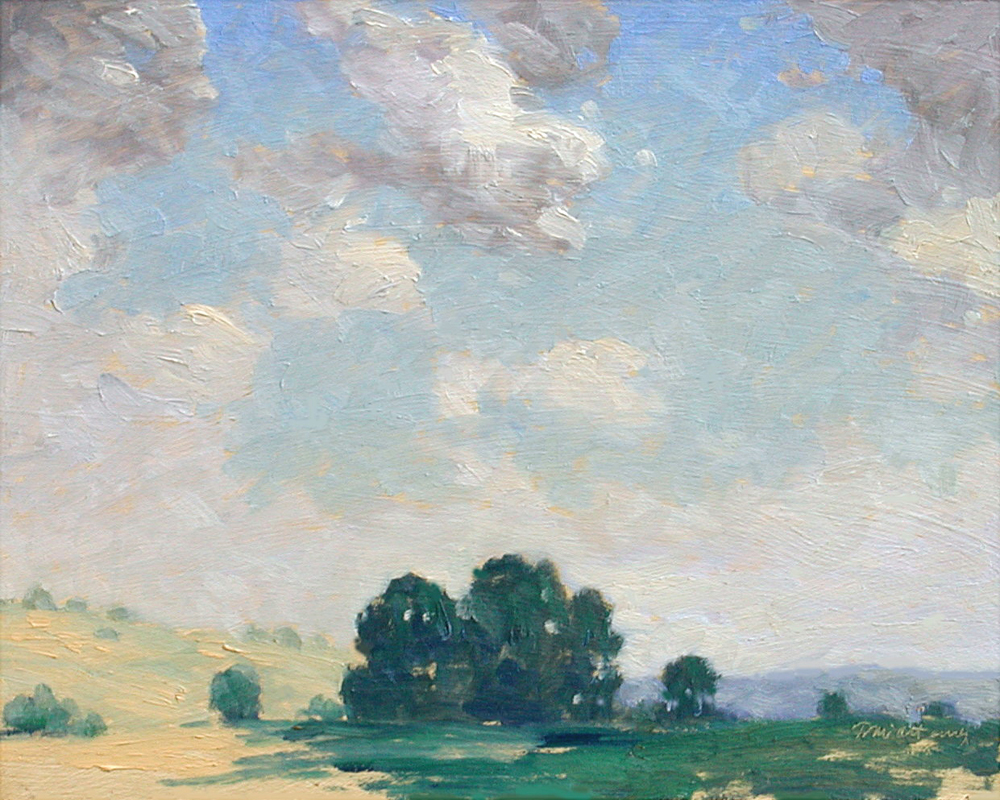

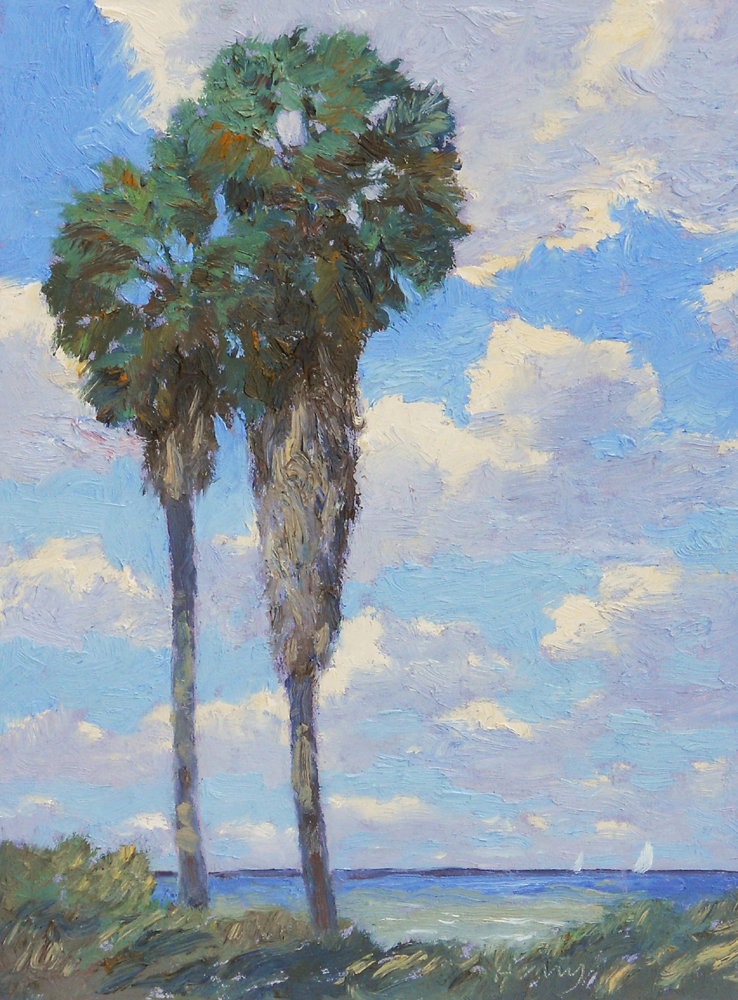

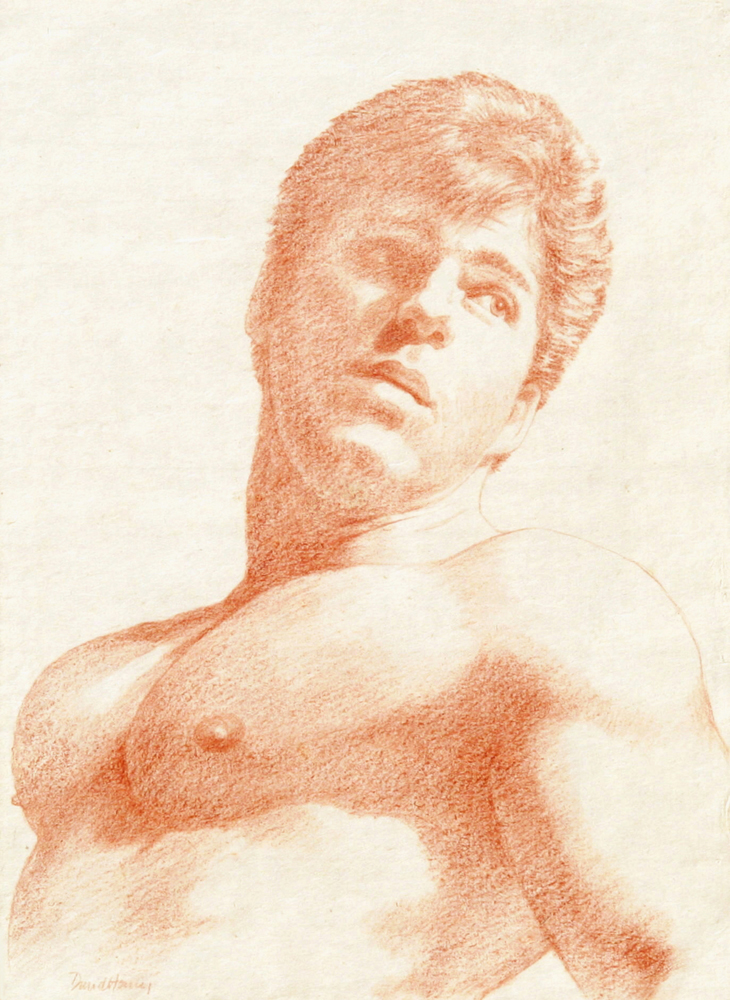

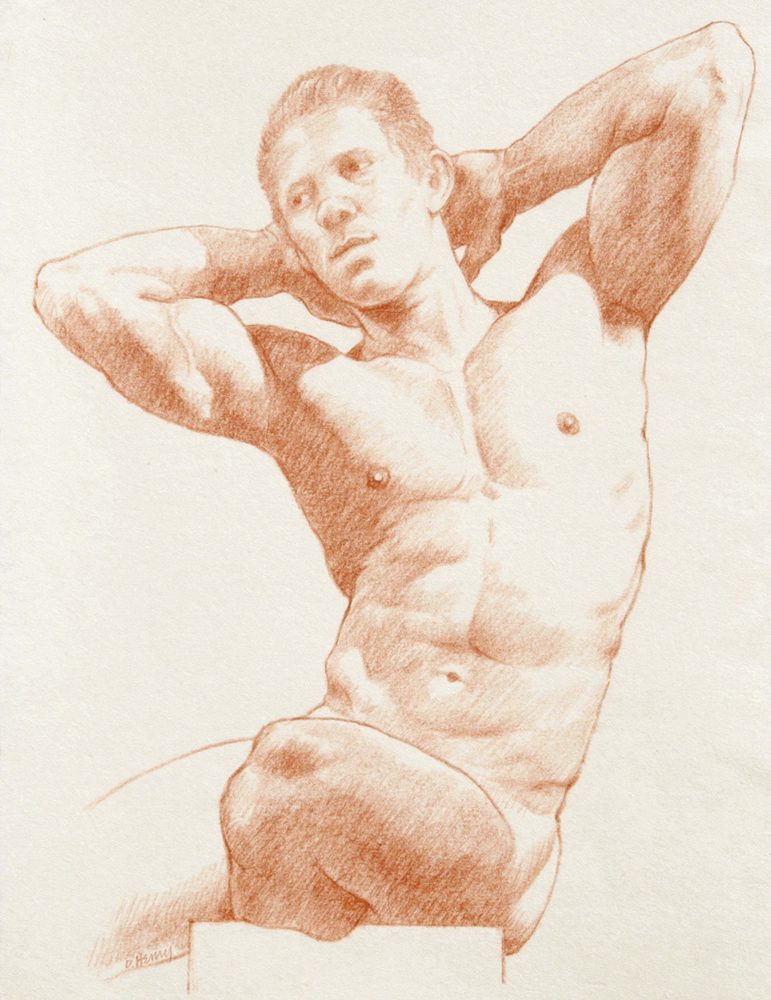

== Awards ==
- National Endowment for the Arts, Three Grants, 1973, 1974, 1975
- First Prize in Painting, Twenty-second Arts Festival of Atlanta, 1975
- Purchase Award, Piedmont Exhibition, Mint Museum of Art, 1972
- First Prize, National Endowment for the Arts mural competition, 1977
- Tau Sigma Delta Honor Society in Architecture and Allied Arts

== Memberships ==
- Salmagundi Club (New York)
- American Artists’ Professional League
- Allied Artists of America
- National Society of Artists
- Artists Council of the Palm Springs Art Museum

== Public collections - partial list ==
- Georgia Museum of Art
- Indiana Museum of Art
- Leslie-Lohman Museum of Art (NYC)
- State of Georgia permanent art collection
- Morris Museum of Art

== See also ==
- Who’s Who in American Art
- Georgia Institute of Technology College of Design
- High Museum of Art
- Clement Greenberg
- Eckerd College
- National Endowment for the Arts
- Art Students League of New York
