= Berthel =

Berthel is a given name and surname. Notable people with the name include:

- Berthel Michael Iversen, Danish architect
- Eric Berthel (born 1967), American politician
- Hans Berthel, German art director
- Jens Berthel Askou (born 1982), Danish footballer
- Julius Berthel Askou (born 2006), Danish footballer
