= Ruby Cinema, Ipoh =

Former cinema turned restaurant in Malaysia

Coordinates: 4°35′54″N 101°04′56″E

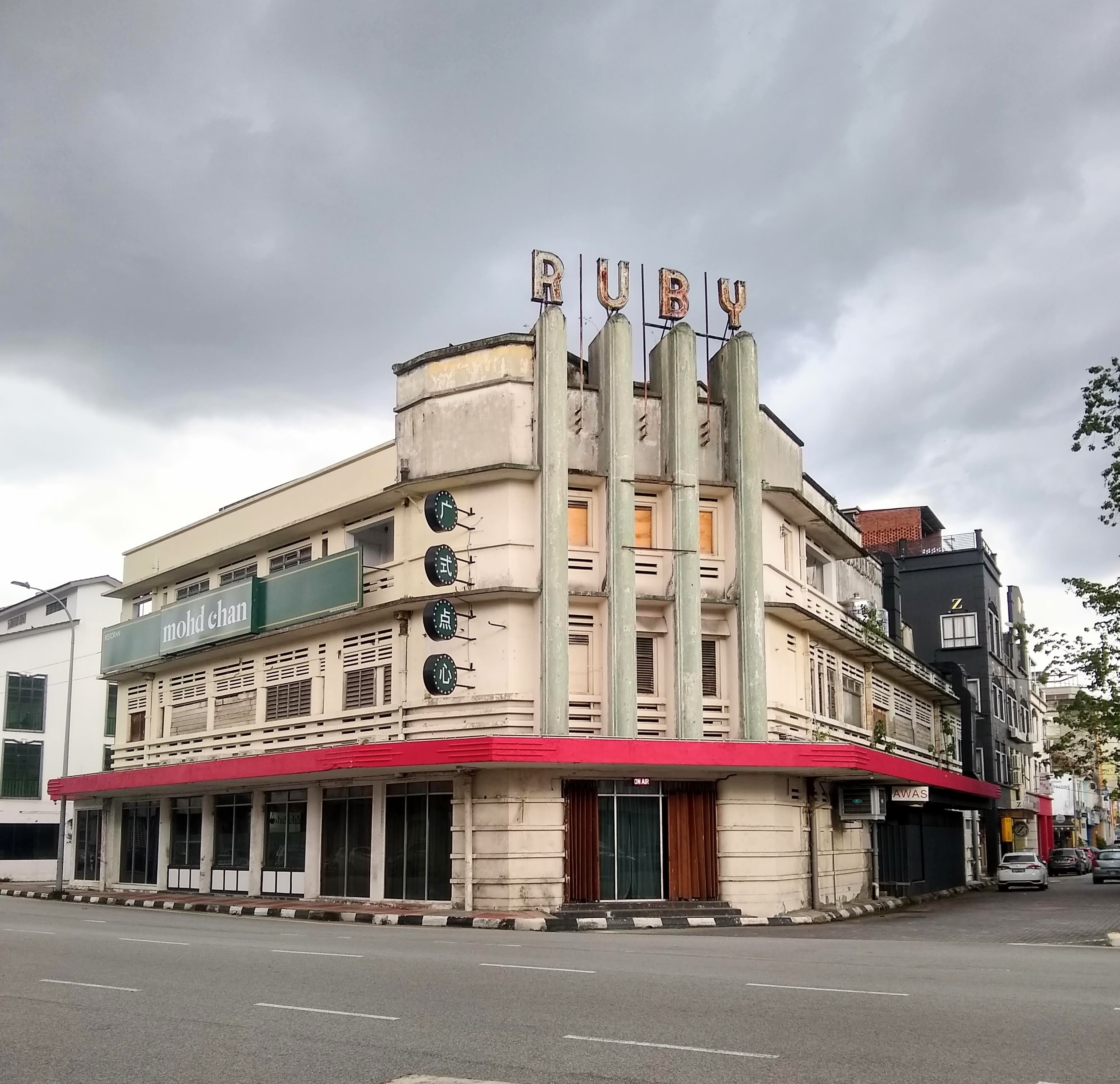
- Ruby Cinema building in 2025

General information
- Type: Former cinema, now a restaurant
- Architectural style: Art Deco
- Address: 56 Jalan Raja Musa Aziz
- Town or city: Ipoh
- Country: Malaysia
- Inaugurated: 4 October 1938

Design and construction
- Architect(s): Berthel Michael Iversen

The Ruby Cinema is a former cinema in Ipoh, Malaysia. Noted for its Art Deco style of architecture, when it opened in 1938 it was considered the most modern cinema on the Malay Peninsula.

== History ==
Ruby Cinema was designed for tin mining tycoons Lau Ek Ching and Ong Ee Lim by Danish architect, Berthel Michael Iversen who came to Malaya in 1928 and settled in Ipoh where he opened his own architectural firm in 1936. Iverson, who is credited with introducing modern architecture to Malaya, designed many landmark buildings in Malaya.

Opened on 4 October 1938 by British Resident Geoffrey Cator, the cinema showed Shaw Brothers films using the most modern screen and sound apparatus. It closed in the 1990s due to competition from multiplex cinemas. Later, it was used as a furniture store, and in 2024 it was converted into a restaurant.
