= Mercantile Bank Building, Ipoh =

1930s building in Ipoh, Malaysia

Coordinates: 4°35′50″N 101°04′26″E

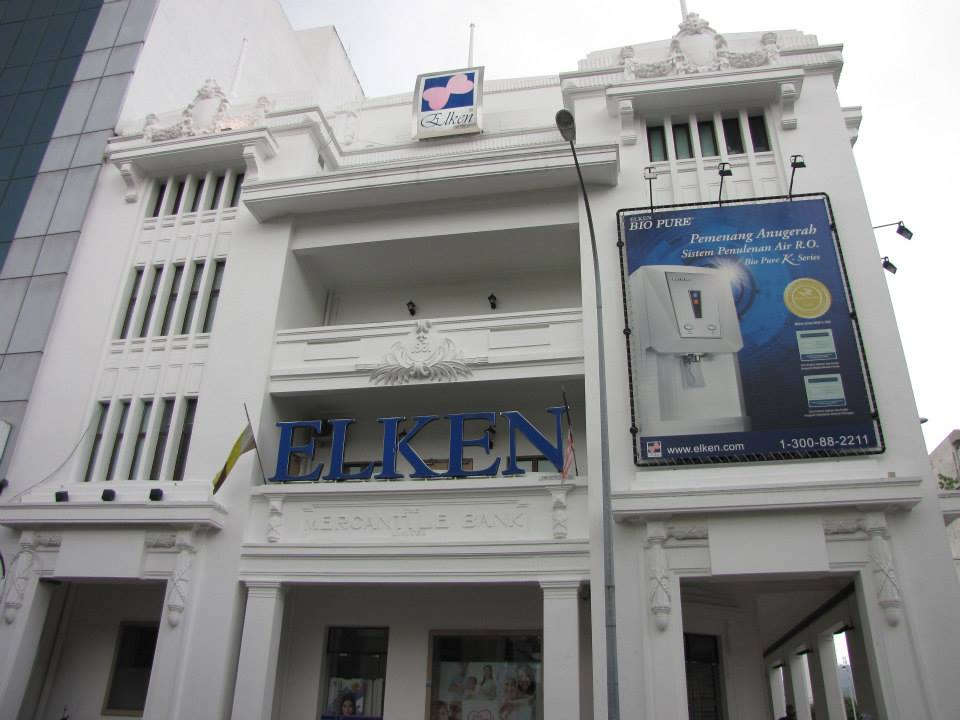

General information
- Architectural style: Art Deco
- Address: 15 Jalan Dato' Maharaja Lela
- Town or city: Ipoh
- Country: Malaysia
- Completed: 1931
- Opened: 29 August 1931

Technical details
- Floor count: 3

Design and construction
- Architect(s): Keys & Dowdeswell
- Main contractor: Brossard & Mopin

The Mercantile Bank Building is a historical building in Ipoh, Malaysia. Completed in 1931 and situated in the old commercial centre of the town, it served as the Ipoh branch of Mercantile Bank of India Ltd.

== History ==
Mercantile Bank, originally known as the Mercantile Bank of India, London and China, and based in London, was established in the 1850s and operated throughout the Far East before it was acquired by Hongkong and Shanghai Banking Corporation in 1959.

Mercantile Bank arrived in Ipoh in 1928 when it opened an agency office at 11-13 Station Road (now Jalan Dato' Maharaja Lela). Soon after opening, construction began of a new building at the adjacent site owned by the estate of local businessman, the late Shaikh Adam, at 15-19 Station Road, for occupation by Mercantile Bank.

The new three-storey building was designed by Keys & Dowdeswell where renowned Danish architect Berthel Michael Iversen had recently arrived. Known for introducing modern architectural styles throughout Malaya, Iversen was considered to have been responsible for the design. The engineering firm Brossard & Mopin carried out the construction works.

Known initially as "Shaikh Adam Building", it was formally opened by British Resident Bertram Elles on 29 August 1931. Mercantile Bank took up occupation of the ground floor, and the upper floors were let to tenants who included the law firm Maxwell and Kenion, and the building's architects, Keys and Dowdeswell.

== Description ==
The Mercantile Bank building was designed in the Art Deco style and features characteristic flag poles, festoons and frames on its facade, together with the words "Mercantile Bank" and "1931". The three-storey building has two vertical towers on either side of its frontage and balconies running along its side. The top floor has a roof garden with a kitchen and bar and dressing rooms.
