= Berthel Michael Iversen =

Danish architect

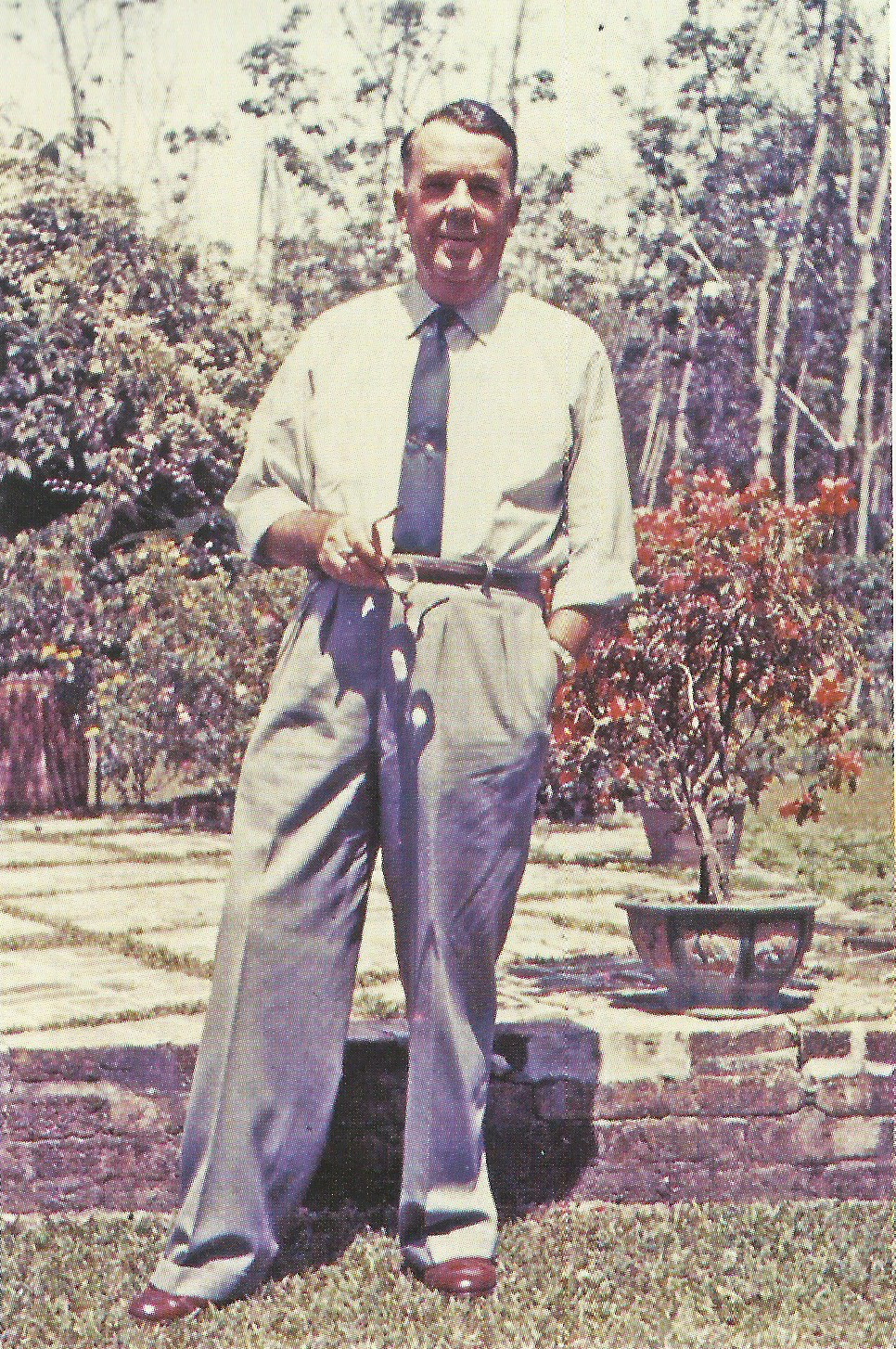
- Berthel Michael Iversen nearing retirement.
- Born: 1906; Copenhagen, Denmark
- Died: 1976 (aged 69–70); Copenhagen
- Occupation: Architect
- Children: Ruth Iversen Rollitt, Per Iversen

Berthel Michael Iversen (Danish pronunciation: [ˈpɛɐ̯tl̩ ˈmiˌkʰɛˀl ˈiˀvɐsn̩], 1906–76) was a Danish architect active in Malaysia, and the founder of Iversen, van Sitteren & Partners. Most of his works were in Malaya (now Malaysia) and Singapore. He designed a large number of buildings in his Malayan home town, Ipoh. He eventually had offices in Ipoh, Penang, Kuala Lumpur, and Singapore. He did a large number of cinemas throughout Malaysia for the Shaw Brothers, a film production company which was the precursor to the Shaw Organization. Iversen's early works are sometimes described as Art Deco, but after World War II, his buildings became increasingly modern, and he became one of Southeast Asia's most important modernists. His works were an integral part economically and symbolically for the newly developed countries of Malaysia and Singapore.

== Personal life ==
Born in Copenhagen, Denmark, in 1906, Berthel Michael was the youngest of seven siblings in the Iversen family. He was named after the sculptor Bertel Thorvaldsen. He exhibited an artistic streak from a young age, and graduated from the Royal Academy in Copenhagen in architecture. He relocated to Ipoh, Malaysia. He was married and had two children, Ruth Iversen Rollitt (daughter) and Per Iversen (son). In 1966, Iversen retired and left his firm to his son Per and his Chinese partners. He died in Copenhagen in 1976, age 70.

== Career ==
In 1928, Iversen came to Malaya (Malaysia) and started his career as an architect. His elder brother Werner Iversen had been a successful planter in Malaya since 1918, and convinced Berthel to relocate. Young Iversen worked for Keys And Dowdeswell firm when he first landed Asia. In 1936, Iversen established his own firm with S.H van Sitteren in Ipoh- Iversen, van Sitteren & Partners. Iversen was a member of the Building Association of Ipoh, in the state of Perak. He was responsible for some of the famous modernist landmark buildings in Ipoh, including the Ipoh Race Course. He designed a large number of cinemas for his hometown, including the Lido., Rex, Majestic (demolished), Ruby, Odeon and Cathay cinemas, many of which are still standing. Also for the Shaw Brothers he designed Jubilee Park which was an outdoor entertainment centre and cinema. The Mercantile Bank, Lam Looking Bazaar, Geological Survey Building, Ipoh Swimming Club, and MCA are some of his prominent projects in Ipoh.

== List of buildings designed by B. M. Iversen and Iversen, van Sitteren and Partners ==
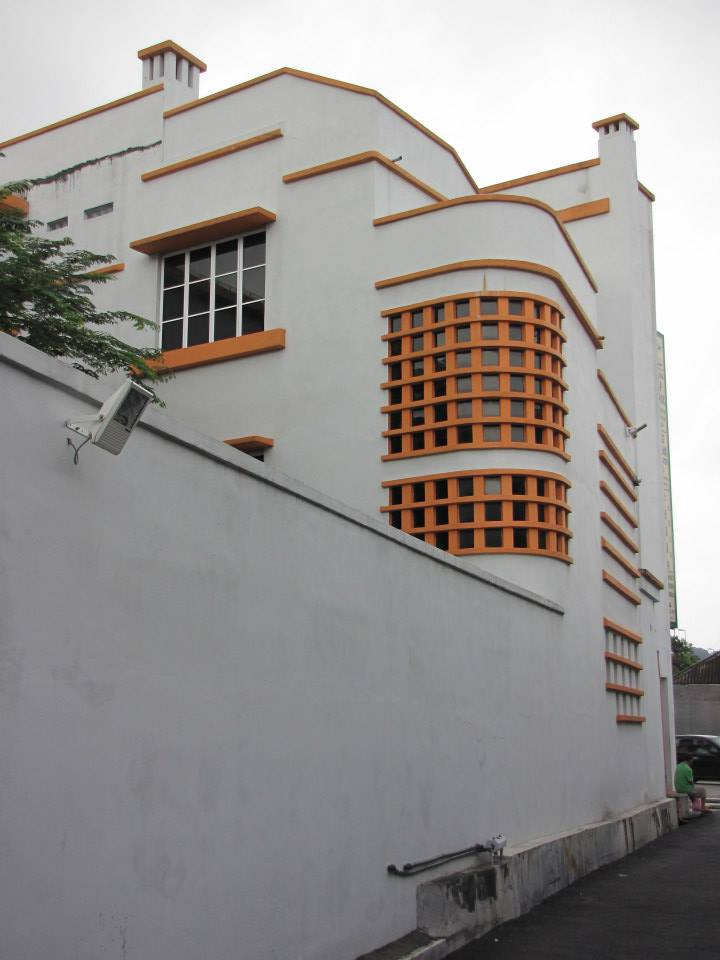
Rear view of Lam Look Ing Bazaar, Ipoh. (rebuilt)

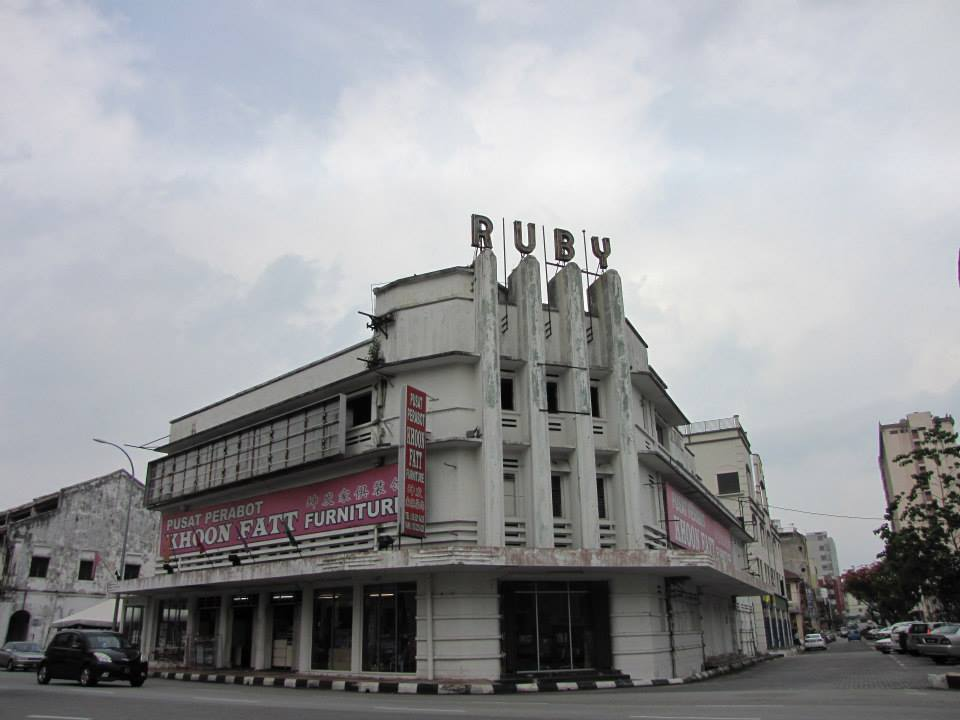
Ruby Cinema, Ipoh

1. Grandstand, Ipoh Race Course
2. Majestic Cinema Ipoh
3. Rex Cinema, Ipoh
4. Ruby Cinema, Ipoh
5. Cathay Cinema, Ipoh
6. Lido Cinema, Ipoh
7. Jubilee Park, Ipoh
8. Mercantile Bank, Ipoh
9. Fair Park Shop houses Ipoh (demolished)
10. Lam Looking Bazaar, Ipoh
11. Veterinary Research Institute, Ipoh
12. Ipoh Swimming Club
13. Ipoh Golf Club
14. MCA Building, Ipoh
15. Eastern Hotel, Ipoh
16. Geological Survey Building, Ipoh
17. The Masonic Lodge, Ipoh
18. No. 62, Gopeng Road, Ipoh
19. No. 74, Gopeng Road, Ipoh
20. No.14, Jalan Tigerlane (mansion), Ipoh Perak
21. House of former Perak Turf Club Secretary, Ipoh, Perak
22. Lee Wah Building, Kuala Lumpur
23. Loke Yew Building, Kuala Lumpur
24. Federal House, Kuala Lumpur
25. Chinese Swimming Club, Penang
26. Broadcasting Station, Kota Bharu
27. Odeon Theatre, Ipoh
28. St. John's Ambulance Association Perak Headquarters, Ipoh
29. Federal Cinema, Penang

Iversen and his firm did many private houses for wealthy clients throughout the Malay Peninsula. His oeuvre includes numerous government buildings, hospitals, schools, cinemas, radio stations, and churches.

== Awards ==
In 1950, Iversen won in a design competition for a post office saving bank in Malaya while he was recovering from a kidney operation; the prize was $5000. This prominent building eventually became the Federal House, and it is today the Rumah Persekutuan. 15 architects took part in the competition and Iversen's entry placed first. The final working drawings were completed at the end of 1951 and the foundation was completed in May 1952. There was a change of plan when the Post Office Savings Bank would not be accommodated in this building and used entirely for Government Offices. The main block remained unaltered but the two storey block was increased to be the same height as the main building and an additional storey was later added to accommodate Radio Malaya.

The reinforced concrete frame-work was designed so that all secondary beams and slabs are of uniform spam and size, thus reducing the cost of frame-work.

Federal House is one of the earliest building to use plastic as a building material. The exterior of the solid panel is covered with green vitrolite with aluminium cover beads over the joints. The upper part of the panel is filled in with 'Cooper' glass louvers, which forms a continuous window. The delightful visual quality of the facade treatment was later compromised when the occupants painted the clear glass panels to reduce the sun glare and resultant heat gain.

== Buildings ==
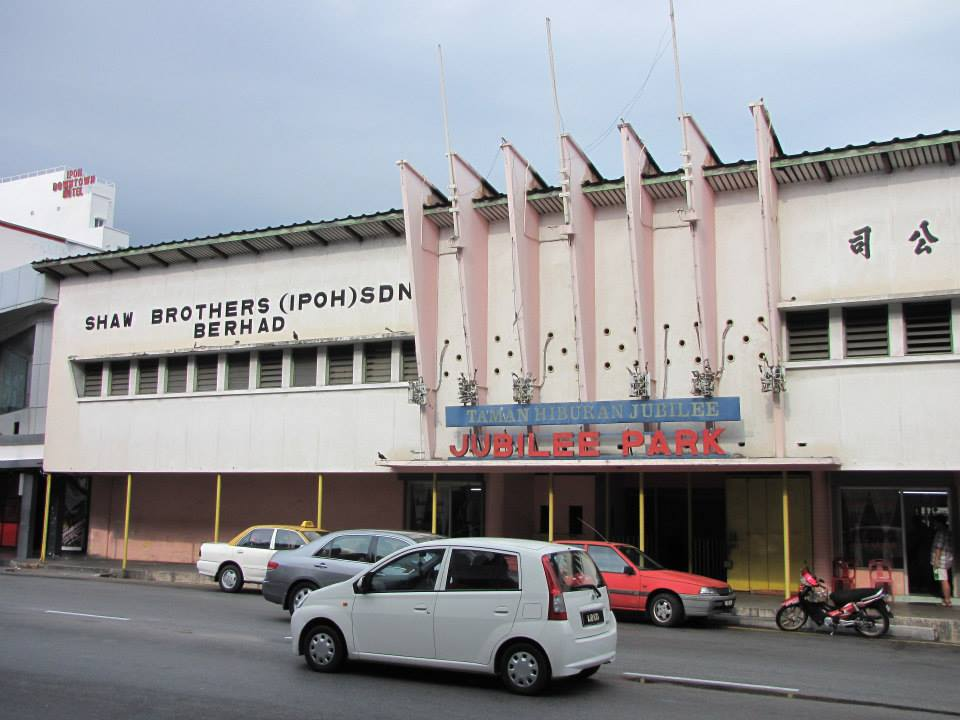
Front view of Jubilee Park, Ipoh

Jubilee Park

Once called "Ipoh Amusement Park", Jubilee Park was owned by the Shaw Brothers. Originally the park was used as an entertainment space to raise money for the victims of the China 1931 flood. It was then bought by Archibald Russel who leased the park to the Shaw Brothers, 30 April 1935. Scenes from director Mamat Khalid's film Zombi Kilang Biskut (2013) were filmed in front of the modern façade.

Lam Look Ing Bazaar Lam Look Ing Bazaar (often written as Lam Looking Bazaar),1933, is located in Jalan Laksamana, Ipoh. Iversen was commissioned to design the project for Penang-born mining tycoon Lam Look Ing. It originally housed a bazaar at street level, and a hotel and the Celestial Cabaret occupied the upper floors. It was a favourite watering hole for European expatriates up until World War II when it became a favorite spot for Japanese officers. In the 1970s, Lam Look Ing Bazaar housed the Perak Emporium, an early incarnation of the air-conditioned department store. The emporium closed down following an economic downturn, and the building became dilapidated. A fire exacerbated its condition. Recently the Lam Look Ing Bazaar was bought and restored. This included a new roof but much of the original design was faithfully retained.

The Geological Survey

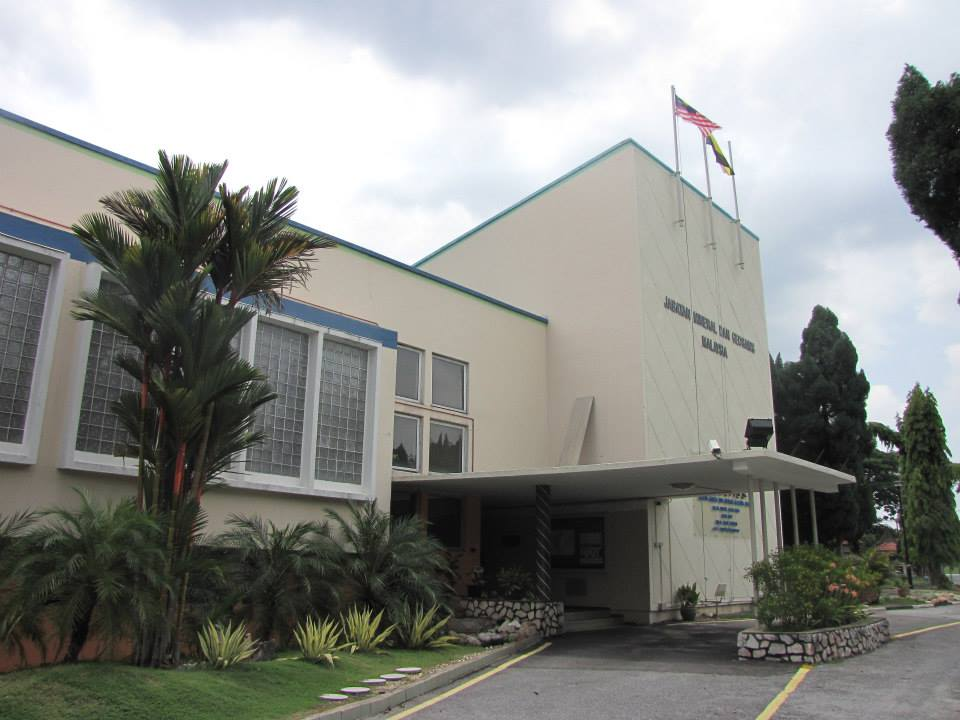
Geological Survey Building, Ipoh

This Geological Survey Building, Ipoh, Perak, was an early Iversen work. This cornerstone for the building in Ipoh was laid by YM Raja Idris Shah ibin Almarhum Sultan Iskandar Shah, the Raja Muda of Perak in July, 1955 Iversen was hired to remodel and enlarge his project, and the building's library includes a mosaic floor of the Malayan Peninsula.

The Masonic Lodge

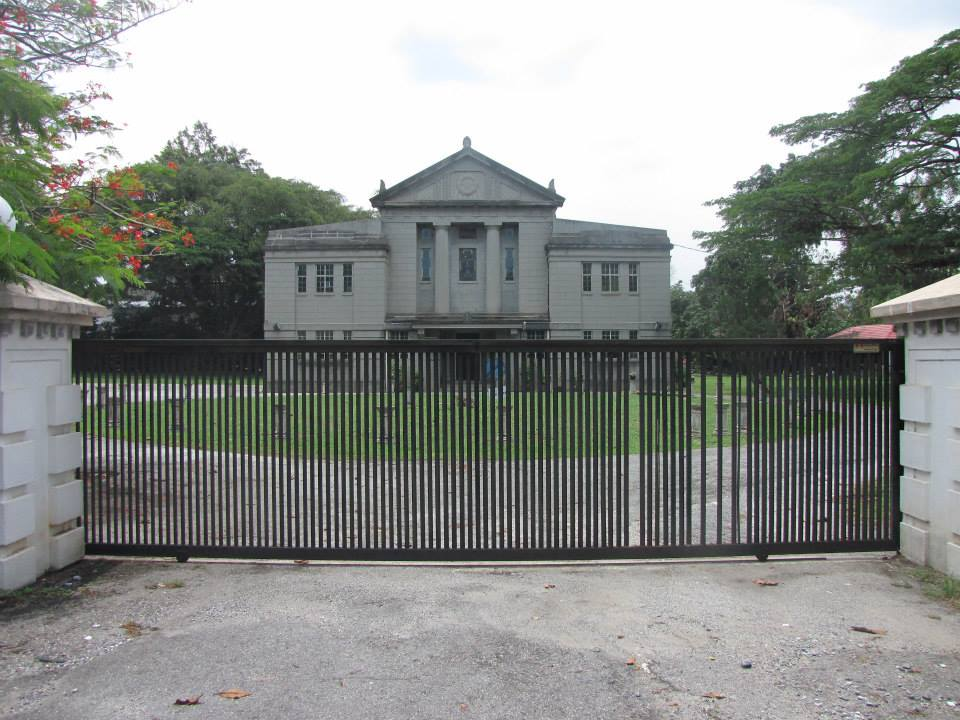
The Masonic Lodge

It is a freemason which built by B.M Iversen during the early 1930s, it is the second lodge.

Lee Wah Building One of the most expensive 11-storey building was erected in Kuala Lumpur during the early 60's. by the Lee Wah Bank Ltd incorporated some of the most modern banking equipments. It cost $4million. B.M Iversen's firm Iversen, van Sitteren and partners was responsible for the building design and the designer was Peter Vermeer Lee Wah Building is still standing Kuala Lumpur near Petaling street but with a new name. Union Bank.

Lido Theatre, Ipoh Lido Theatre (Chinese: 丽都；丽都戏院) is one of the cinemas designed by BM Iversen estimated between 1955 and 1957. Located across the Cockman Street, Ipoh (currently Jalan Dato Onn Jaafar) from the Cathay Theatre. It was demolished by fire and then later renovated and became a snooker center until current.

== Legacy of Iversen ==
The firm Iversen established lives on under the name Pakatan Akitek Sdn Bhd, in Kuala Lumpur, and there are literally hundreds of buildings in the Malayan peninsular from either B.M. Iversen or Iversen, Van Sitteren and Partners. Just as the new nation of Malaysia adopted modern architecture in many of its prominent buildings (the parliament, the airport, the stadia), Iversen brought architectural modernism to the commercial realm. The international style became a force in Southeast Asia in no small part due to Iversen's efforts.

== Gallery ==
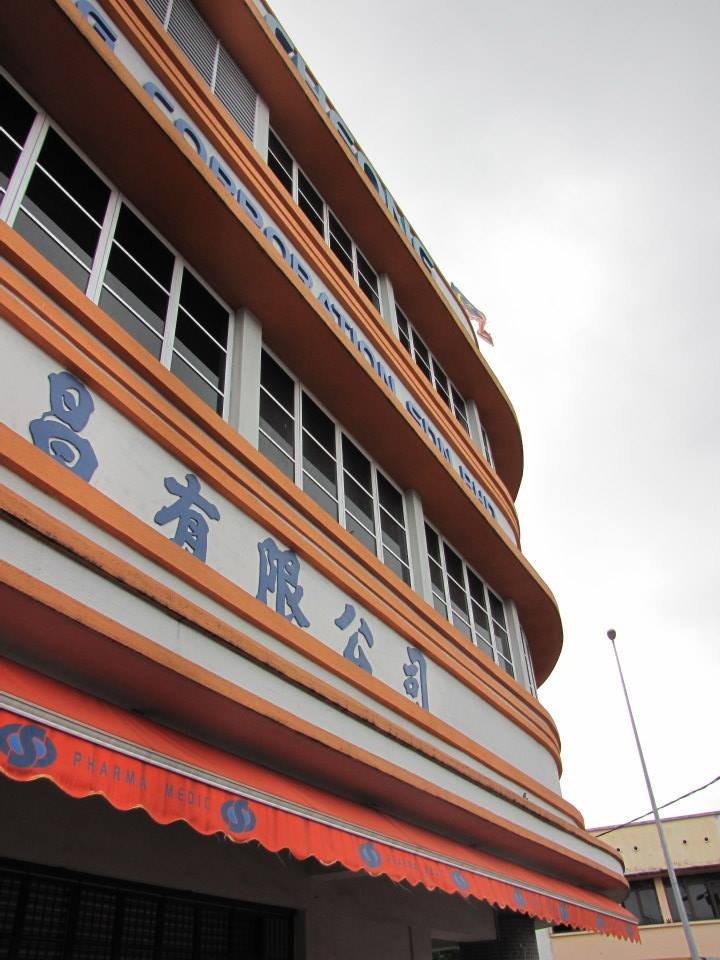
Front view of Lam Look Ing Bazaar, Ipoh. (rebuilt)

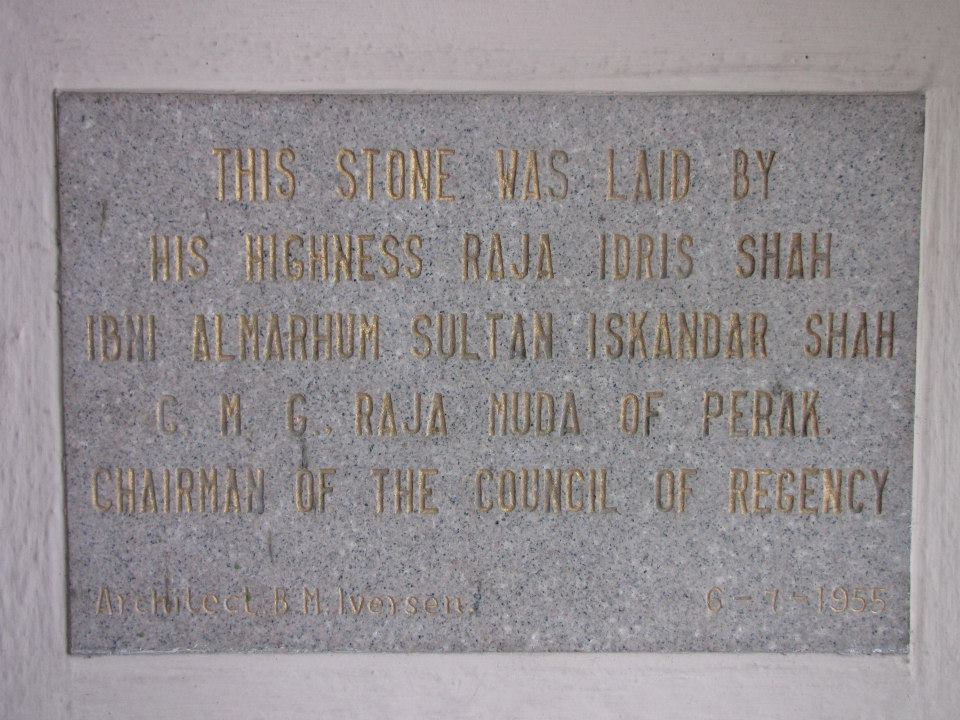
Foundation stone found in front of the Geological Survey Building.

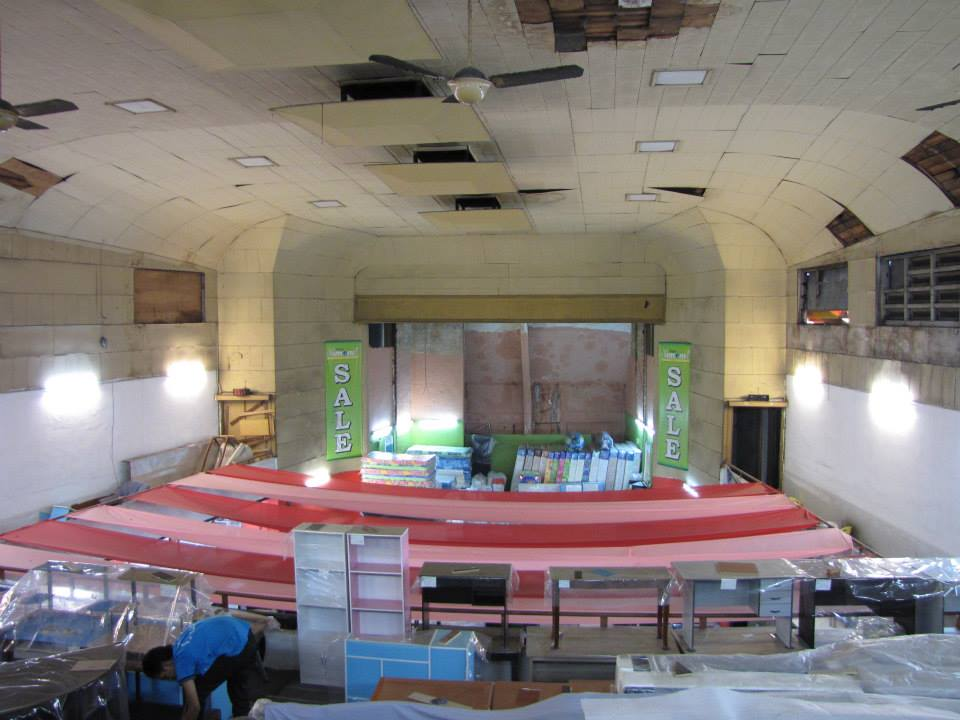
Ruby Cinema Hall

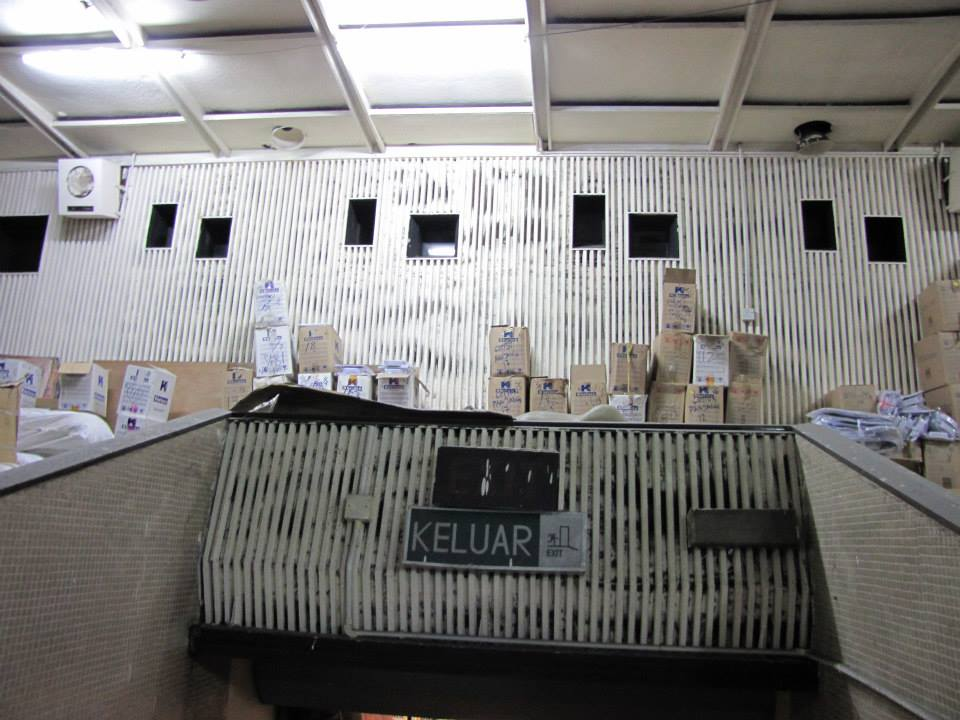
Projector room exterior of Cathay Cinema, Ipoh

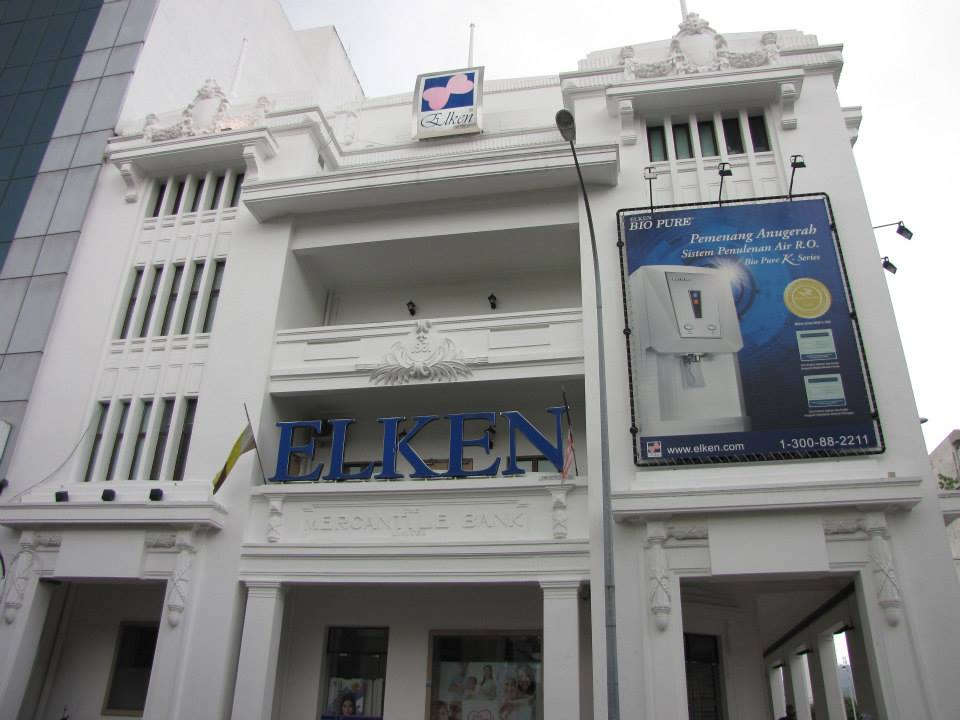
Mercantile Bank

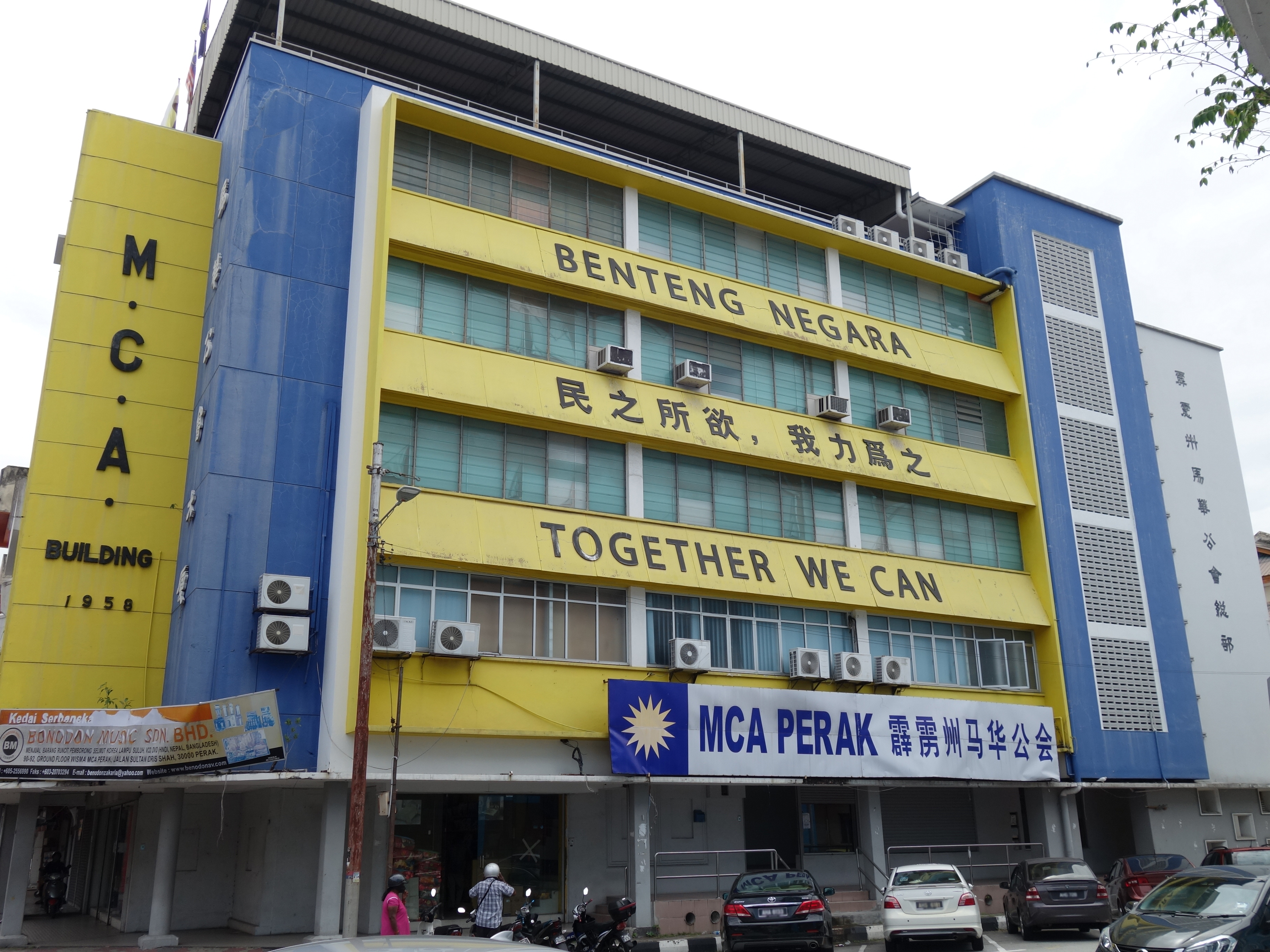
MCA Building, Ipoh

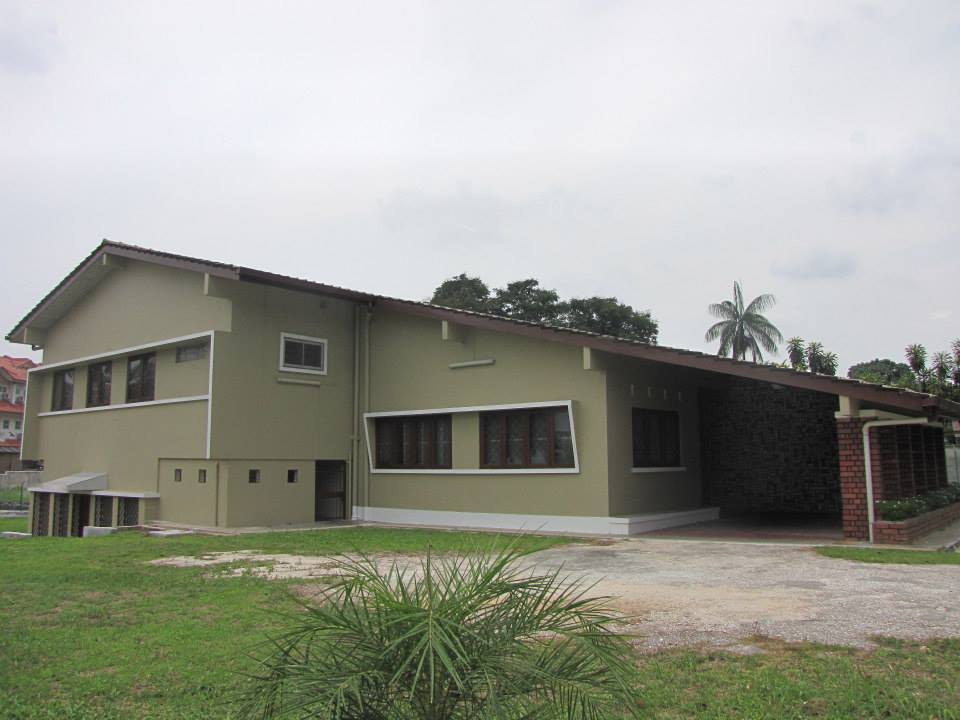
House designed B. M. Iversen (renovated)

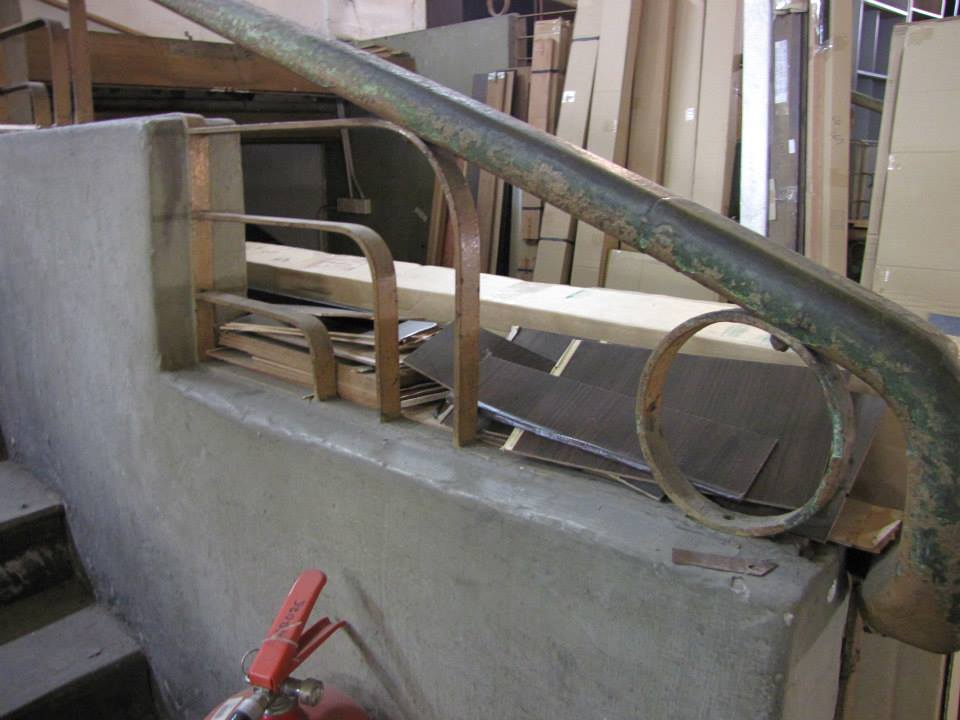
Handrail designed by Iversen, Cathay Cinema, Ipoh

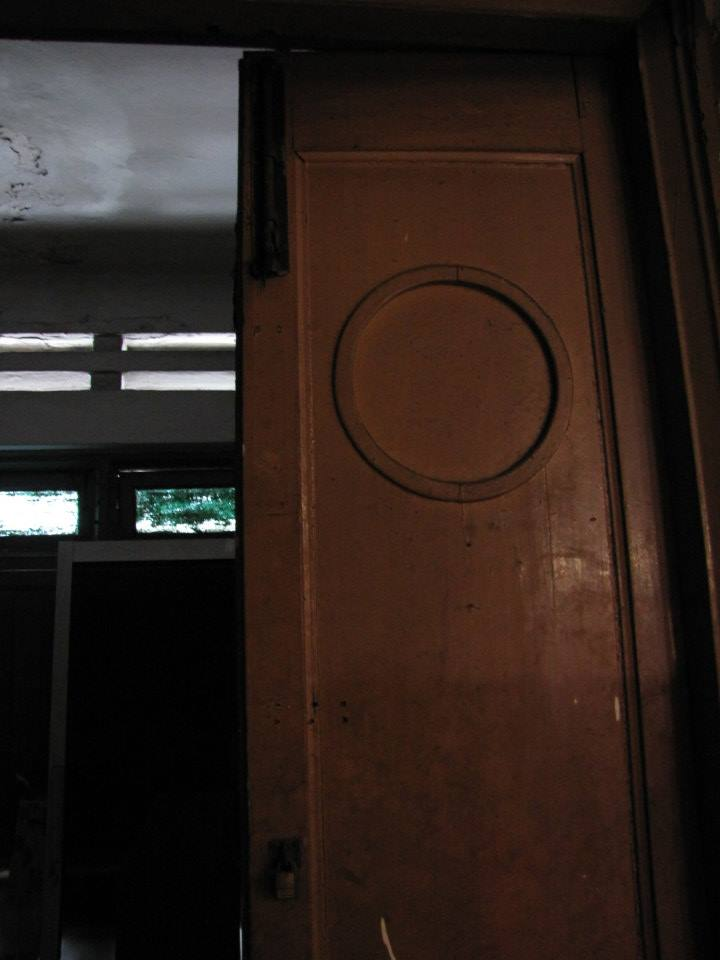
Door Design in Ruby Cinema, Ipoh
