= Honda Jade (automobile) =

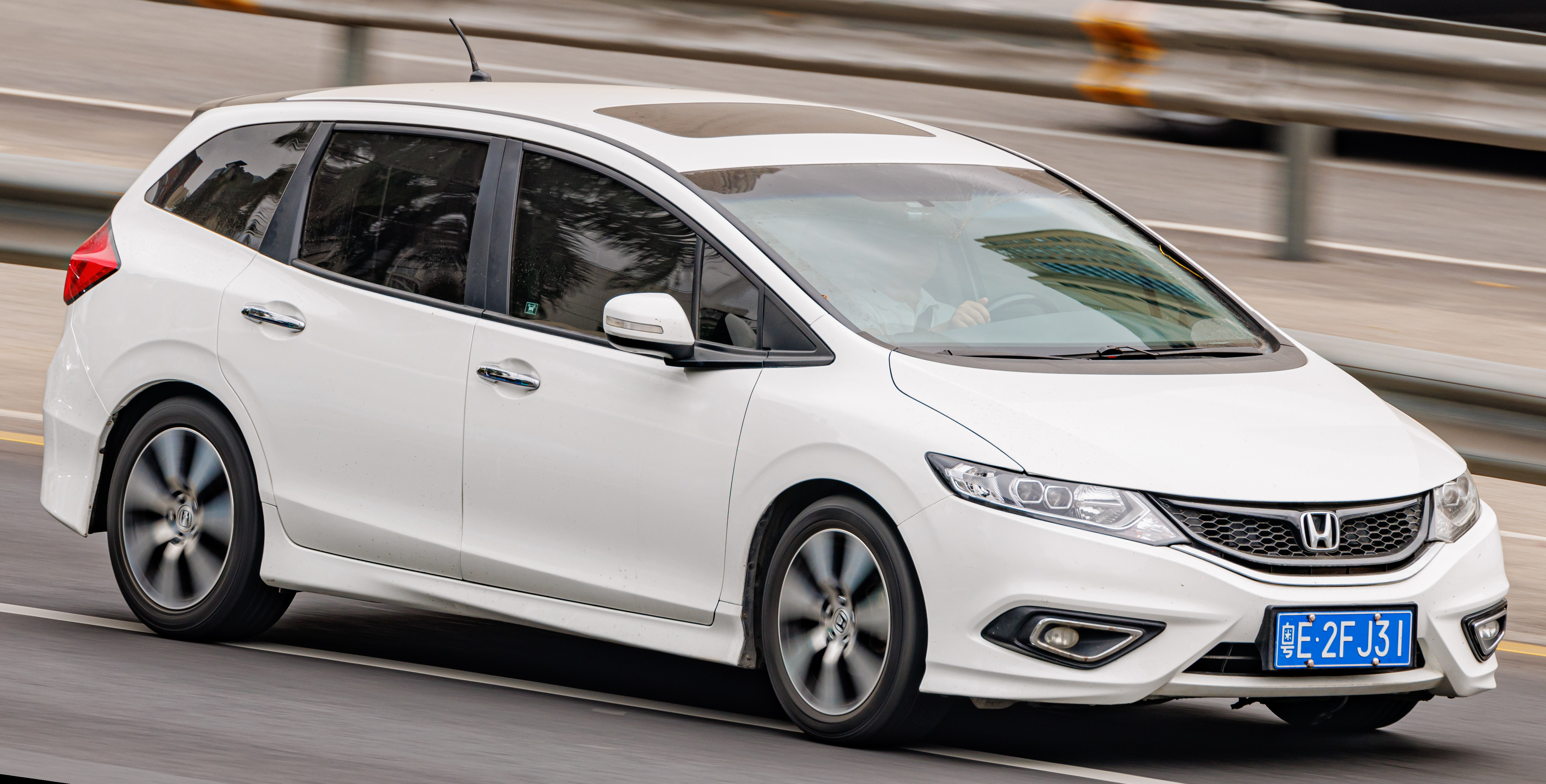
- Honda Jade VTi (China; pre-facelift)

Overview
- Manufacturer: Honda
- Model code: FR4/5
- Production: 2013–2020
- Assembly: Japan: Sayama, Saitama (Sayama Plant); China: Wuhan, Hubei (Dongfeng Honda)

Body and chassis
- Class: Compact MPV
- Body style: 5-door wagon
- Layout: Front-engine, front-wheel-drive
- Related: Honda Civic (ninth generation)

Powertrain
- Engine: 1.5 L L15B DOHC VTEC turbo I4; 1.5 L LEB DOHC Hybrid I4; 1.8 L R18Z6 SOHC i-VTEC I4
- Transmission: 5-speed automatic CVT; 7-speed DCT (hybrid)

Dimensions
- Wheelbase: 2,760 mm (108.7 in)
- Length: 4,660 mm (183.5 in)
- Width: 1,777 mm (70.0 in)
- Height: 1,530–1,540 mm (60.2–60.6 in)
- Curb weight: 1,430–1,510 kg (3,152.6–3,329.0 lb)

Chronology
- Predecessor: Honda Stream

The Honda Jade (Japanese: ホンダ・ジェイド, Honda Jeido) is a compact MPV produced by Honda. It was first introduced in the Chinese market in September 2013, where it is manufactured by Dongfeng Honda. It is based on the ninth-generation Civic platform and has two seating versions for 5 or 4+2 passengers.

== Market ==
The Jade was developed primarily with the Chinese market in mind but has since been released in Japan in February 2015 and parts of Asia such as Hong Kong, and in Singapore. Due to declining sales, it was withdrawn from the Singapore market in May 2018.

Besides the two seating options (5 or 4+2), there are two trim levels (EXi or VTi), and two transmissions (5AT or CVT) and two engines to choose from (1.8L upon release, followed by 1.5L Turbo).

== Versions ==
In February 2015, a hybrid version went on sale in Japan with a 2+2+2 seating layout.

In May 2015, the Jade RS was launched to the Japanese market, offering a newly developed 1.5-litre direct injection VTEC Turbo engine rated at 150 PS (148 hp) at 5,500 rpm and 203 N⋅m (150 lb-ft) of torque between 1,600 and 5,000 rpm.

== Facelift ==
The facelifted Jade was unveiled at the 2016 Auto Guangzhou. The Japanese domestic market version of the facelifted Jade was launched on 17 May 2018, and went on sale on the following day. It was announced on the website on 8 March 2018. The trim levels are G, RS, X, HYBRID RS and HYBRID X, which were equipped with standard Honda Sensing. The Jade was discontinued in China in June 2020 and Japan on 31 July 2020, alongside the Civic sedan and the City, known as the Grace in the latter, due to declining sales of these models.

== Gallery ==
Chinese market

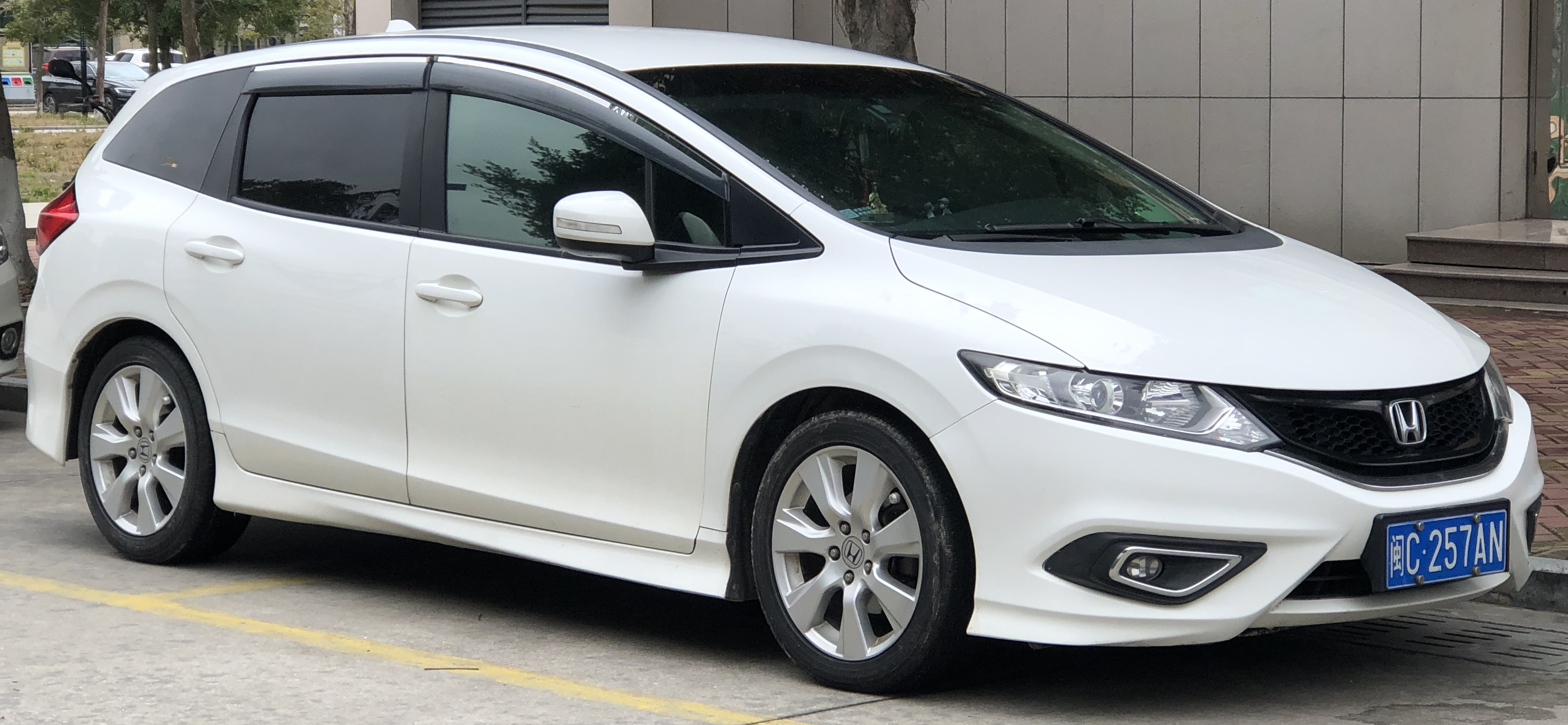
Honda Jade EXi (China; pre-facelift)

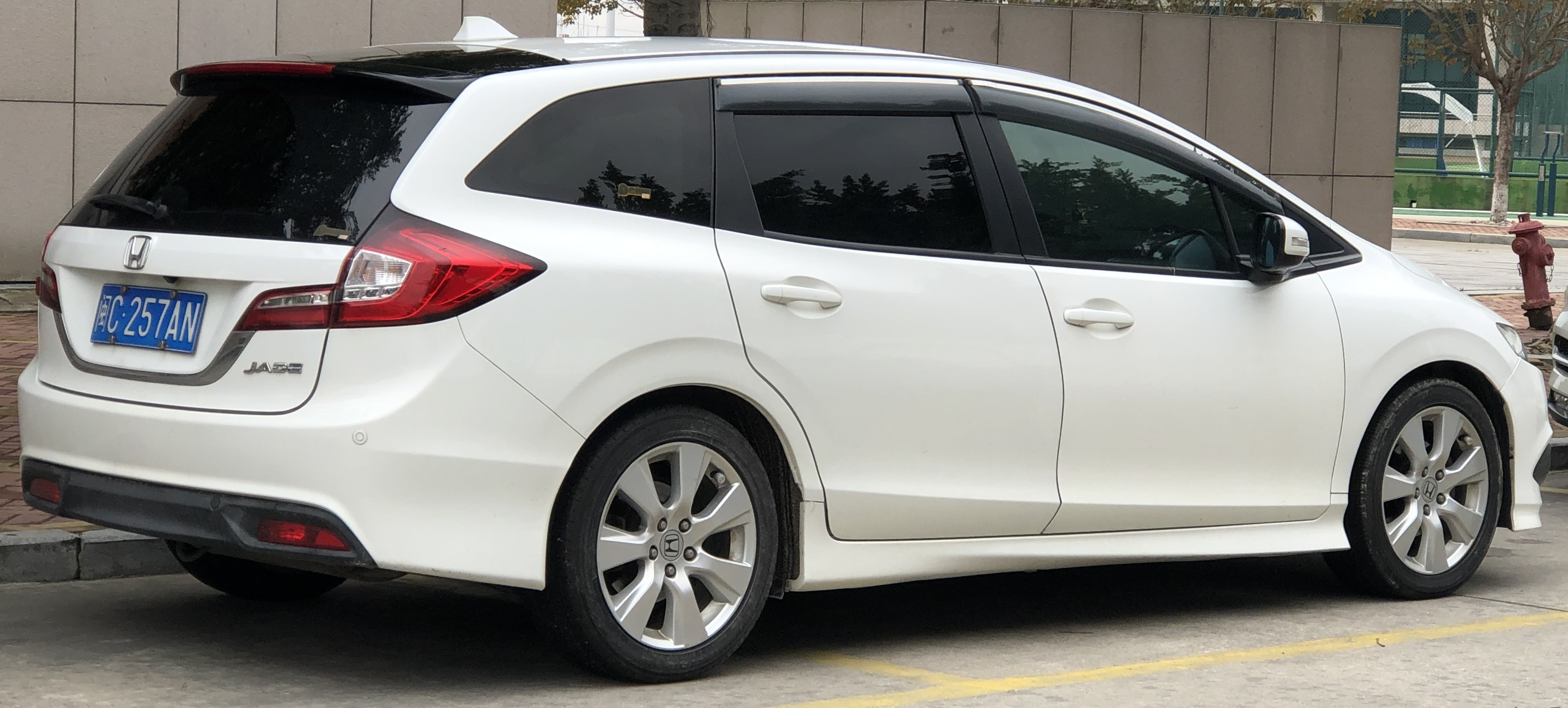
Honda Jade EXi (China; pre-facelift)

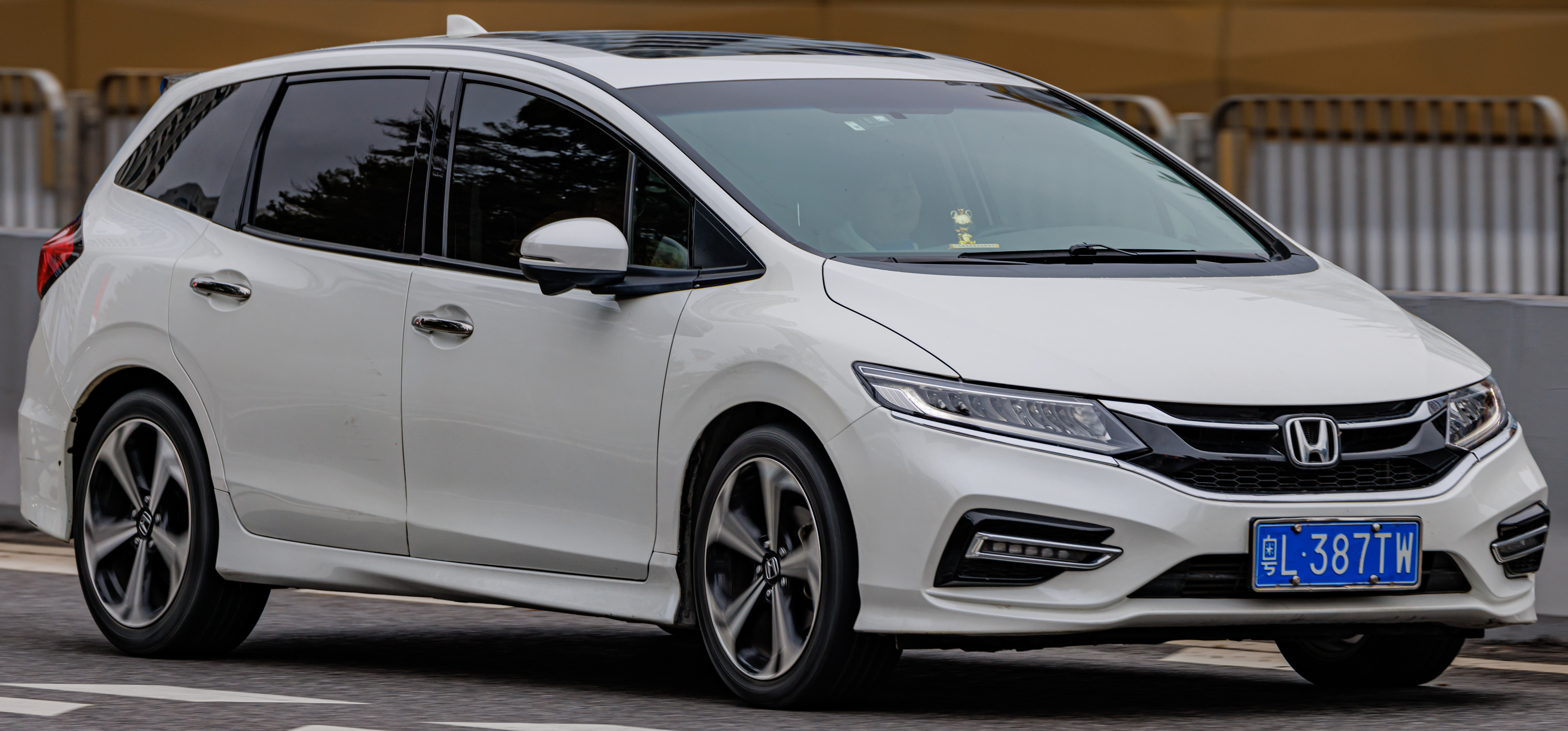
Honda Jade (China; facelift)

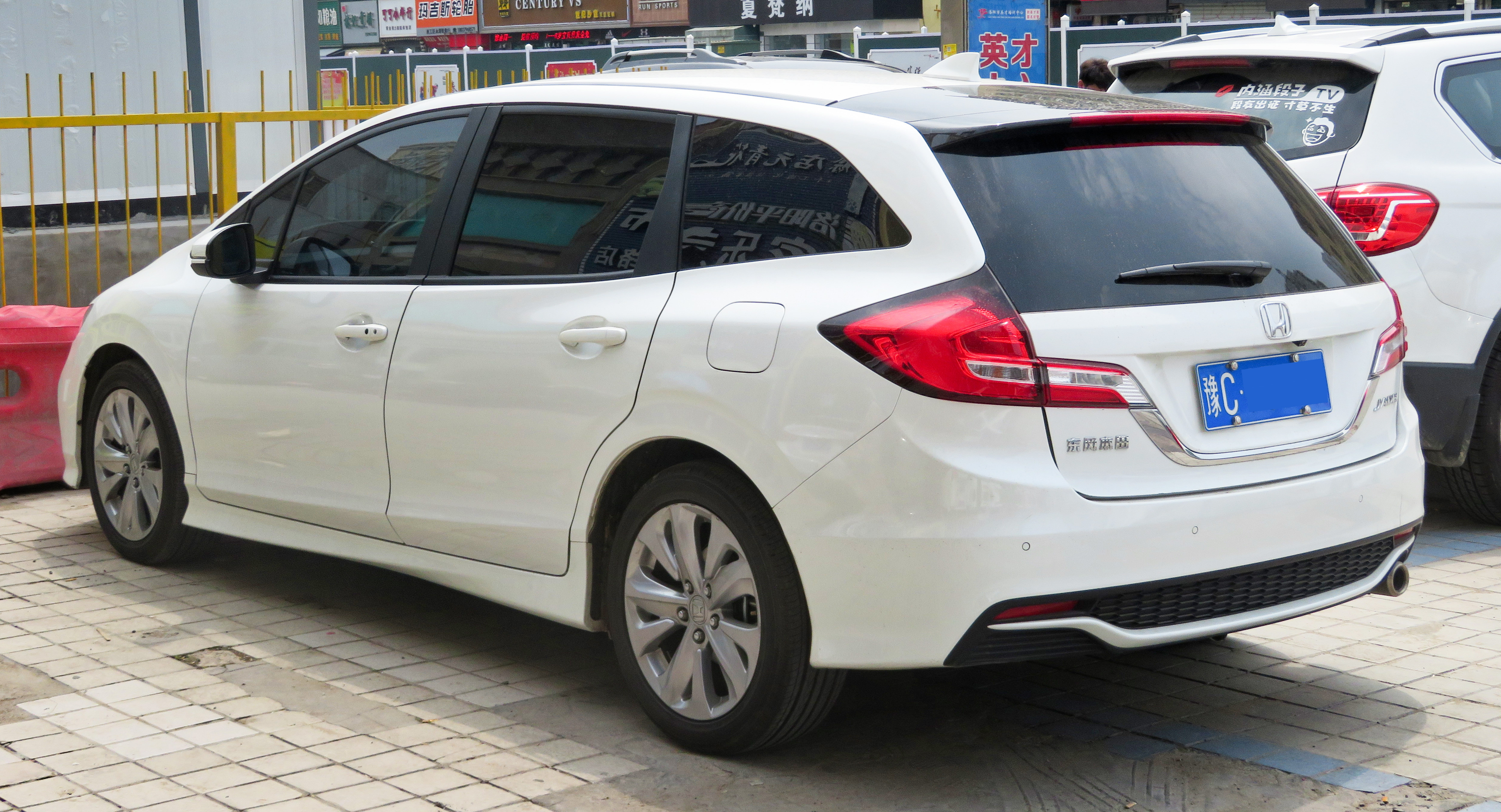
Honda Jade (China; facelift)

Japanese market

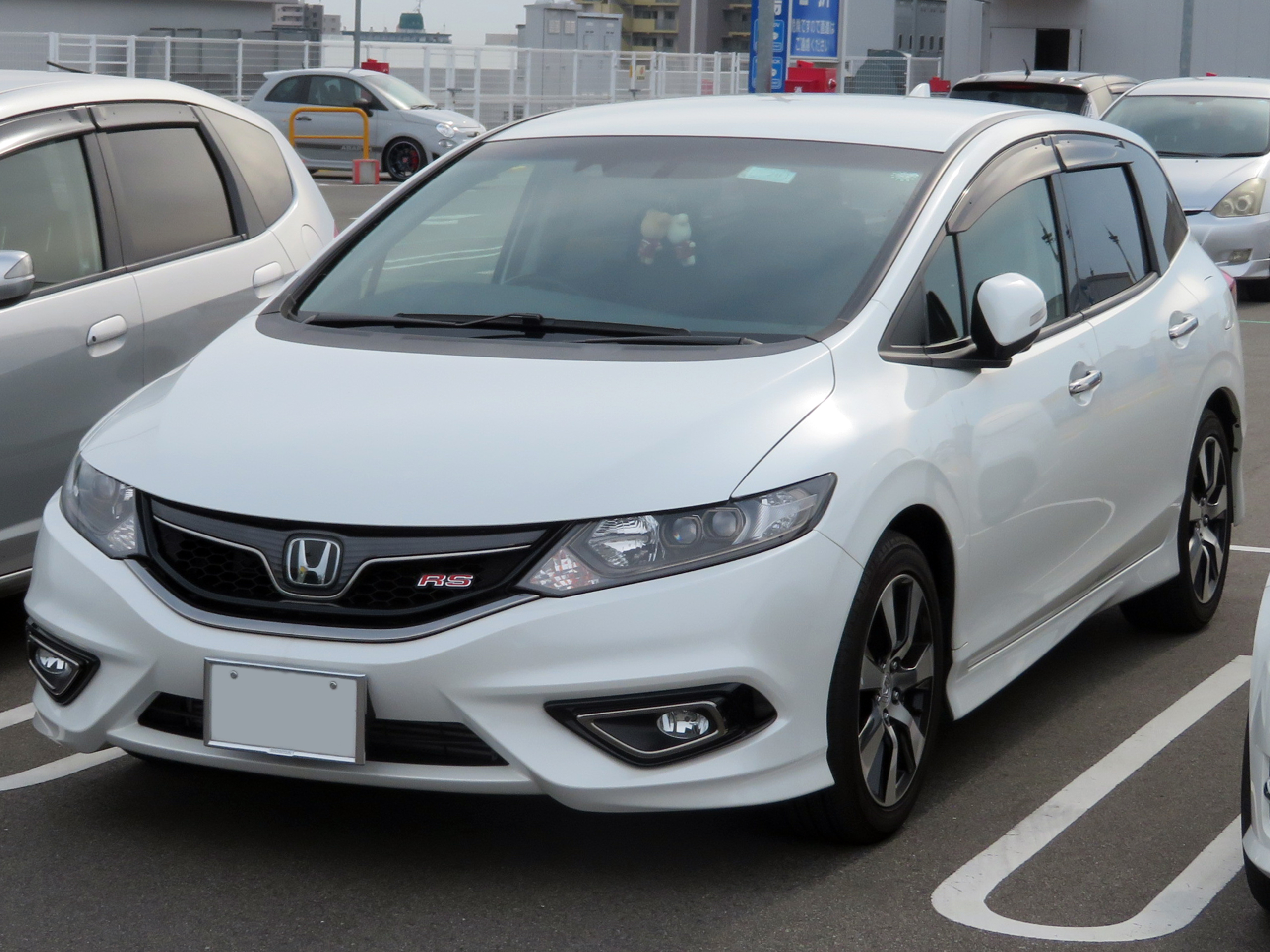
Honda Jade RS (Japan; pre-facelift)

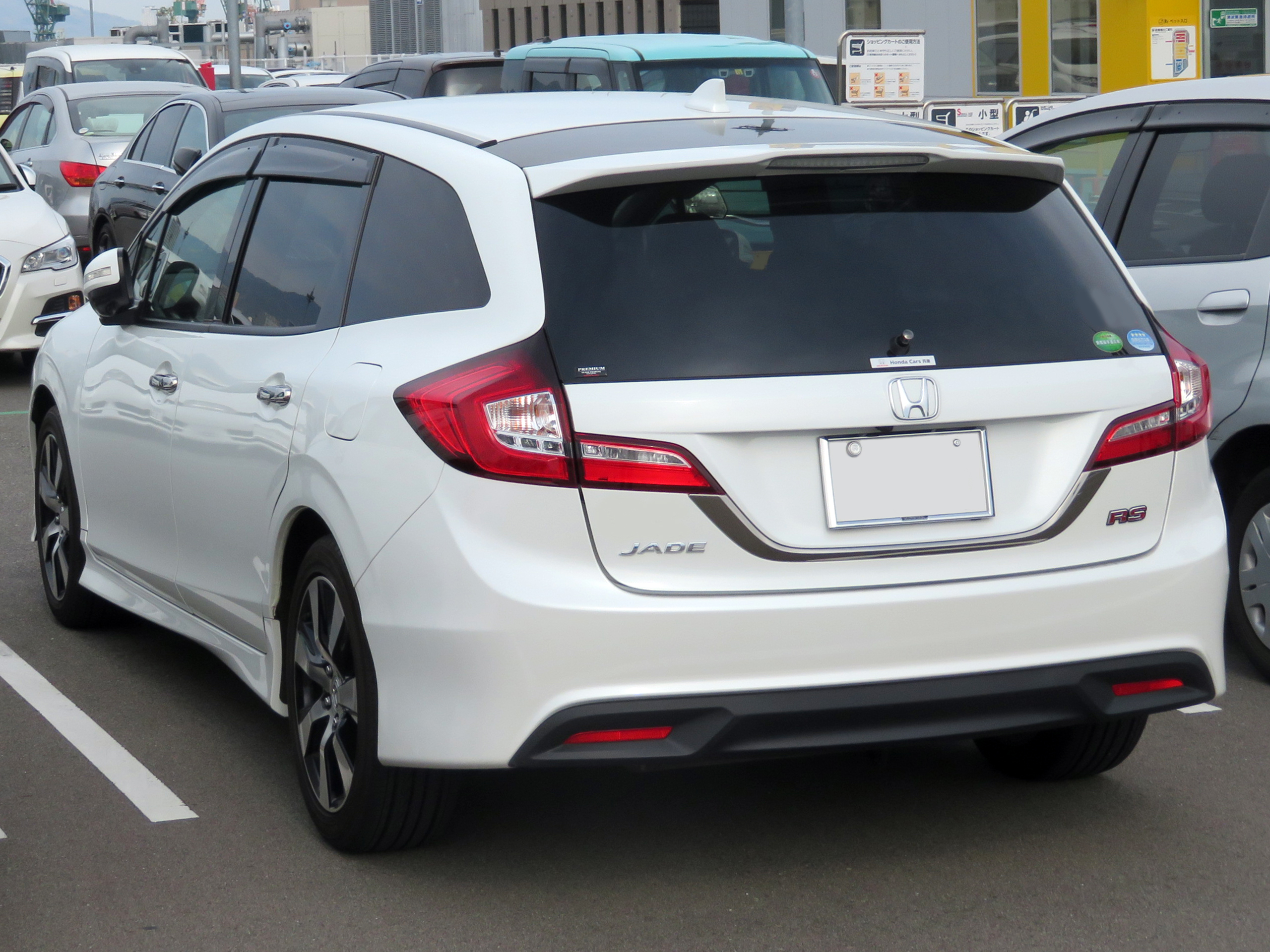
Honda Jade RS (Japan; pre-facelift)

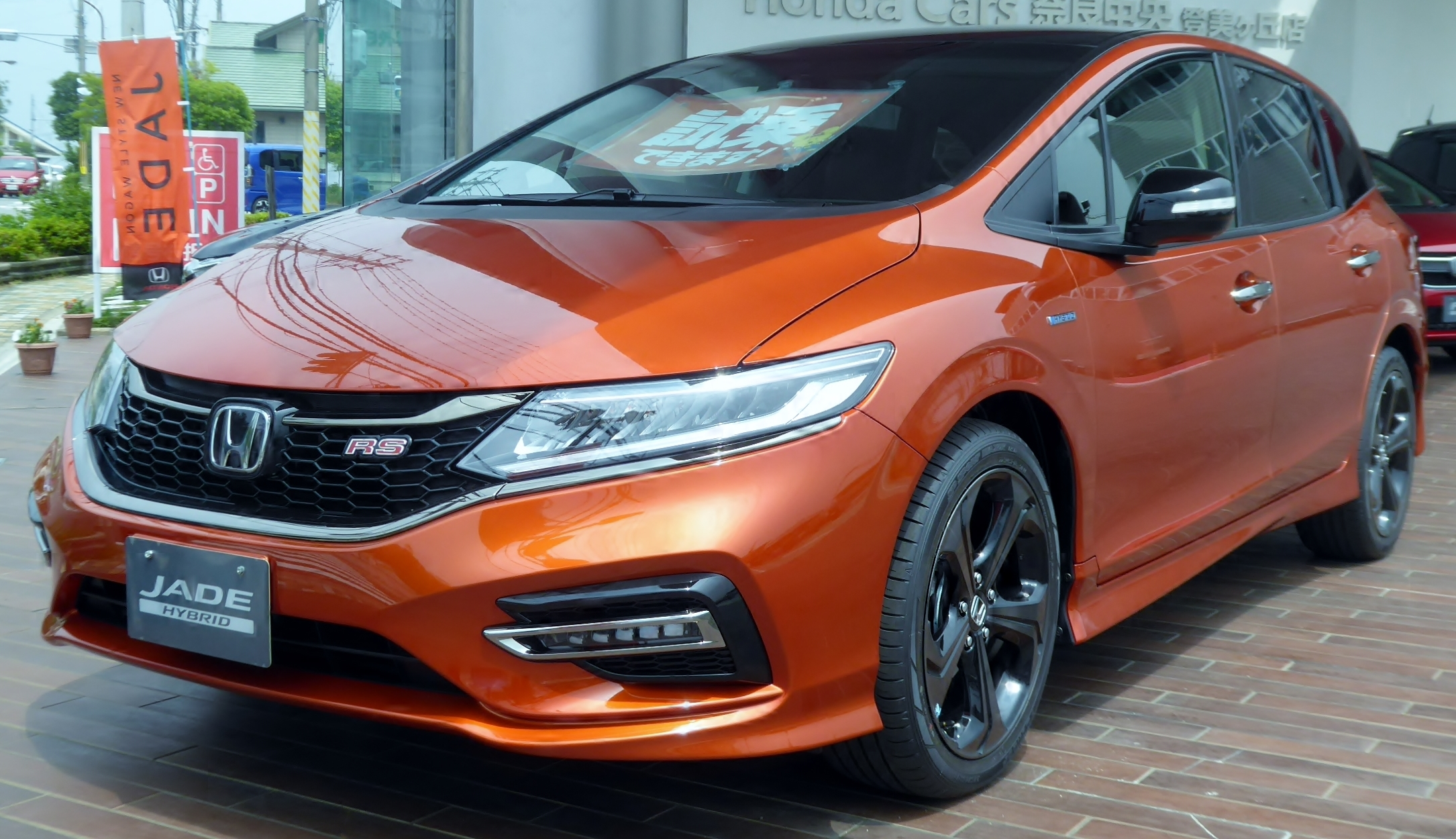
Honda Jade Hybrid RS (Japan; facelift)

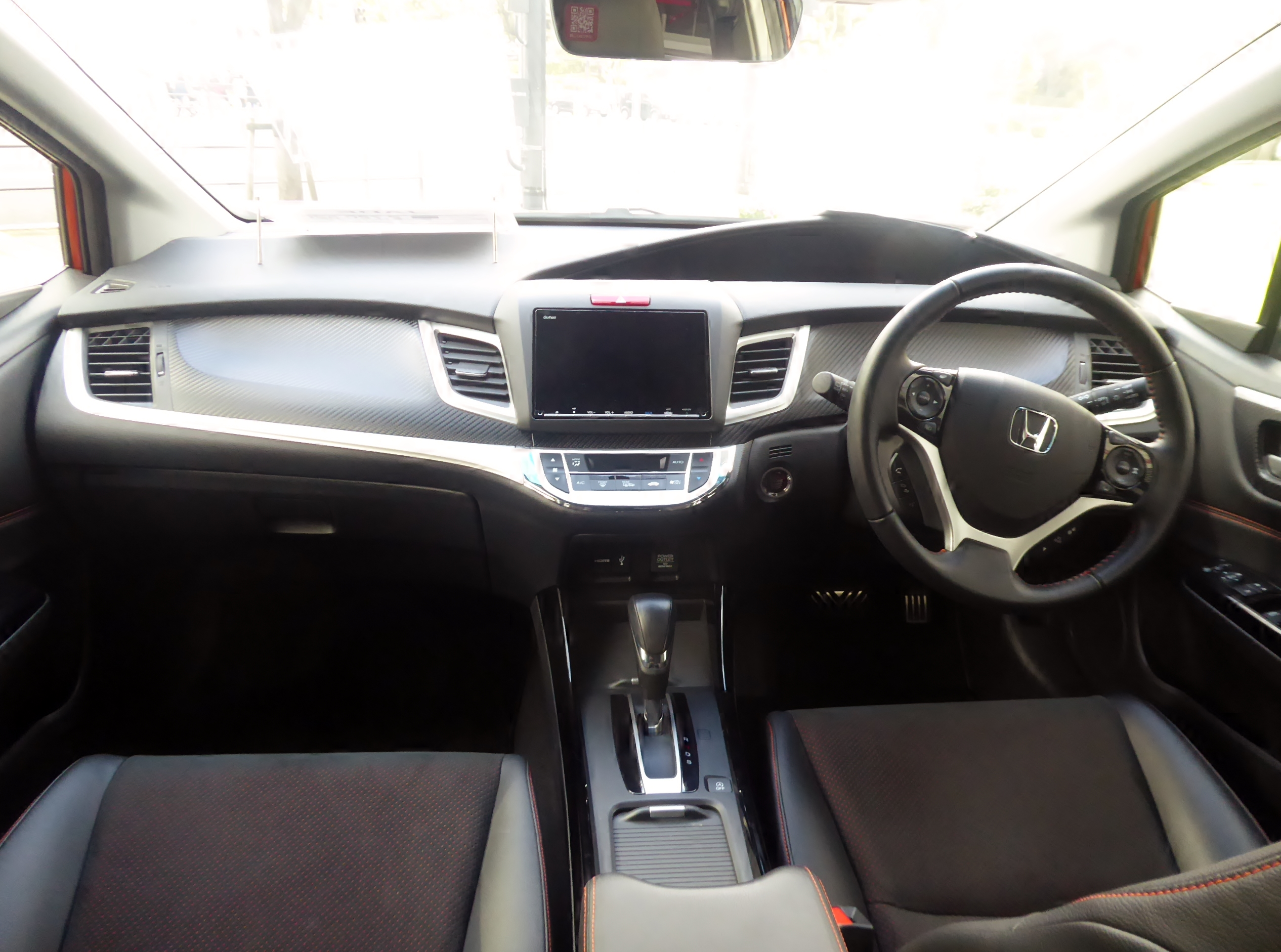
Honda Jade RS interior (Japan; facelift)

== Sales ==
Year	Japan	China
2014		49,351
2015	12,656	51,289
2016	6,520	33,532
2017	1,991	42,249
2018	4,285	41,714
2019	3,003	15,409
2020	1,027	1,991
