= Honda L engine =

Inline-four engine

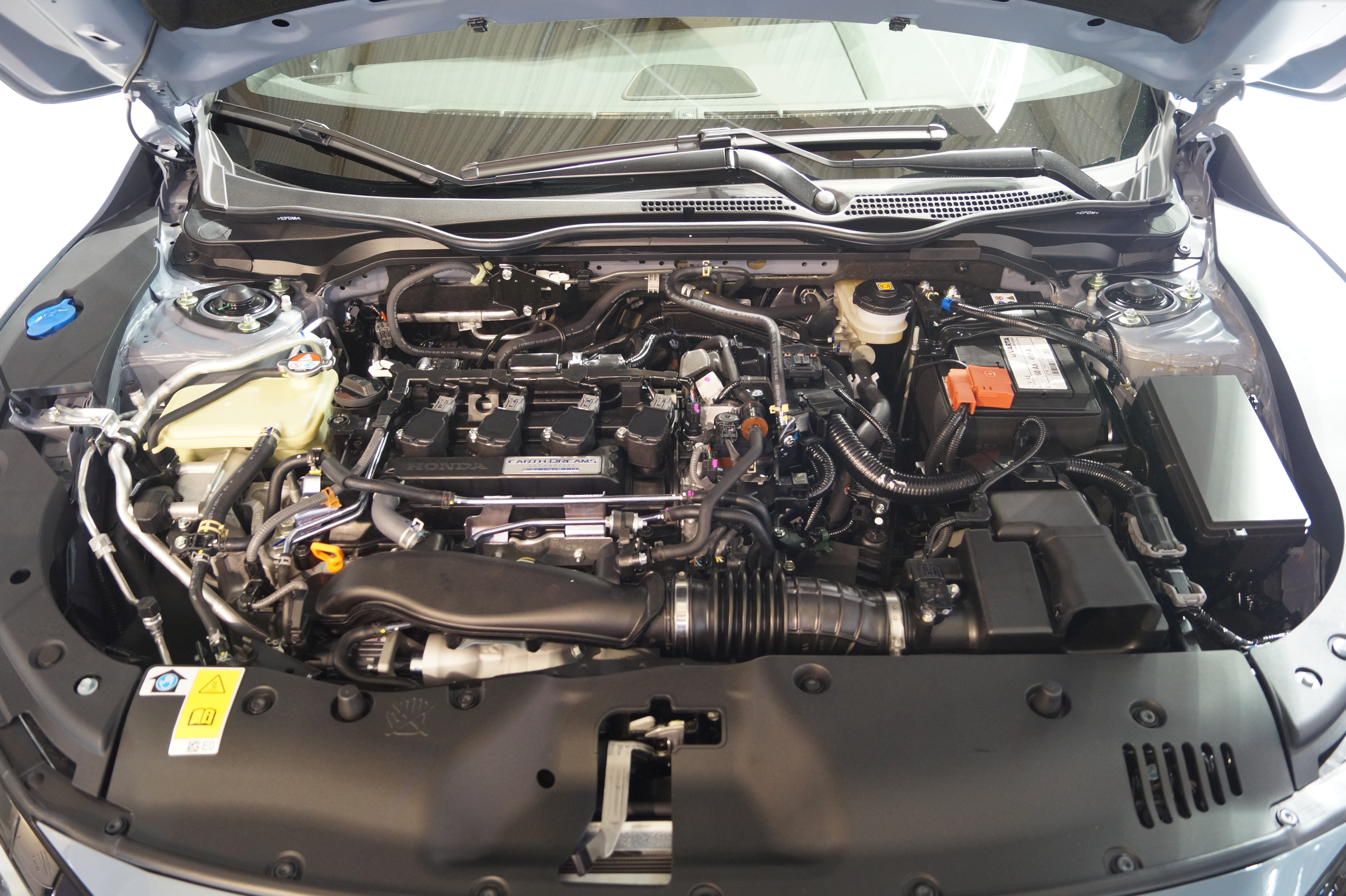

Overview
- Manufacturer: Honda
- Production: 2001–present

Layout
- Configuration: Inline-4
- Displacement: 1.2–1.5 L; 73.1–91.4 cu in (1,198–1,497 cc)
- Cylinder bore: 73 mm (2.87 in)
- Piston stroke: 71.58 mm (2.82 in); 74.4 mm (2.93 in); 78.7 mm (3.10 in); 80 mm (3.15 in); 89.4 mm (3.52 in)
- Valvetrain: SOHC 2 valves x cyl. with i-DSI; SOHC & DOHC 4 valves x cyl. with VTEC / i-VTEC
- Compression ratio: 10.2:1-13.5:1

Combustion
- Turbocharger: MHI-TD03 (on some versions)
- Fuel system: PGM-FI Direct injection
- Management: Bosch or Keihin
- Fuel type: Gasoline
- Cooling system: Water-cooled

Output
- Power output: 78–208 PS (57–153 kW; 77–205 hp)
- Torque output: 110–260 N⋅m (81–192 lb⋅ft)

The L-series is a compact inline-four engine created by Honda, introduced in 2001 with the Honda Fit. It has 1.2 L (1,198 cc), 1.3 L (1,318 cc) and 1.5 litres (1,497 cc) displacement variants, which utilize the names L12A, L13A and L15A. Depending on the region, these engines are sold throughout the world in the 5-door Honda Brio Fit/Jazz hatchback Honda Civic and the 4-door Fit Aria/City sedan (also known as Fit Saloon). They can also be found in the Japanese-only Airwave wagon and Mobilio MPV.

Two different valvetrains are present on this engine series. The L12A, L13A and L15A use (Japanese: i-DSI), or “intelligent Dual & Sequential Ignition”. i-DSI utilizes two spark plugs per cylinder which fire at different intervals during the combustion process to achieve a more complete burn of the gasoline. This process allows the engine to have more power while keeping fuel consumption low, thanks to the better gasoline utilization. Emissions are also reduced. The i-DSI engines have two to five valves per cylinder and a modest redline of only 6,000 rpm, but reach maximum torque at mid-range rpm, allowing for better performance without having to rev the engine at high speeds. The i-DSI is also known for not using Turbochargers in the performance category, as it uses a high compression, long stroke with a lightweight and compact engine.

The other valvetrain in use is the VTEC on one of the two varieties of the L15A. This engine is aimed more at performance than efficiency with a slightly higher redline with 4 valves per cylinder, which reaches peak torque at higher rpm. However, it still offers a good combination of both performance and fuel efficiency. Both the i-DSI and VTEC have relatively high compression ratios at 10.8:1 and 10.4:1, respectively.

Before April 2006, the L-series were exclusively available with a 5-speed manual transmission, continuously variable transmission (CVT). With the introduction of the Fit in Canada and the United States, an L-series engine was mated to a traditional automatic transmission with a torque converter for the first time. The L12A i-DSI is available exclusively in the European domestic market Jazz and is sold with only a 5-speed manual transmission.

As of 2010, the L15A7 (i-VTEC) is a class legal engine choice for SCCA sanctioned Formula F competition, joining the 1.6L Ford Kent engine.

In 2016 Honda introduced the L15B (DOHC-VTC-TURBO-VTEC) engine as part of their continuing global "Earth Dreams" strategy for lower emissions and higher fuel economy for a range of their cars, available with 6-speed manual and CVT transmissions with Earth Dreams Technology.

== L12 ==
=== L12A i-DSI ===
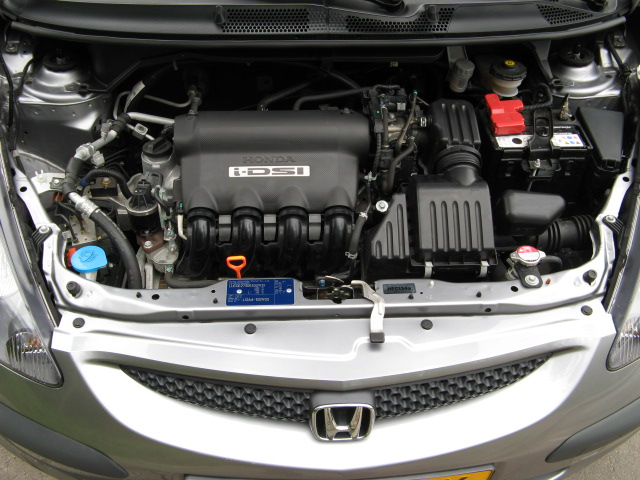
Stock L12A i-DSI engine

- Available exclusively in the European domestic market Jazz and available with only a 5-speed manual transmission.
  - Displacement: 1.2 L; 76.0 cu in (1,246 cc)
  - Bore x stroke: 73 mm × 74.4 mm (2.87 in × 2.93 in)
  - Compression ratio: 10.8:1
  - Power: 78 PS (57 kW; 77 hp) at 5,700 rpm
  - Torque: 110 N⋅m (81 lb⋅ft) at 2,800 rpm
  - Variations: L12A1
  - SOHC 8 valves
  - 8 spark plugs, 2 per cylinder
- Application:
  - Honda Jazz (Europe, 2002-2008)
  - Honda City (Pakistan, 2002-2008)

=== L12B1 i-VTEC ===
- SOHC 16 valve i-VTEC
  - Displacement: 1.2 L; 73.1 cu in (1,198 cc)
  - Bore x stroke: 73 mm × 71.58 mm (2.87 in × 2.82 in)
  - Compression ratio: 10.2:1
  - Power: 90 PS (66 kW; 89 hp) at 6,200 rpm
  - Torque: 114 N⋅m (84 lb⋅ft) at 4,900 rpm
  - CO_{2} emission: 125 g (4.4 oz)/km
  - rpmLock: 6,500 rpm
  - SpeedLock: 145 km/h (90 mph)
  - ECU: Bosch, Keihin
- Applications:
  - Honda Jazz (Europe, 2008–2013)

=== L12B3 i-VTEC ===
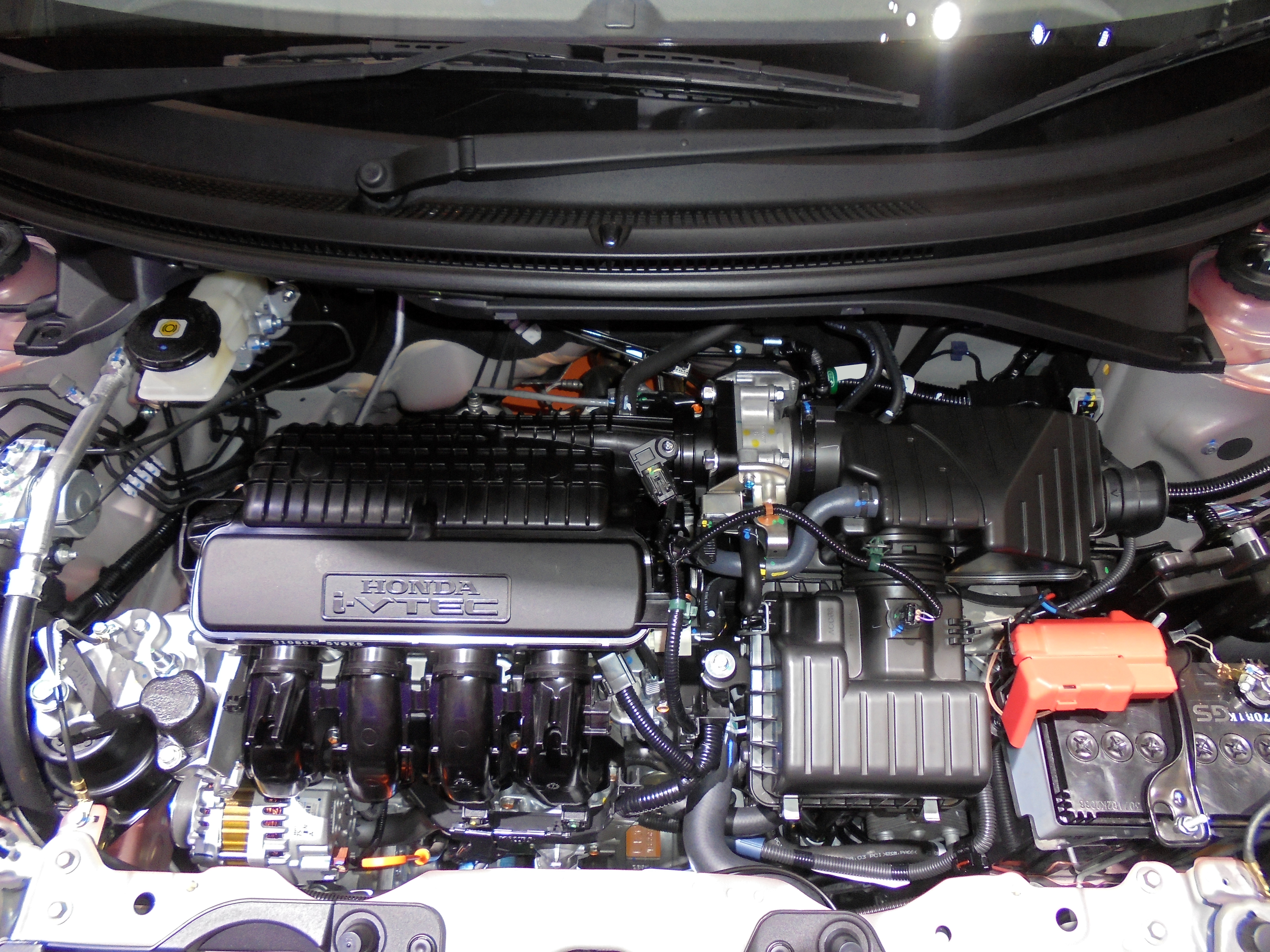
L12B3

- SOHC 16 valve i-VTEC
  - Displacement: 1.2 L; 73.1 cu in (1,198 cc)
  - Bore x stroke: 73 mm × 71.58 mm (2.87 in × 2.82 in)
  - Compression ratio: 10.2:1
  - Power: 90 PS (66 kW; 89 hp) at 6,000 rpm
  - Torque: 110 N⋅m (81 lb⋅ft) at 4,800 rpm
  - SpeedLock: 145 km/h (90 mph)
- Applications:
  - Honda Brio (Southeast Asia, 2011–present)
  - Honda Brio Amaze (Southeast Asia, 2013–2020)
  - Honda City (Pakistan, 2021–present)

=== L12B4 i-VTEC ===
- SOHC 16 valve i-VTEC
  - Displacement: 1.2 L; 73.1 cu in (1,198 cc)
  - Bore x stroke: 73 mm × 71.58 mm (2.87 in × 2.82 in)
  - Compression ratio: 10.2:1
  - Power: 90 PS (66 kW; 89 hp) at 6,000 rpm
  - Torque: 110 N⋅m (81 lb⋅ft) at 4,800 rpm
- Applications:
  - Honda Brio Amaze (India, 2018–present)
  - Honda Jazz (GK7) (India, 2015–2022)

== L13 ==
=== L13A i-DSI ===
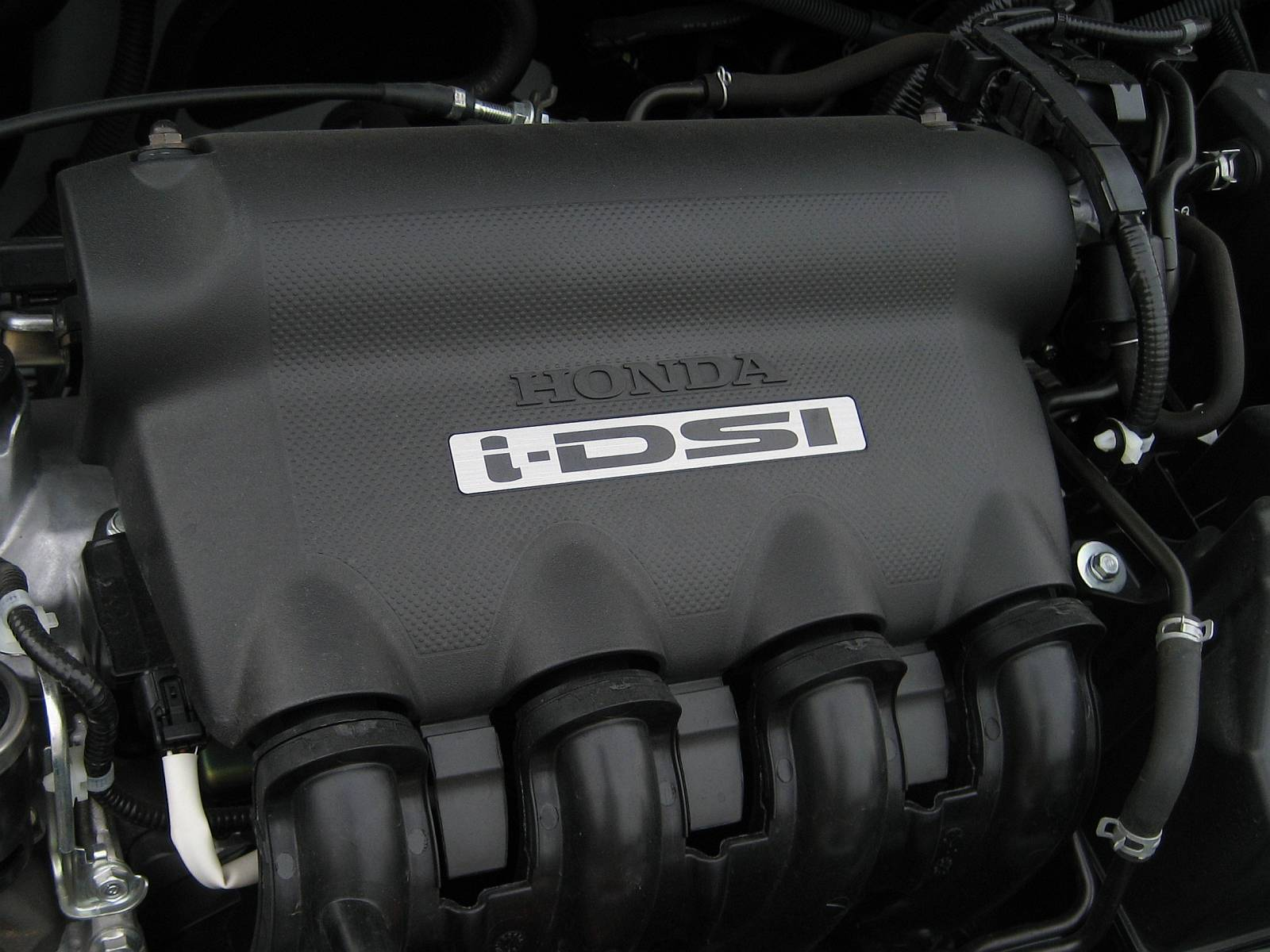
L13A i-DSI

- Sold as a 1.3 in the Japanese Fit/Fit Aria. European Civic 1.4 i-DSI has a standard 6-speed manual with an available 6-speed automated manual I-SHIFT transmission.
- For 7th gen Civic, City, Fit & Jazz Models
  - Displacement: 1.3 L; 81.7 cu in (1,339 cc)
  - Bore x stroke: 73 mm × 80 mm (2.87 in × 3.15 in)
  - Compression ratio: 10.8:1
  - Horsepower: 83 PS (61 kW; 82 hp) at 5700 rpm (Europe)

- 86 PS (63 kW; 85 hp) at 5700 rpm (Japan)

  - Torque: 119 N⋅m (88 lb⋅ft) at 2800 rpm
  - Variations: L13A1 (Fit/Jazz), L13A7 (European market Civic), L13A8 (European market City)
- For 8th gen Civic
  - Displacement: 1.3 L; 81.7 cu in (1,339 cc)
  - Bore x stroke: 73 mm × 80 mm (2.87 in × 3.15 in)
  - Horsepower: 95 PS (70 kW; 94 hp)
  - Torque: 123 N⋅m (91 lb⋅ft)
  - CO_{2} emission: 109 g (3.8 oz)/km (for the Honda Civic Hybrid)

=== L13Z i-VTEC ===
- Available in the second generation Honda Fit (Japan series GE6 / GE7), Honda Airwave in Japan, and the European Honda Civic.
  - SOHC 16 valve i-VTEC
  - Displacement: 1.3 L; 81.7 cu in (1,339 cc)
  - Bore x stroke: 73 mm × 80 mm (2.87 in × 3.15 in)
  - Compression ratio: 10.5:1
  - Horsepower: 100 PS (74 kW; 99 hp) at 6,500 rpm
  - Torque: 127 N⋅m (94 lb⋅ft) at 4,800 rpm
  - source Honda│クルマ│フィット│スペック

=== L13B i-VTEC ===
- DOHC 16 valve i-VTEC
- Displacement: 1.3 L; 80.4 cu in (1,318 cc)
- Bore x stroke: 73 mm × 78.7 mm (2.87 in × 3.10 in)
- Compression: 13.5:1
- Power: 100 PS (74 kW; 99 hp) at 6,000 rpm
- Torque: 119 N⋅m (88 lb⋅ft) at 5,000 rpm (GK3 Fit)
- Top Speed: 180 km/h (110 mph)
  - Honda Fit (Japan series GK3/4)

=== L13Z1 i-VTEC ===
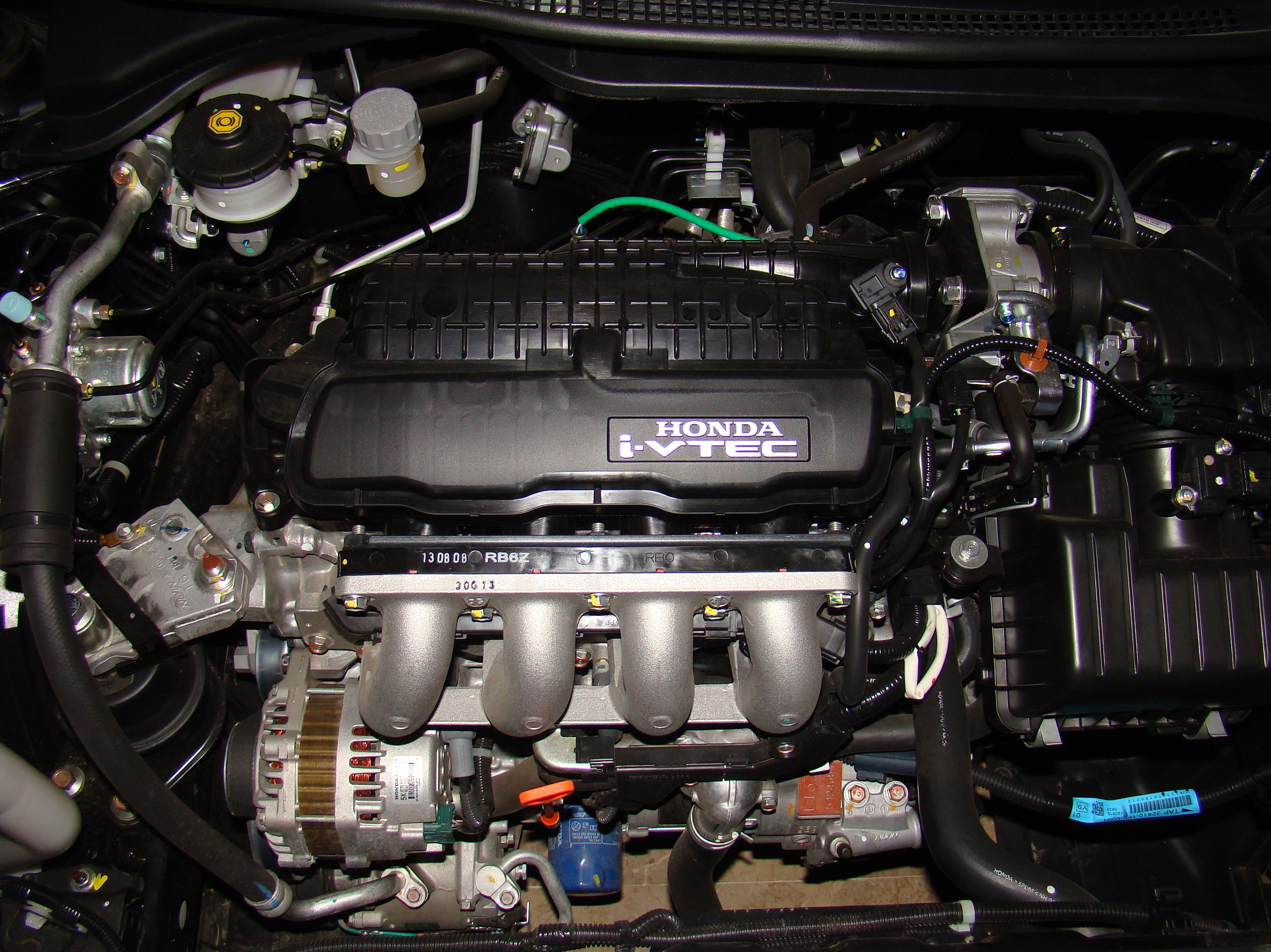
L13Z1 i-VTEC in Fifth Gen Honda City Pakistan

  - SOHC 16 valve i-VTEC
  - Displacement: 1.3 L; 81.7 cu in (1,339 cc)
  - Bore x stroke: 73 mm × 80 mm (2.87 in × 3.15 in)
  - Compression ratio: 10.5:1
  - Power: 100 PS (74 kW; 99 hp) at 6,000 rpm
  - Torque: 128 N⋅m (94 lb⋅ft) at 4,800 rpm
  - Speed Limiter: 195 km/h (121 mph)
- Applications:
  - Honda Brio (2011–2014)
  - Honda City (Pakistan)
  - Honda Jazz (UK) (2008-2016)
  - Honda Civic (UK) (2008-2016)

== L15A ==
=== L15A (i-VTEC / CNG) ===
This engine has been used since 2007 in Honda City CNG

- SOHC 16 valve i-VTEC
  - Displacement: 1.5 L; 91.4 cu in (1,497 cc)
  - Bore x stroke: 73 mm × 89.4 mm (2.87 in × 3.52 in)
  - Compression ratio: 10.4:1
  - Power: 102 PS (75 kW; 101 hp) at 6,600 rpm
  - Torque: 127 N⋅m (94 lb⋅ft) at 4,800 rpm
  - CO_{2} emission: 148 g (5.2 oz)/km
- Honda City CNG (Thailand)

=== L15A2 i-DSI ===
It debuted in Honda City/Fit Aria four door Sport-sedan in November 2002.

- Offered in the Fit Aria and Partner in Japan.
  - Displacement: 1.5 L; 91.4 cu in (1,497 cc)
  - Bore x stroke: 73 mm × 89.4 mm (2.87 in × 3.52 in)
  - Compression ratio: 10.8:1
  - Power: 90 PS (66 kW; 89 hp) at 5,500 rpm
  - Torque: 131 N⋅m (97 lb⋅ft) at 2,700 rpm

=== L15A1 VTEC ===
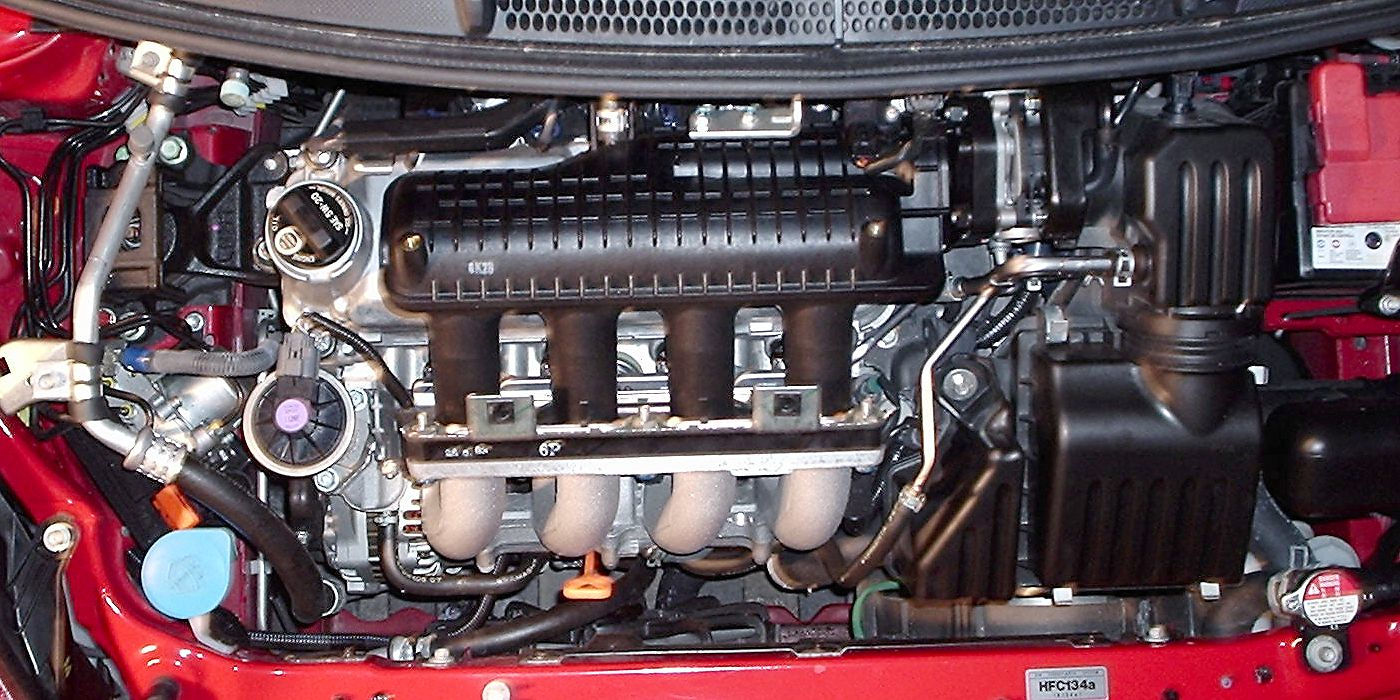
Stock L15A1-VTEC engine

It debuted in JDM Fit and Mobilio Spike in September 2002.

- Available in the Fit, Fit Aria, Airwave, Mobilio, and Mobilio Spike in Japan. Sold throughout the world with 5-speed manual or CVT options in the Fit/Jazz, Airwave and City. Canadian and US Fit models offered a 5-speed automatic instead of the CVT.
  - Displacement: 1.5 L; 91.4 cu in (1,497 cc)
  - Bore x stroke: 73 mm × 89.4 mm (2.87 in × 3.52 in)
  - Compression ratio: 10.4:1
  - Power: 111 PS (82 kW; 109 hp) at 5,800 rpm
  - Torque: 143 N⋅m (105 lb⋅ft) at 4,000 rpm

=== L15A7 ===
This engine has been used since 2009 in the 2nd Gen Honda Jazz

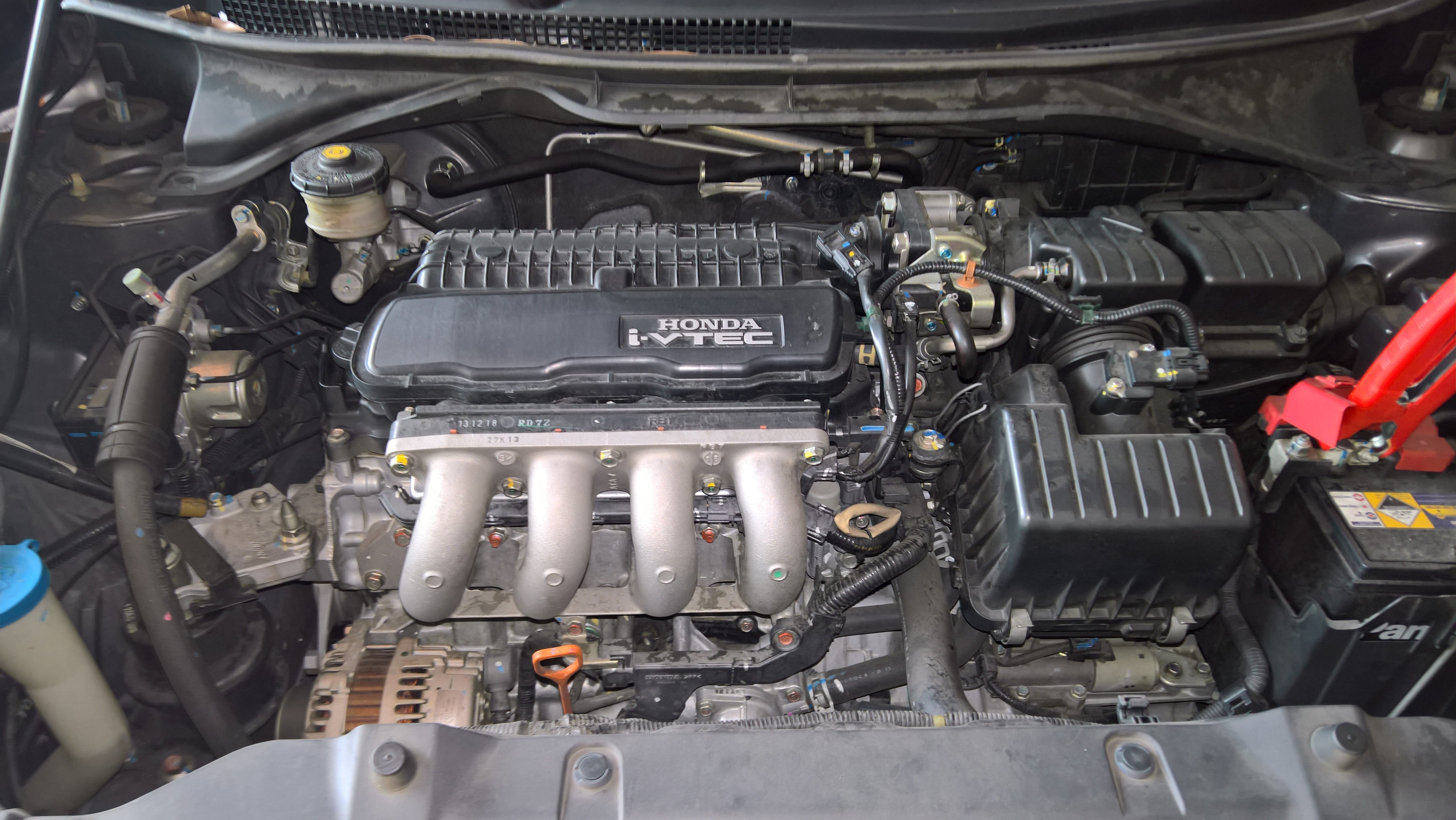
L15A7

- SOHC 16 valve i-VTEC
  - Displacement: 1.5 L; 91.4 cu in (1,497 cc)
  - Bore x stroke: 73 mm × 89.4 mm (2.87 in × 3.52 in)
  - Compression ratio: 10.4:1
  - Power: 120 PS (88 kW; 118 hp) at 6,600 rpm
  - Torque: 145 N⋅m (107 lb⋅ft) at 4,300 rpm (GE8 Fit)
  - CO_{2} emission: 148 g (5.2 oz)/km
- Honda Fit (Japan series GE8 / 9)
- Honda Jazz (Brazil, Thailand GE8 / 9)
- Honda Freed (Japan series GB3 / 4)
- Honda City (India, Brazil, Pakistan, Thailand, Malaysia, ASEAN)
- Optional engine in any Sports Car Club of America Formula Ford 1600 chassis. As of this time, the engine is only legal for Formula F racing in the United States in series that use the Ford Kent engine. It is not legal in other markets using Formula F chassis where the Ford Kent engine is standard.

== L15B & L15C ==
=== L15B (Earth Dreams + i-VTEC) ===
Honda L15B (Earth Dreams i-VTEC)
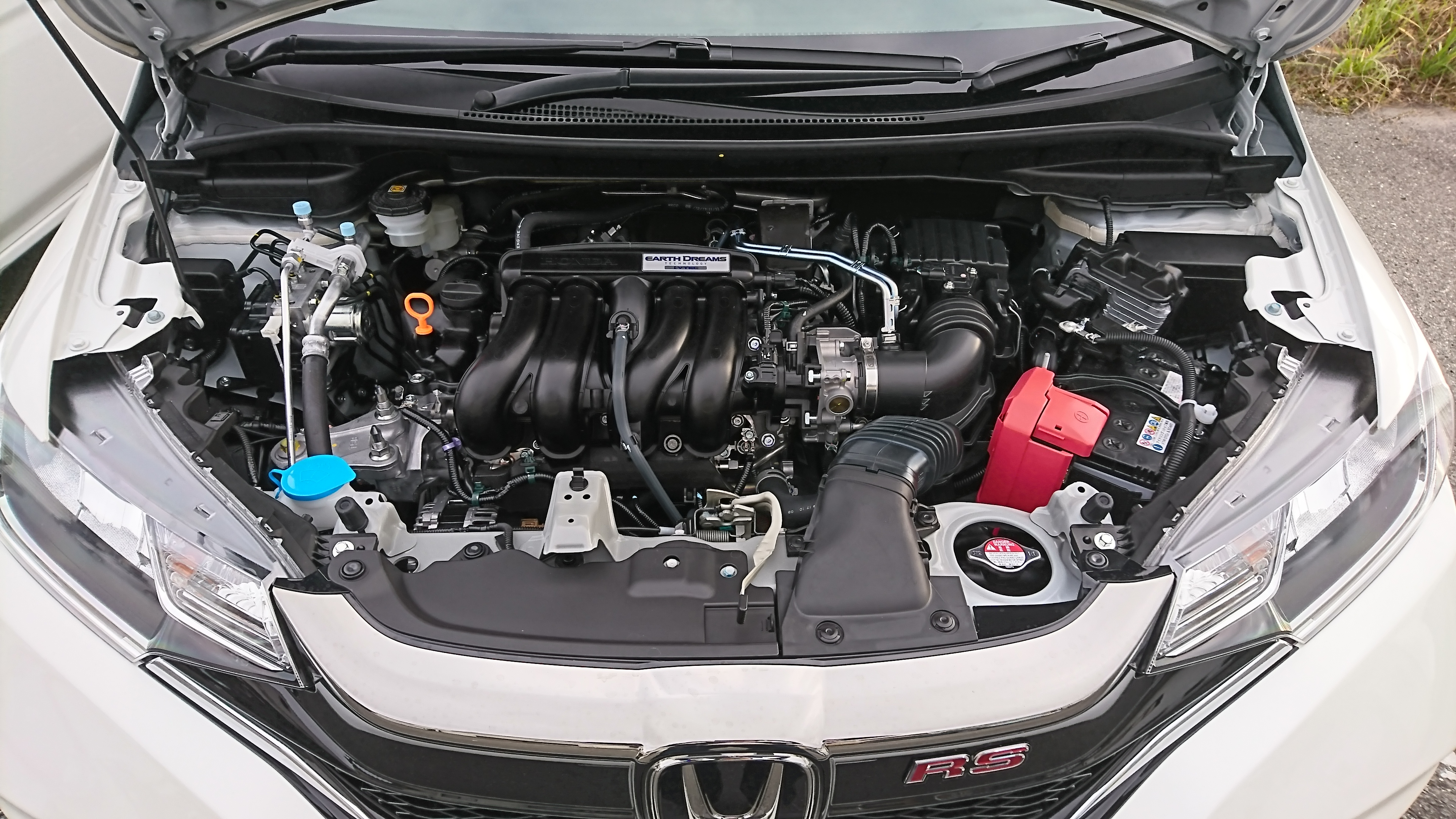

Overview
- Manufacturer: Honda Motor Co., Ltd.
- Production: 2013–present

Layout
- Configuration: I4
- Displacement: 1.5 L; 91.4 cu in (1,497 cc)
- Cylinder bore: 73 mm (2.87 in)
- Piston stroke: 89.4 mm (3.52 in)
- Valvetrain: DOHC
- Compression ratio: See table for specific application

Combustion
- Fuel system: Direct fuel injection
- Management: ECU
- Fuel type: Gasoline
- Cooling system: Water-cooled

Output
- Power output: See table for specific application
- Torque output: See table for specific application

Applications

Engine	Application	Compression	Power	Torque
L15B (JDM)	2013–2019 Honda Fit (GK5/GK6) (Japan)	11.5:1	132 PS (130 hp; 97 kW) at 6600 rpm	155 N⋅m (114 lb⋅ft) at 4600 rpm
L15B (JDM)	2014–2020 Honda Vezel (RU1/RU2) (Japan)	11.5:1	129 PS (127 hp; 95 kW) at 6600 rpm	155 N⋅m (114 lb⋅ft) at 4600 rpm
L15B (JDM)	2016–present Honda Freed (GB5/GB6) (Japan)	11.5:1	131 PS (129 hp; 96 kW) at 6600 rpm	155 N⋅m (114 lb⋅ft) at 4600 rpm
L15B (JDM)	2015–present Honda Shuttle (GK8/GK9) (Japan)	11.5:1	132 PS (130 hp; 97 kW) at 6600 rpm	155 N⋅m (114 lb⋅ft) at 4600 rpm
L15B1	2013–2019 Honda Fit/Jazz (GK5/GK6)	11.5:1	132 PS (130 hp; 97 kW) at 6600 rpm	155 N⋅m (114 lb⋅ft) at 4600 rpm
L15B4	2014–2020 Honda HR-V (RU1/RU2)	11.5:1	132 PS (130 hp; 97 kW) at 6600 rpm	155 N⋅m (114 lb⋅ft) at 4600 rpm
L15BU	2020–present Honda Fit/Jazz/Life (GR9/GS1)	11.5:1	132 PS (130 hp; 97 kW) at 6600 rpm	155 N⋅m (114 lb⋅ft) at 4600 rpm

=== L15B & L15C (Earth Dreams VTC/VTEC Turbo) ===
Honda L15B & L15C (Earth Dreams VTC/VTEC Turbo)
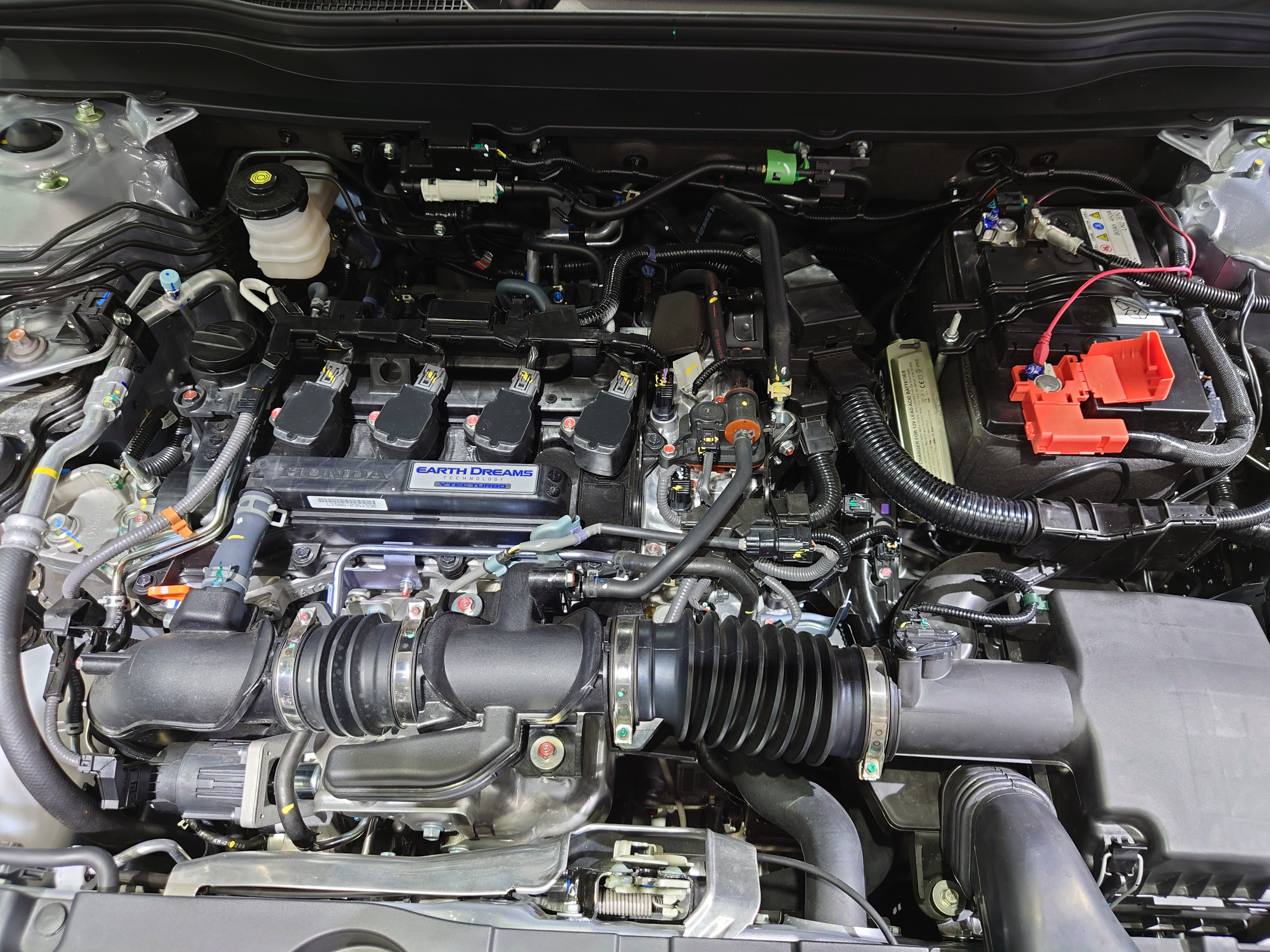

Overview
- Manufacturer: Honda Motor Co., Ltd.
- Production: 2015–present

Layout
- Configuration: I4
- Displacement: 1.5 L; 91.4 cu in (1,497 cc)
- Cylinder bore: 73 mm (2.87 in)
- Piston stroke: 89.4 mm (3.52 in)
- Valvetrain: DOHC
- Compression ratio: See left for specific application.

Combustion
- Turbocharger: 1
- Fuel system: Gasoline direct injection
- Management: ECU
- Fuel type: Gasoline
- Cooling system: Water-cooled

Output
- Power output: See left for specific application.
- Torque output: See left for specific application.

Applications

Engine	Application	Valve system	Compression	Boost pressure	Power	Torque	Redline
L15B7	2016–2021 Honda Civic Sedan/Coupe (FC1/FC3)	VTC	10.6:1	16.5 psi (1.14 bar)	176 PS (129 kW; 174 hp) at 6000 rpm	220 N⋅m (162 lb⋅ft) at 1700–5500 rpm	6500 rpm
L15B7	2016–2021 Honda Civic Hatchback (FK4) (Asia and Oceania exclude Japan)	VTC	10.6:1	16.5 psi (1.14 bar)	176 PS (129 kW; 174 hp) at 6000 rpm	220 N⋅m (162 lb⋅ft) at 1700–5500 rpm	6500 rpm
L15B7	2016–2021 Honda Civic Sedan/Coupe Si (FC1/FC3)	VTC	10.3:1	20.3 psi (1.40 bar)	205 hp (153 kW) @ 5700 rpm	192 lb⋅ft (260 N⋅m) @ 2100–5000 rpm	6500 rpm
L15B7	2022–present Honda Civic Sedan/Hatchback (FE1/FL1)	VTEC	10.3:1	16.5 psi (1.14 bar)	180 hp (134 kW) @ 5700 rpm	177 lb⋅ft (240 N⋅m) @ 1700–4500 rpm	6600 rpm
L15B8	2016–2021 Honda Civic Sedan/Hatchback (FC1/FK7) (China)	VTC	10.6:1		174 hp (130 kW) @ 6000 rpm	162 lb⋅ft (220 N⋅m) @ 1700–5500 rpm	6500 rpm
L15B9	2016–present Acura CDX (China)	VTC	10.6:1		182 hp (136 kW) @ 5500 rpm	177 lb⋅ft (240 N⋅m) @ 1900–5500 rpm	6500 rpm
L15BA	2016–2021 Honda Civic Hatchback (FK7) (North America LX and EX trim)	VTC	10.6:1	16.5 psi (1.14 bar)	174 hp (130 kW) @ 6000 rpm	162 lb⋅ft (220 N⋅m) @ 1700–5500 rpm	6600 rpm
L15BA	2016–2021 Honda Civic Hatchback (FK7) (Europe and North America Sport/Sport Touring trim)	VTC	10.6:1	16.5 psi (1.14 bar)	CVT 180 hp (134 kW) @ 6000 rpm	CVT 162 lb⋅ft (220 N⋅m) @ 1700–5500 rpm	6600 rpm
L15BA	2016–2021 Honda Civic Hatchback (FK7) (Europe and North America Sport/Sport Touring trim)	VTC	10.6:1	16.5 psi (1.14 bar)	6MT 180 hp (134 kW) @ 5500 rpm	6MT 177 lb⋅ft (240 N⋅m) @ 1900–5500 rpm	6600 rpm
L15BD	2016–present Honda Avancier (TG1)	VTC	10.3:1		190 hp (142 kW) @ 5600 rpm	179 lb⋅ft (243 N⋅m) @ 2000–5500 rpm	6500 rpm
L15BD	2016–present Honda UR-V (TG4)	VTC	10.3:1		190 hp (142 kW) @ 5600 rpm	243 N⋅m (179 lb⋅ft) at 2000–5500 rpm	6500 rpm
L15BE	2017–2022 Honda CR-V (RW1/RW2)	VTC	10.3:1	18.5 psi (1.28 bar)	190 hp (142 kW) @ 5600 rpm	179 lb⋅ft (243 N⋅m) @ 2000–5500 rpm	
L15BE	2023–present Honda CR-V (RS3/RS4)	VTEC	10.3:1		190 hp (142 kW) @ 6000 rpm	179 lb⋅ft (243 N⋅m) @ 1700–5000 rpm	6600 rpm
L15BE	2018–2022 Honda Accord (CV1)	VTEC	10.3:1	20.2 psi (1.39 bar)	192 hp (143 kW) @ 5500 rpm	192 lb⋅ft (260 N⋅m) @ 1600–5000 rpm	6500 rpm
L15BE	2023–present Honda Accord (CY1)	VTEC	10.6:1		192 hp (143 kW) @ 6000 rpm	192 lb⋅ft (260 N⋅m) @ 1700–5000 rpm	6500 rpm
L15BF	2015–2019 Honda Jade (FR5)	VTC	10.6:1	8.7 psi (0.60 bar)	150 hp (112 kW) @ 5500 rpm	151 lb⋅ft (205 N⋅m) @ 1600–5000 rpm	6500 rpm
L15BG (FFV)	2018–present Honda Accord (CV1) (Thailand)	VTEC	10.3:1		187 hp (139 kW) @ 5500 rpm	179 lb⋅ft (243 N⋅m) @ 2000–5500 rpm	6500 rpm
L15BG (FFV)	2022–present Honda Civic Sedan (FE1)	VTEC	10.3:1		176 hp (131 kW) @ 6000 rpm	177 lb⋅ft (240 N⋅m) @ 1700–4500 rpm	6600 rpm
L15BJ	2022–present Honda Civic Sedan (FE1)(Singapore)	VTEC	10.3:1		127 hp (95 kW) @ 6000 rpm	133 lb⋅ft (180 N⋅m) @ 1700–4500 rpm	6600 rpm
L15BL	2017–present Honda CR-V (RW1/RW2) (China)	VTC	10.3:1		190 hp (142 kW) @ 5600 rpm	179 lb⋅ft (243 N⋅m) @ 2000–5500 rpm	6500 rpm
L15BM	2018–2020 Honda Accord (CV1) (China 230 TURBO trim)	VTC	10.6:1		174 hp (130 kW) @ 5500 rpm	170 lb⋅ft (230 N⋅m) @ 1500–3000 rpm	6600 rpm
L15BN	2018–present Honda Accord (CV1) (China 260 TURBO trim)	VTEC	10.3:1		192 hp (143 kW) @ 5500 rpm	192 lb⋅ft (260 N⋅m) @ 1600–5000 rpm	6500 rpm
L15BP	2018–present Honda Vezel (RU1) (China 220 TURBO trim)	VTC	10.6:1		174 hp (130 kW) @ 6000 rpm	162 lb⋅ft (220 N⋅m) @ 1700–5500 rpm	
L15BR	2018–present Honda Inspire (CV1) (China)	VTEC	10.3:1		192 hp (143 kW) @ 5500 rpm	192 lb⋅ft (260 N⋅m) @ 1600–5000 rpm	6500 rpm
L15BS	2018–present Honda XR-V (RU1) (China 220 TURBO trim)	VTC	10.6:1		174 hp (130 kW) @ 6000 rpm	162 lb⋅ft (220 N⋅m) @ 1700–5500 rpm	
L15BT	2017–present Honda Breeze (RY1/RY2) (China)	VTC	10.3:1		190 hp (142 kW) @ 5600 rpm	179 lb⋅ft (243 N⋅m) @ 2000–5500 rpm	6500 rpm
L15BY	2018–2020 Honda HR-V (RU1) (Europe Sport Turbo trim)	VTC	10.6:1		180 hp (134 kW) @ 5000 rpm	CVT 162 lb⋅ft (220 N⋅m) @ 1700–5500 rpm	6600 rpm
L15BY	2018–2020 Honda HR-V (RU1) (Europe Sport Turbo trim)	VTC	10.6:1		180 hp (134 kW) @ 5000 rpm	6MT 177 lb⋅ft (240 N⋅m) @ 1900–5500 rpm	6600 rpm
L15BY	2018–2023 Honda CR-V (RW1/RW2) (Europe)	VTC	10.6:1		CVT 193 PS (142 kW; 190 hp) at 5600 rpm	CVT 243 N⋅m (179 lb⋅ft) at 2000–5000 rpm	
L15BY	2018–2023 Honda CR-V (RW1/RW2) (Europe)	VTC	10.6:1		6MT 173 PS (127 kW; 171 hp) at 5600 rpm	6MT 220 N⋅m (162 lb⋅ft) at 1900–5000 rpm	
L15C	2016–2021 Honda Civic Hatchback (FK7) (Japan)	VTC	10.6:1		CVT 182 PS (134 kW; 180 hp) at 6000 rpm	CVT 220 N⋅m (162 lb⋅ft) at 1700–5500 rpm	
L15C	2016–2021 Honda Civic Hatchback (FK7) (Japan)	VTC	10.6:1		6MT 182 PS (134 kW; 180 hp) at 5500 rpm	6MT 240 N⋅m (177 lb⋅ft) at 1900–5000 rpm	
L15C	2022–present Honda Civic Hatchback (FL1) (Japan)	VTEC	10.3:1		182 PS (134 kW; 180 hp) at 6000 rpm	240 N⋅m (177 lb⋅ft) at 1700–4500 rpm	
L15C1	2022–present Honda HR-V (RV3) (RS Turbo trim)	VTEC	10.3:1	14.5 psi (1.00 bar)	177 PS (130 kW; 175 hp) at 6000 rpm	240 N⋅m (177 lb⋅ft) at 1700–4500 rpm	
L15C2 (FFV)	2023–present Honda CR-V (RS3/RS4) (Thailand)	VTEC	10.3:1		190 hp (142 kW) @ 6000 rpm	177 lb⋅ft (240 N⋅m) @ 1700–5000 rpm	
L15C3	2022–present Honda HR-V (RV3) (Malaysia Turbo trim)	VTEC	10.3:1		181 hp (135 kW) @ 6000 rpm	177 lb⋅ft (240 N⋅m) @ 1700–4500 rpm	
L15C7	2022–present Honda Civic Sedan (FE1) (China 180 TURBO trim)	VTEC	10.3:1		127 hp (95 kW) @ 5500-6000 rpm	133 lb⋅ft (180 N⋅m) @ 1700–4500 rpm	
L15C8	2022–present Honda Civic Sedan (FE1) (China 240 TURBO trim)	VTEC	10.3:1		180 hp (134 kW) @ 6000 rpm	177 lb⋅ft (240 N⋅m) @ 1700–4500 rpm	
L15C9	2022–present Honda Integra (FE1) (China)	VTEC	10.3:1		190 hp (142 kW) @ 6000 rpm	177 lb⋅ft (240 N⋅m) @ 1700–4500 rpm	
L15CA	2022–present Honda Civic Si (FE1) 2023–present Acura Integra (DE4)	VTEC	10.3:1	17.8 psi (1.23 bar)	200 hp (149 kW) @ 6000 rpm	192 lb⋅ft (260 N⋅m) @ 1800–5000 rpm	

Additional notes

- Turbocharged L15B/L15C engines that feature VTC system have Variable Timing Control (VTC) on both the intake and exhaust side. It was advertised and badged as VTEC Turbo in Australia and some Asian markets, despite not featuring an actual Variable Valve Lift system like conventional VTEC engines.
- Turbocharged L15B/L15C engines that feature VTEC system come with an addition of Variable Valve lift, but unlike Naturally aspirated engine VTEC. It exists on the exhaust cam side only
- L15BG and L15C2 engine is flex fuel capable up to E85
- L15BJ engine is a downtuned version of the L15BG engine.
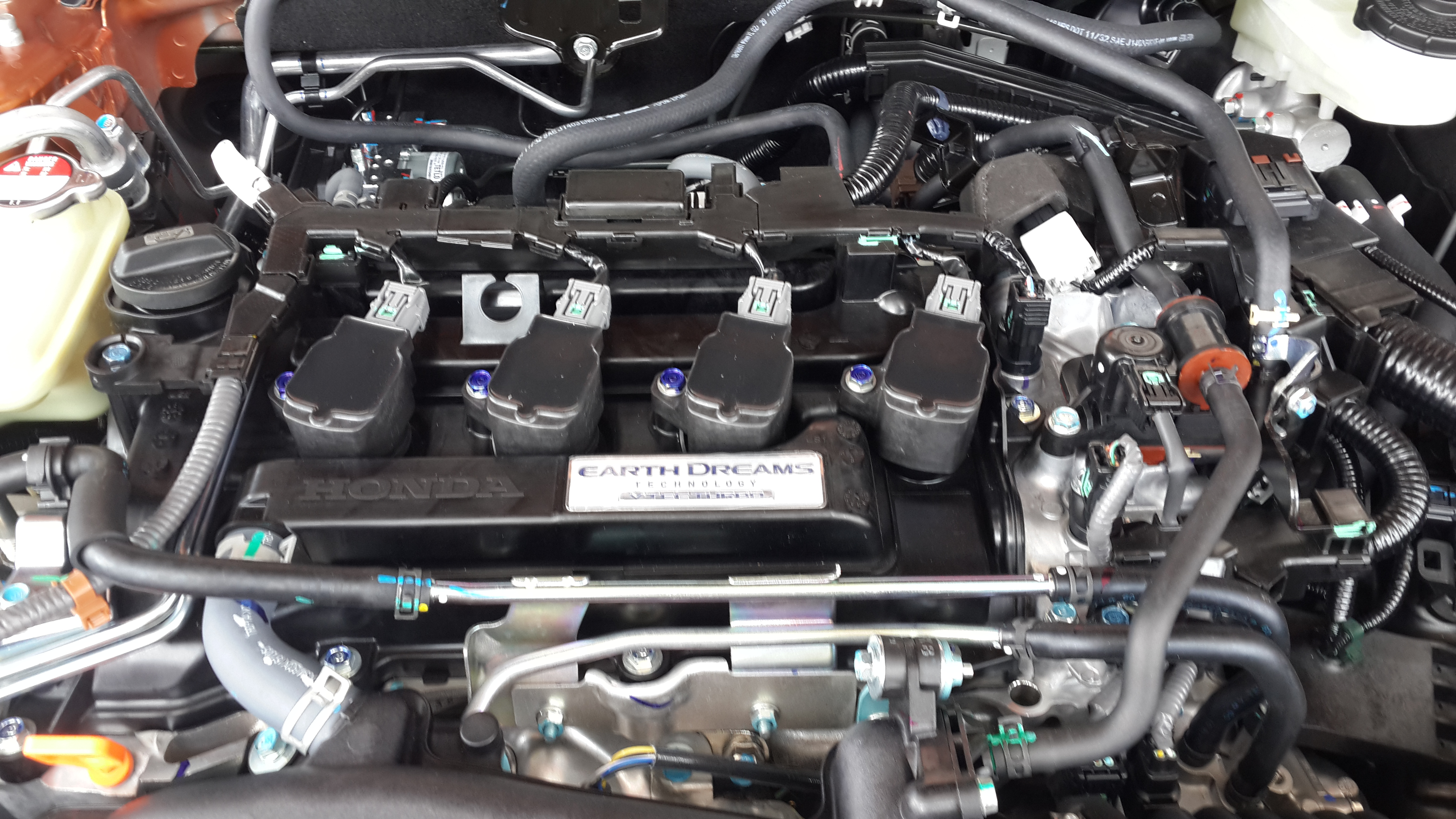
L15B7 VTC Engine

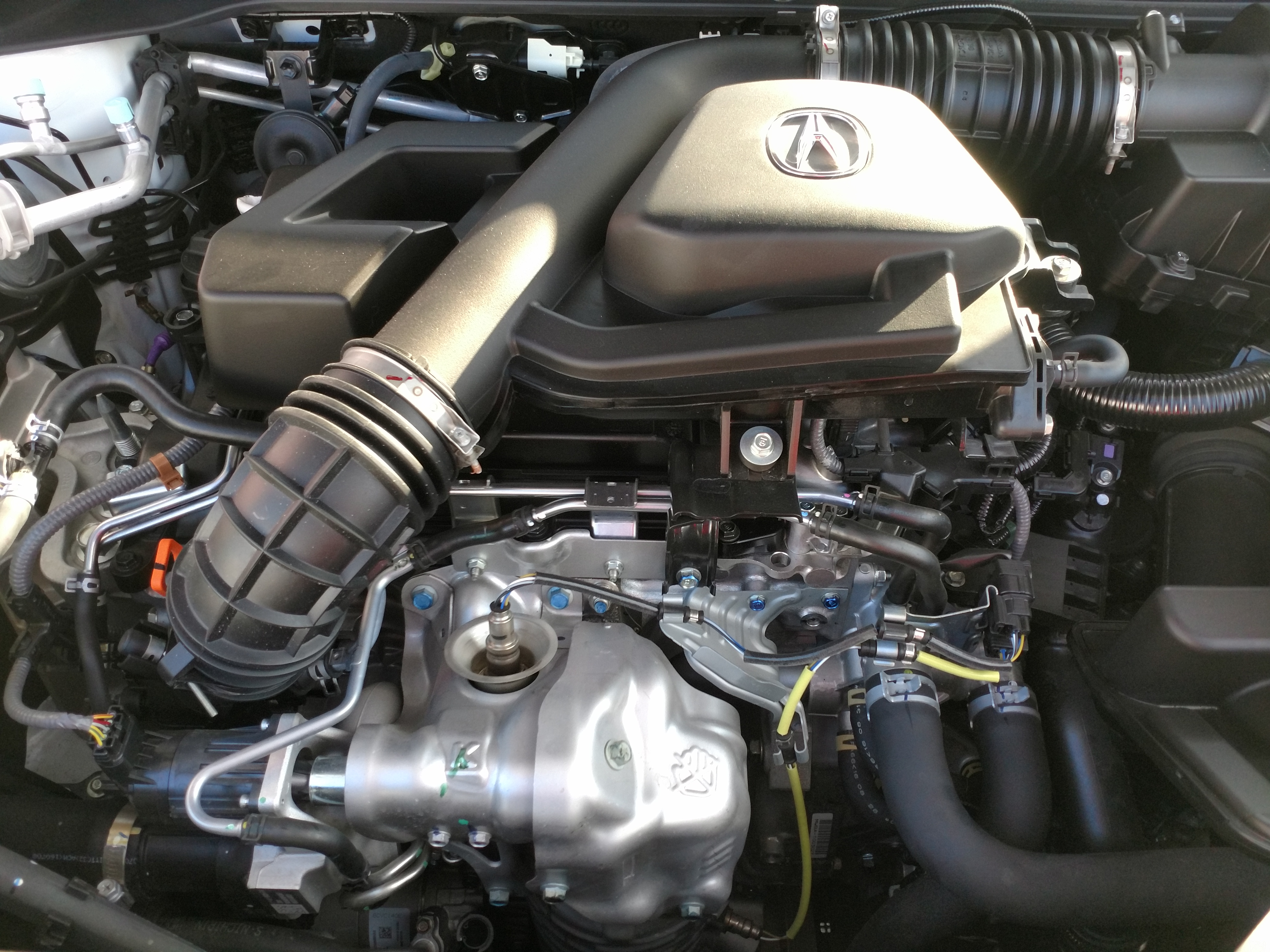
L15B9 VTC Engine

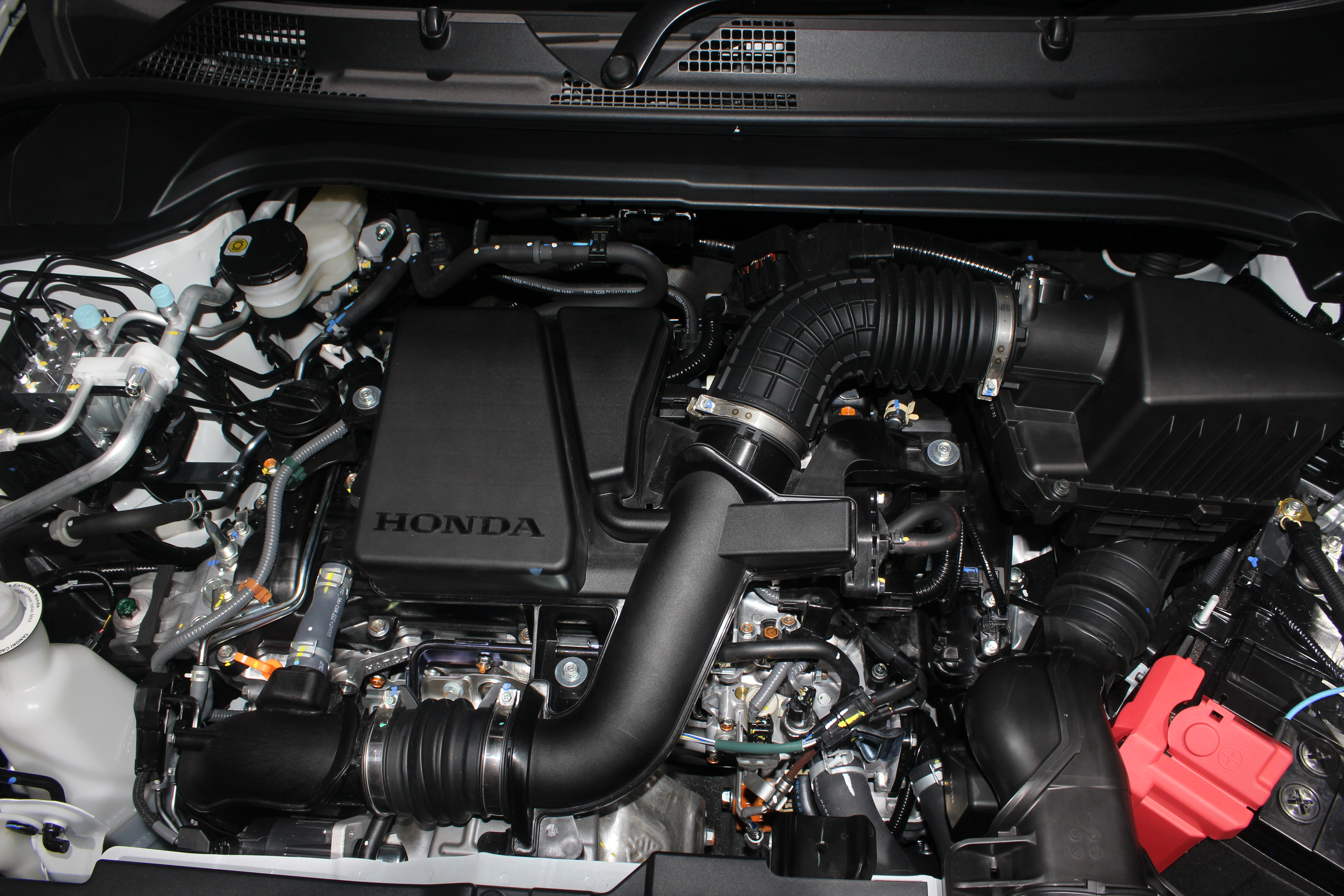
L15C1 VTEC Engine

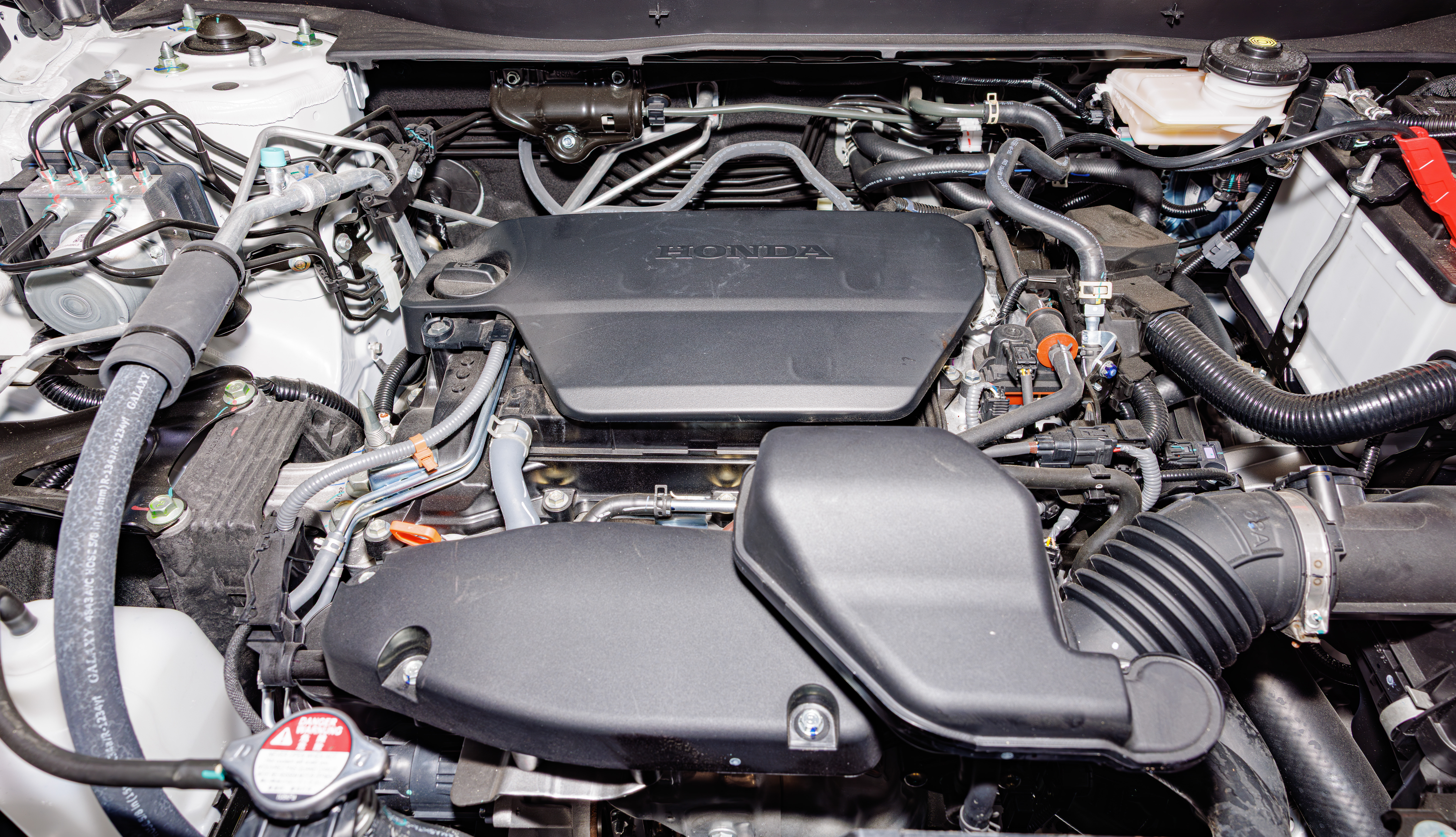
L15BE VTEC Engine

== L15Z ==
=== L15Z (i-VTEC) ===
Honda L15Z (i-VTEC)
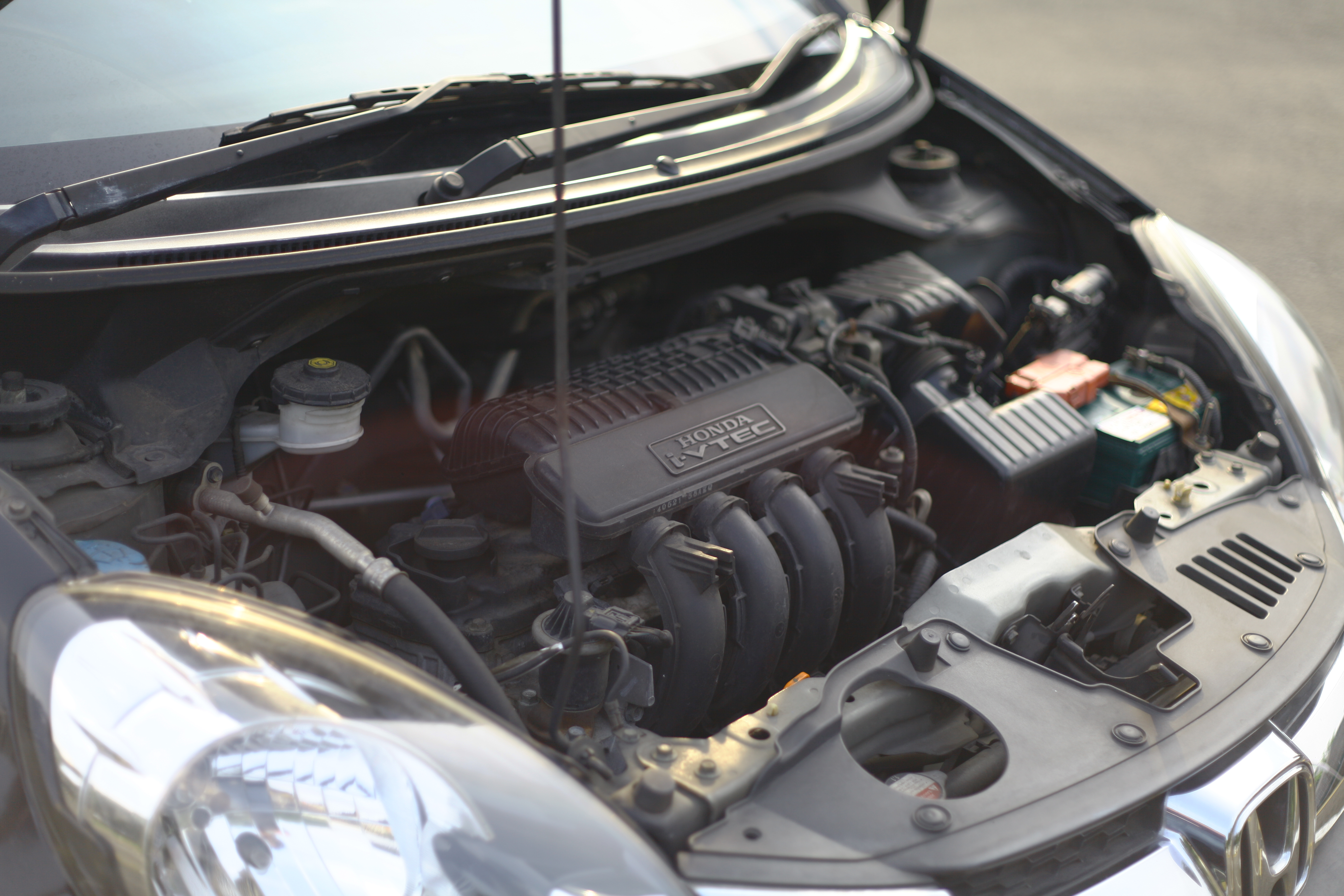

Overview
- Manufacturer: Honda Motor Co., Ltd.
- Production: 2014–present

Layout
- Configuration: I4
- Displacement: 1.5 L; 91.4 cu in (1,497 cc)
- Cylinder bore: 73 mm (2.874 in)
- Piston stroke: 89.4 mm (3.520 in)
- Valvetrain: SOHC
- Compression ratio: See table for specific application

Combustion
- Fuel system: Multi-point fuel injection
- Management: ECU
- Fuel type: Gasoline
- Cooling system: Water-cooled

Output
- Power output: See table for specific application
- Torque output: See table for specific application

Applications

Engine	Application	Compression	Power	Torque
L15Z1	2014–present Honda Mobilio (DD4)	10.3:1	118 hp (88 kW) 119 bhp at 6600 rpm	107 lb⋅ft (145 N⋅m) at 4600 rpm
L15Z1	2014–2020 Honda City (GM6)	10.3:1	118 hp (88 kW) 119 bhp at 6600 rpm	107 lb⋅ft (145 N⋅m) at 4600 rpm
L15Z1	2016–present Honda BR-V (DG1)	10.3:1	118 hp (88 kW) 119 bhp at 6600 rpm	107 lb⋅ft (145 N⋅m) at 4600 rpm
L15Z1 (FFV)	2014–present Honda Mobilio (DD4) (Thailand)	10.3:1	115 hp (86 kW) at 6000 rpm	108 lb⋅ft (146 N⋅m) at 4700 rpm
L15Z1 (FFV)	2014–2020 Honda City (GM6) (Thailand)	10.3:1	115 hp (86 kW) at 6000 rpm	108 lb⋅ft (146 N⋅m) at 4700 rpm
L15Z1 (FFV)	2016–present Honda BR-V (DG1) (Thailand)	10.3:1	115 hp (86 kW) at 6000 rpm	108 lb⋅ft (146 N⋅m) at 4700 rpm
L15Z2 (FFV)	2013–2019 Honda Jazz (GK5) (Thailand)	10.3:1	115 hp (86 kW) at 6000 rpm	108 lb⋅ft (146 N⋅m) at 4700 rpm
L15Z5	2013–2019 Honda Jazz (GK5)	10.3:1	118 hp (88 kW) at 6600 rpm	107 lb⋅ft (145 N⋅m) at 4800 rpm
L15Z6	2014–present Honda HR-V (RU1) (Indonesia)	10.3:1	118 hp (88 kW) at 6600 rpm	107 lb⋅ft (145 N⋅m) at 4600 rpm

Additional notes

- L15Z1 (only FFV version) and L15Z2 engine is flex fuel capable up to E85

=== L15Z (Earth Dreams i-VTEC) ===
Honda L15Z (Earth Dreams i-VTEC)
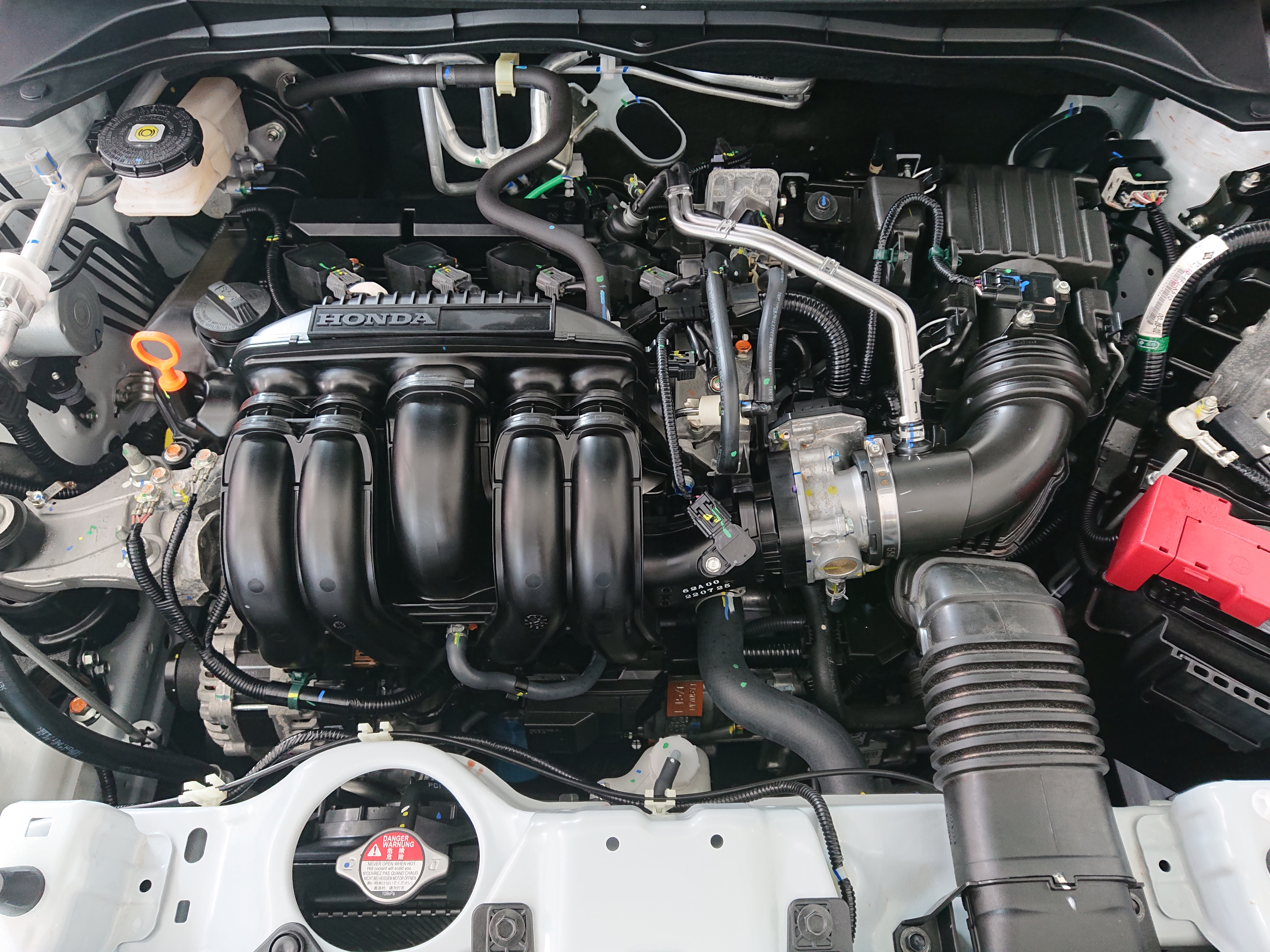

Overview
- Manufacturer: Honda Motor Co., Ltd.
- Production: 2020–present

Layout
- Configuration: I4
- Displacement: 1.5 L; 91.4 cu in (1,497 cc)
- Cylinder bore: 73 mm (2.874 in)
- Piston stroke: 89.4 mm (3.520 in)
- Valvetrain: DOHC
- Compression ratio: See table for specific application

Combustion
- Fuel system: Multi-point fuel injection
- Management: ECU
- Fuel type: Gasoline
- Cooling system: Water-cooled

Output
- Power output: See table for specific application
- Torque output: See table for specific application

Applications

Engine	Application	Compression	Power	Torque
L15Z	2021–present Honda Vezel (RV3/RV4) (Japan)	10.6:1	118 PS (87 kW; 116 hp) at 6600 rpm	142 N⋅m (105 lb⋅ft) at 4300 rpm
L15ZE	2020–present Honda City (GN2/GN5) (Malaysia)	10.6:1	121 PS (89 kW; 119 hp) at 6600 rpm	145 N⋅m (107 lb⋅ft) at 4300 rpm
L15ZF	2020–present Honda City (GN2/GN5)	10.6:1	121 PS (89 kW; 119 hp) at 6600 rpm	145 N⋅m (107 lb⋅ft) at 4300 rpm
L15ZF	2020–present Honda Jazz (GR9/GS1) (Taiwan Singapore and South Africa)	10.6:1	121 PS (89 kW; 119 hp) at 6600 rpm	145 N⋅m (107 lb⋅ft) at 4300 rpm
L15ZF	2021–present Honda BR-V (DG3)	10.6:1	121 PS (89 kW; 119 hp) at 6600 rpm	145 N⋅m (107 lb⋅ft) at 4300 rpm
L15ZF	2022–present Honda HR-V (RV3)	10.6:1	121 PS (89 kW; 119 hp) at 6600 rpm	145 N⋅m (107 lb⋅ft) at 4300 rpm
L15ZF	2022–present Honda WR-V (DG4) (Indonesia)	10.6:1	121 PS (89 kW; 119 hp) at 6600 rpm	145 N⋅m (107 lb⋅ft) at 4300 rpm
L15ZF	2023–present Honda Elevate (India)	10.6:1	121 PS (89 kW; 119 hp) at 6600 rpm	145 N⋅m (107 lb⋅ft) at 4300 rpm

== LD (L13-based Hybrid engine) ==
=== LDA (IMA) ===
Honda LDA (IMA)
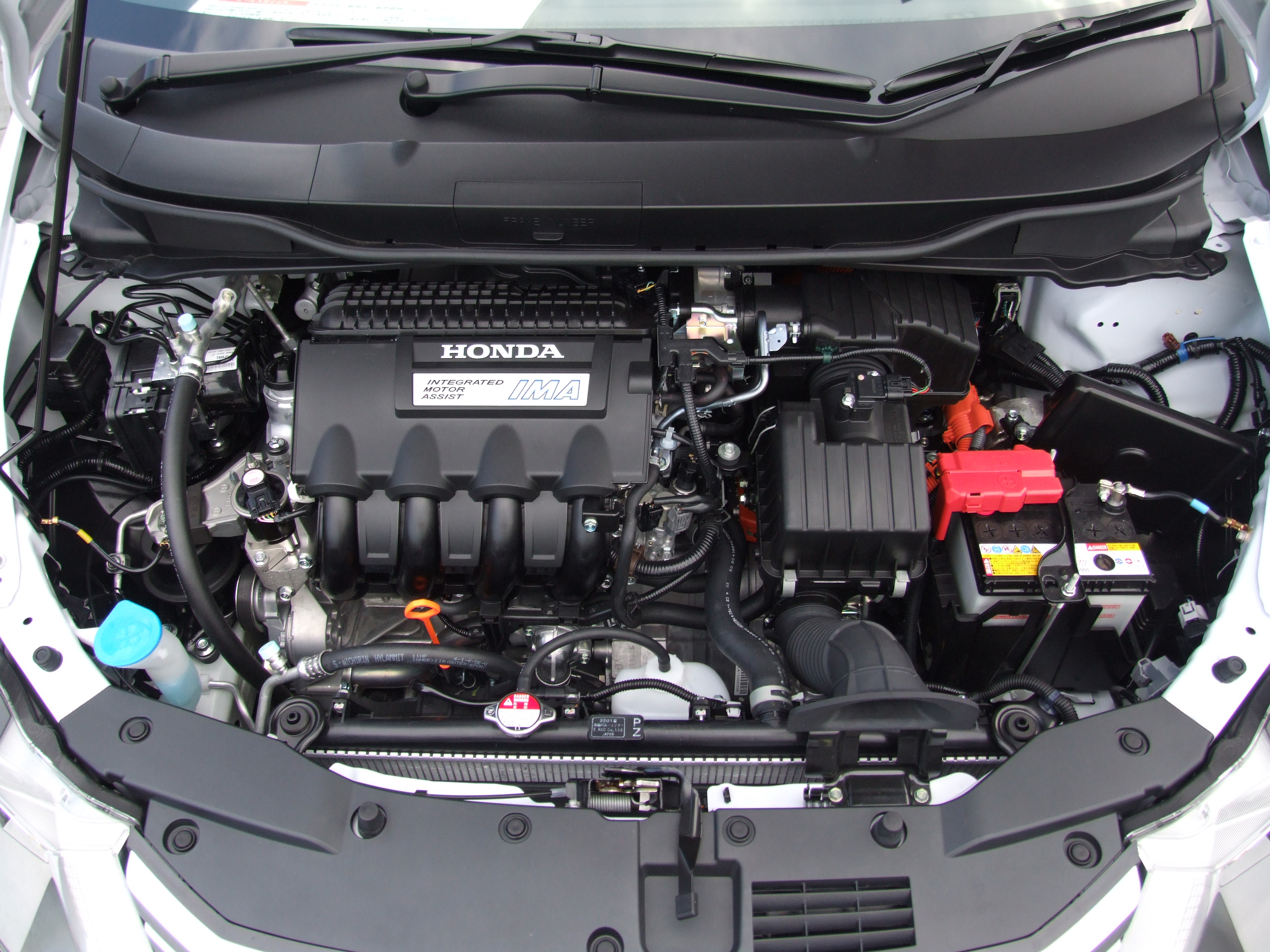

Overview
- Manufacturer: Honda Motor Co., Ltd.
- Production: 2001–2015

Layout
- Configuration: I4
- Displacement: 1.3 L; 81.7 cu in (1,339 cc)
- Cylinder bore: 73 mm (2.874 in)
- Piston stroke: 80 mm (3.150 in)
- Valvetrain: SOHC
- Compression ratio: See left for specific application.

Combustion
- Fuel system: Multi-point fuel injection
- Management: ECU
- Fuel type: Gasoline
- Cooling system: Water-cooled

Output
- Power output: See left for specific application.
- Torque output: See left for specific application.

Integrated Motor Assist (IMA) hybrid system, features Variable Cylinder Management (VCM)

Applications

Engine	Application	Compression	Valve System	Power (Engine)	Torque (Engine)	Power (Motor)	Torque (Motor)
LDA-MF3	2001–2005 Honda Civic Hybrid (ES9) (Japan)	10.8:1	VTEC	85 hp (63 kW) @ 5700 rpm	85 lb⋅ft (115 N⋅m) @ 3300 rpm	14 hp (10 kW) @ 4000 rpm	36 lb⋅ft (49 N⋅m) @ 1000 rpm
LDA-MF5	2006–2010 Honda Civic Hybrid (FD3) (Japan)	10.8:1	3-stage i-VTEC	93 hp (69 kW) @ 6000 rpm	89 lb⋅ft (121 N⋅m) @ 4500 rpm	20 hp (15 kW) @ 2000 rpm	76 lb⋅ft (103 N⋅m) @ 0-1160 rpm
LDA-MF6	2009–2014 Honda Insight (ZE2) (Japan)	10.8:1	i-VTEC	88 hp (66 kW) @ 5800 rpm	89 lb⋅ft (121 N⋅m) @ 4500 rpm	14 hp (10 kW) @ 1500 rpm	58 lb⋅ft (78 N⋅m) @ 1000 rpm
LDA-MF6	2010–2013 Honda Fit Hybrid (GP1) (Japan)	10.8:1	i-VTEC	88 hp (66 kW) @ 5800 rpm	89 lb⋅ft (121 N⋅m) @ 4500 rpm	14 hp (10 kW) @ 1500 rpm	58 lb⋅ft (78 N⋅m) @ 1000 rpm
LDA-MF6	2010–2015 Honda Fit Shuttle Hybrid (GP2) (Japan)	10.8:1	i-VTEC	88 hp (66 kW) @ 5800 rpm	89 lb⋅ft (121 N⋅m) @ 4500 rpm	14 hp (10 kW) @ 1500 rpm	58 lb⋅ft (78 N⋅m) @ 1000 rpm
LDA1	2001–2005 Honda Civic Hybrid (ES9)	10.8:1	VTEC	85 hp (63 kW) @ 5700 rpm	85 lb⋅ft (115 N⋅m) @ 3300 rpm	14 hp (10 kW) @ 4000 rpm	36 lb⋅ft (49 N⋅m) @ 1000 rpm
LDA2	2006–2010 Honda Civic Hybrid (FD3)	10.8:1	3-stage i-VTEC	93 hp (69 kW) @ 6000 rpm	89 lb⋅ft (121 N⋅m) @ 4500 rpm	20 hp (15 kW) @ 2000 rpm	76 lb⋅ft (103 N⋅m) @ 0-1160 rpm
LDA3	2009–2014 Honda Insight (ZE2)	10.8:1	i-VTEC	88 hp (66 kW) @ 5800 rpm	89 lb⋅ft (121 N⋅m) @ 4500 rpm	14 hp (10 kW) @ 1500 rpm	58 lb⋅ft (78 N⋅m) @ 1000 rpm
LDA3	2010–2013 Honda Fit Hybrid (GP1)	10.8:1	i-VTEC	88 hp (66 kW) @ 5800 rpm	89 lb⋅ft (121 N⋅m) @ 4500 rpm	14 hp (10 kW) @ 1500 rpm	58 lb⋅ft (78 N⋅m) @ 1000 rpm

Additional notes

- LDA-MF3 and LDA1 engine feature i-DSI ignition system
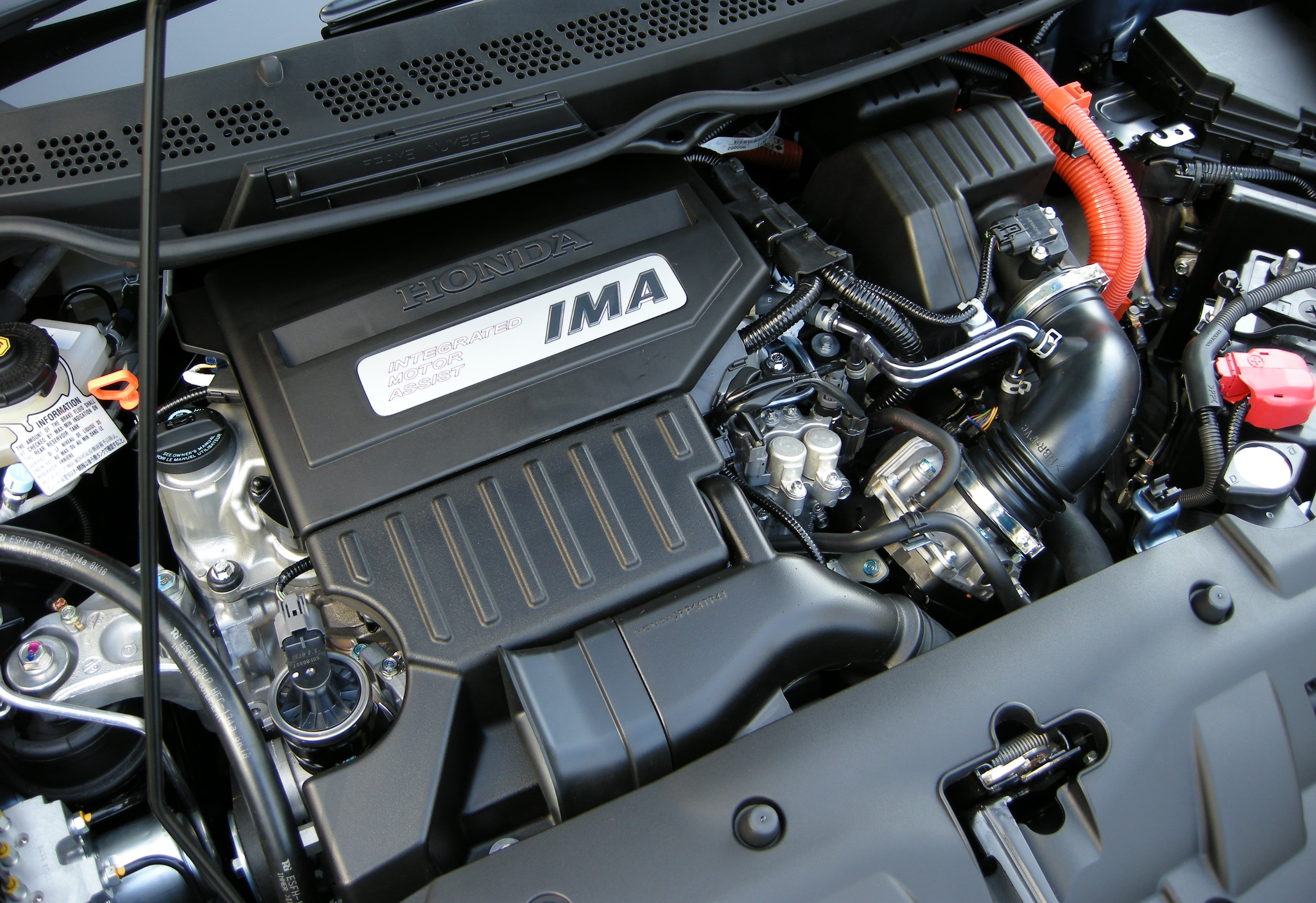
LDA-MF5 Engine

== LE (L15-based Hybrid engine) ==
=== LEA (IMA) ===
Honda LEA (IMA)
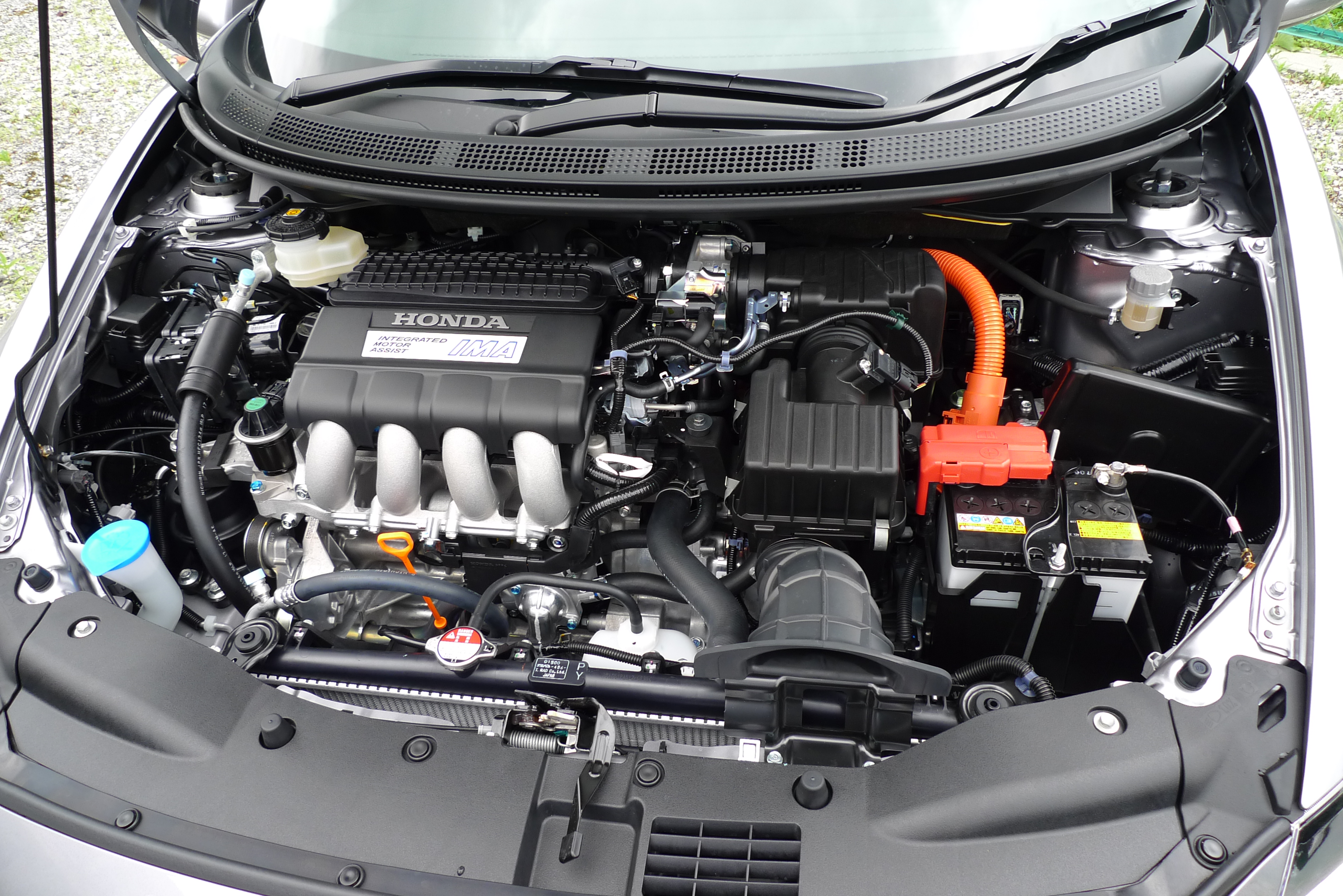

Overview
- Manufacturer: Honda Motor Co., Ltd.
- Production: 2010–2016

Layout
- Configuration: I4
- Displacement: 1.5 L; 91.4 cu in (1,497 cc)
- Cylinder bore: 73 mm (2.874 in)
- Piston stroke: 89.4 mm (3.520 in)
- Valvetrain: SOHC
- Compression ratio: See left for specific application.

Combustion
- Fuel system: Multi-point fuel injection
- Management: ECU
- Fuel type: Gasoline
- Cooling system: Water-cooled

Output
- Power output: See left for specific application.
- Torque output: See left for specific application.

i-VTEC with Integrated Motor Assist (IMA) hybrid system

Applications

Engine	Application	Compression	Power (Engine)	Torque (Engine)	Power (Motor)	Torque (Motor)
LEA-MF6	2010–2014 Honda Insight Exclusive (ZE3) (Japan)	10.4:1	111 hp (83 kW) @ 6000 rpm	105 lb⋅ft (142 N⋅m) @ 4800 rpm	14 hp (10 kW) @ 1500 rpm	58 lb⋅ft (78 N⋅m) @ 1000 rpm
LEA-MF6	2011–2016 Honda Freed Spike (GP3) (Japan)	10.4:1	111 hp (83 kW) @ 6000 rpm	105 lb⋅ft (142 N⋅m) @ 4800 rpm	14 hp (10 kW) @ 1500 rpm	58 lb⋅ft (78 N⋅m) @ 1000 rpm
LEA-MF6	2010–2013 Honda Fit Hybrid RS (GP4) (Japan)	10.4:1	111 hp (83 kW) @ 6000 rpm	105 lb⋅ft (142 N⋅m) @ 4800 rpm	14 hp (10 kW) @ 1500 rpm	58 lb⋅ft (78 N⋅m) @ 1000 rpm
LEA-MF6	2010–2015 Honda CR-Z (ZF1) (Japan)	10.4:1	111 hp (83 kW) @ 6000 rpm	105 lb⋅ft (142 N⋅m) @ 4800 rpm	14 hp (10 kW) @ 1500 rpm	58 lb⋅ft (78 N⋅m) @ 1000 rpm
LEA1	2010–2011 Honda CR-Z (ZF1)	10.4:1	111 hp (83 kW) @ 6000 rpm	105 lb⋅ft (142 N⋅m) @ 4800 rpm	14 hp (10 kW) @ 1500 rpm	58 lb⋅ft (78 N⋅m) @ 1000 rpm
LEA1	2013–2016 Honda CR-Z (ZF2)	10.4:1	111 hp (83 kW) @ 6000 rpm	105 lb⋅ft (142 N⋅m) @ 4800 rpm	23 hp (17 kW) @ 1500 rpm	78 lb⋅ft (106 N⋅m) @ 1000 rpm
LEA2	2012–2015 Honda Civic Hybrid (FB4)	10.8:1	110 hp (82 kW) @ 5500 rpm	127 lb⋅ft (172 N⋅m) @ 3500 rpm	23 hp (17 kW) @ 1546-3000 rpm	78 lb⋅ft (106 N⋅m) @ 500-1546 rpm

=== LEB (i-DCD) ===
Honda LEB (i-DCD)

Overview
- Manufacturer: Honda Motor Co., Ltd.
- Production: 2013–2024

Layout
- Configuration: I4
- Displacement: 1.5 L; 91.4 cu in (1,497 cc)
- Cylinder bore: 73 mm (2.874 in)
- Piston stroke: 89.4 mm (3.520 in)
- Valvetrain: DOHC
- Compression ratio: See table for specific application

Combustion
- Fuel system: Direct fuel injection
- Management: ECU
- Fuel type: Gasoline
- Cooling system: Water-cooled

Output
- Power output: See table for specific application
- Torque output: See table for specific application

Earth Dreams i-VTEC with Sport Hybrid i-DCD (intelligent Dual-Clutch Drive) system, operates in Atkinson-cycle

Applications

Engine	Application	Compression	Power (Engine)	Torque (Engine)	Power (Motor)	Torque (Motor)
LEB-H1	2013–2019 Honda Fit Hybrid (GP5/GP6) (Japan)	13.5:1	110 PS (81 kW; 108 hp) at 6000 rpm	134 N⋅m (99 lb⋅ft) at 5000 rpm	29.5 PS (22 kW; 29 hp) at 1313–2000 rpm	160 N⋅m (118 lb⋅ft) at 0–1313 rpm
LEB-H1	2014–2020 Honda Grace (GM4/GM5) (Japan)	13.5:1	110 PS (81 kW; 108 hp) at 6000 rpm	134 N⋅m (99 lb⋅ft) at 5000 rpm	29.5 PS (22 kW; 29 hp) at 1313–2000 rpm	160 N⋅m (118 lb⋅ft) at 0–1313 rpm
LEB-H1	2016–2024 Honda Freed Hybrid (GB7/GB8) (Japan)	13.5:1	110 PS (81 kW; 108 hp) at 6000 rpm	134 N⋅m (99 lb⋅ft) at 5000 rpm	29.5 PS (22 kW; 29 hp) at 1313–2000 rpm	160 N⋅m (118 lb⋅ft) at 0–1313 rpm
LEB-H1	2017–2022 Honda Shuttle Hybrid (GP7/GP8) (Japan)	13.5:1	110 PS (81 kW; 108 hp) at 6000 rpm	134 N⋅m (99 lb⋅ft) at 5000 rpm	29.5 PS (22 kW; 29 hp) at 1313–2000 rpm	160 N⋅m (118 lb⋅ft) at 0–1313 rpm
LEB-H1	2013–2021 Honda Vezel Hybrid (RU3/RU4) (Japan)	11.5:1	132 PS (97 kW; 130 hp) at 6600 rpm	156 N⋅m (115 lb⋅ft) at 4600 rpm	29.5 PS (22 kW; 29 hp) at 1313–2000 rpm	160 N⋅m (118 lb⋅ft) at 0–1313 rpm
LEB-H1	2015–2020 Honda Jade (FR4) (Japan)	11.5:1	131 PS (96 kW; 129 hp) at 6600 rpm	155 N⋅m (114 lb⋅ft) at 4600 rpm	29.5 PS (22 kW; 29 hp) at 1313–2000 rpm	160 N⋅m (118 lb⋅ft) at 0–1313 rpm
LEB1	2014–2020 Honda Jazz Hybrid (GP5) (Malaysia)	13.5:1	110 PS (81 kW; 108 hp) at 6000 rpm	134 N⋅m (99 lb⋅ft) at 5000 rpm	29.5 PS (22 kW; 29 hp) at 1313–2000 rpm	160 N⋅m (118 lb⋅ft) at 0–1313 rpm
LEB1	2014–2020 Honda City Hybrid (GM7) (Malaysia)	13.5:1	110 PS (81 kW; 108 hp) at 6000 rpm	134 N⋅m (99 lb⋅ft) at 5000 rpm	29.5 PS (22 kW; 29 hp) at 1313–2000 rpm	160 N⋅m (118 lb⋅ft) at 0–1313 rpm
LEB1	2014–2021 Honda HR-V Hybrid (RU3/RU4) (Malaysia)	11.5:1	132 PS (97 kW; 130 hp) at 6600 rpm	156 N⋅m (115 lb⋅ft) at 4600 rpm	29.5 PS (22 kW; 29 hp) at 1313–2000 rpm	160 N⋅m (118 lb⋅ft) at 0–1313 rpm

=== LEB & LEC (i-MMD) ===
Honda LEB & LEC (i-MMD)
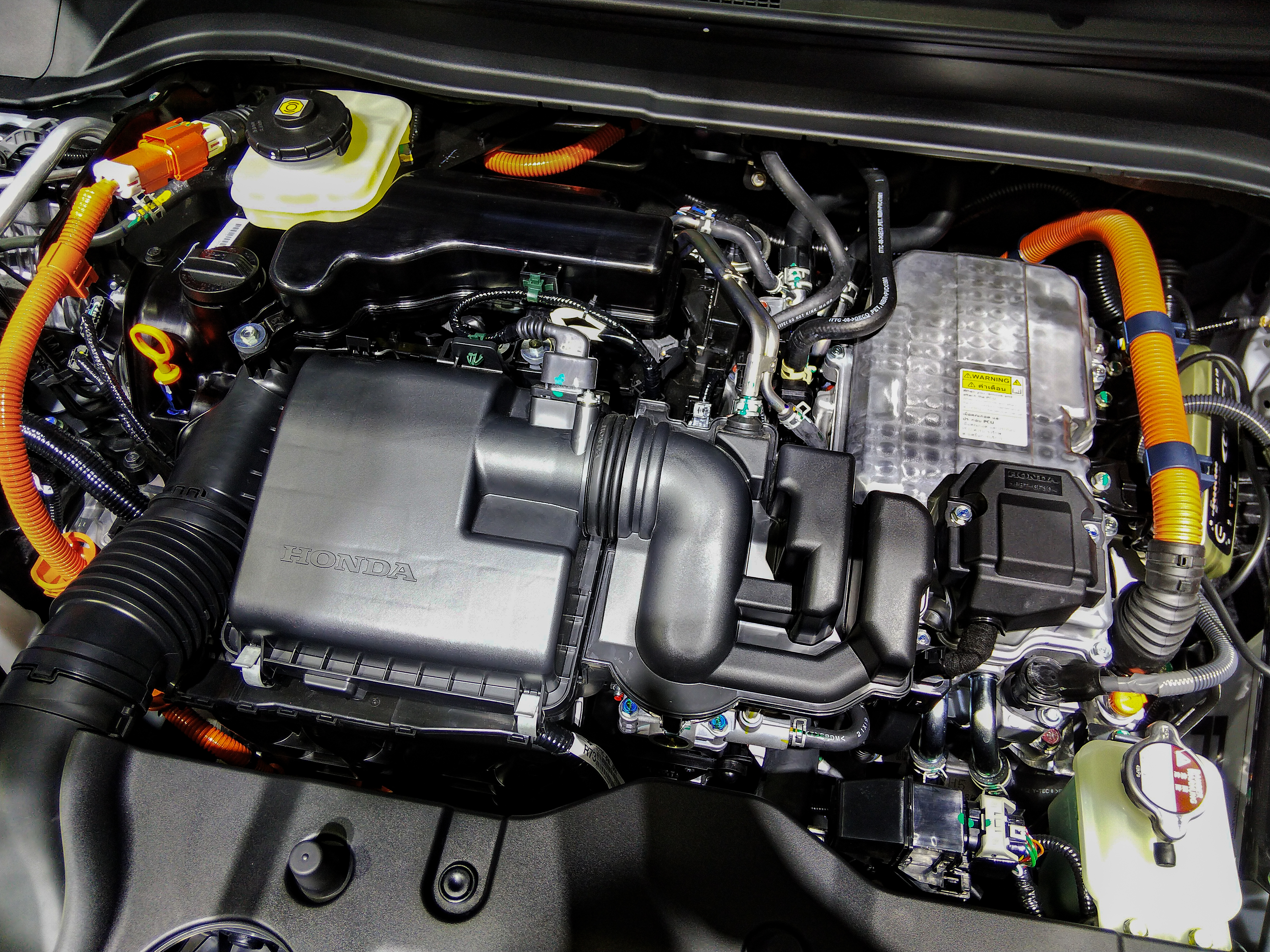

Overview
- Manufacturer: Honda Motor Co., Ltd.
- Production: 2017–present

Layout
- Configuration: I4
- Displacement: 1.5 L; 91.4 cu in (1,497 cc)
- Cylinder bore: 73 mm (2.874 in)
- Piston stroke: 89.4 mm (3.520 in)
- Valvetrain: DOHC
- Compression ratio: See left for specific application.

Combustion
- Fuel system: Multi-point fuel injection
- Management: ECU
- Fuel type: Gasoline
- Cooling system: Water-cooled

Output
- Power output: See left for specific application.
- Torque output: See left for specific application.

Earth Dreams i-VTEC with Sport Hybrid “i-MMD” (Intelligent Multi Mode Drive) system, operates in Atkinson-cycle

Applications

Engine	Application	Compression	Power (Engine)	Torque (Engine)	Power (Motor)	Torque (Motor)
LEB-H4	2018–2022 Honda Insight (ZE4) (Japan)	13.5:1	109 hp (81 kW) @ 6000 rpm	99 lb⋅ft (134 N⋅m) @ 5000 rpm	131 hp (98 kW) @ 4000-8000 rpm	197 lb⋅ft (267 N⋅m) @ 0-3000 rpm
LEB-H4	2018–2021 Honda Clarity PHEV (ZC5) (Japan)	13.5:1	105 hp (78 kW) @ 5500 rpm	99 lb⋅ft (134 N⋅m) @ 5000 rpm	184 hp (137 kW) @ 5000-6000 rpm	232 lb⋅ft (315 N⋅m) @ 0-2000 rpm
LEB-H5	2020–present Honda Fit e:HEV (GR3/GR4/GR6/GR8) (Japan)	13.5:1	106 hp (79 kW) @ 6000-6400 rpm	94 lb⋅ft (127 N⋅m) @ 4500-5000 rpm	123 hp (92 kW) @ 3500-8000 rpm	187 lb⋅ft (253 N⋅m) @ 0-3000 rpm
LEB3	2017–2021 Honda Clarity PHEV (ZC5)	13.5:1	105 hp (78 kW) @ 5500 rpm	99 lb⋅ft (134 N⋅m) @ 5000 rpm	184 hp (137 kW) @ 5000-6000 rpm	232 lb⋅ft (315 N⋅m) @ 0-2000 rpm
LEB6	2018–2022 Honda Insight (ZE4)	13.5:1	109 hp (81 kW) @ 6000 rpm	99 lb⋅ft (134 N⋅m) @ 5000 rpm	131 hp (98 kW) @ 4000-8000 rpm	197 lb⋅ft (267 N⋅m) @ 0-3000 rpm
LEB8	2020–present Honda City e:HEV (GN3/GN6)	13.5:1	98 hp (73 kW) @ 5600-6400 rpm	94 lb⋅ft (127 N⋅m) @ 4500-5000 rpm	109 hp (81 kW) @ 3500-8000 rpm	187 lb⋅ft (253 N⋅m) @ 0-3000 rpm
LEB8	2020–present Honda Jazz e:HEV (GR3/GR6)	13.5:1	98 hp (73 kW) @ 5600-6400 rpm	97 lb⋅ft (131 N⋅m) @ 4500-5000 rpm	109 hp (81 kW) @ 3500-8000 rpm	187 lb⋅ft (253 N⋅m) @ 0-3000 rpm
LEC-H5	2021–present Honda Vezel e:HEV (RV5/RV6) (Japan)	13.5:1	106 hp (79 kW) @ 6000-6400 rpm	94 lb⋅ft (127 N⋅m) @ 4500-5000 rpm	131 hp (98 kW) @ 4000-8000 rpm	187 lb⋅ft (253 N⋅m) @ 0-3500 rpm
LEC6	2021–present Honda HR-V e:HEV (RV5)	13.5:1	106 hp (79 kW) @ 6000-6400 rpm	94 lb⋅ft (127 N⋅m) @ 4500-5000 rpm	131 hp (98 kW) @ 4000-8000 rpm	187 lb⋅ft (253 N⋅m) @ 0-3500 rpm
