= Honda Mobilio =

Automobile manufactured by Honda

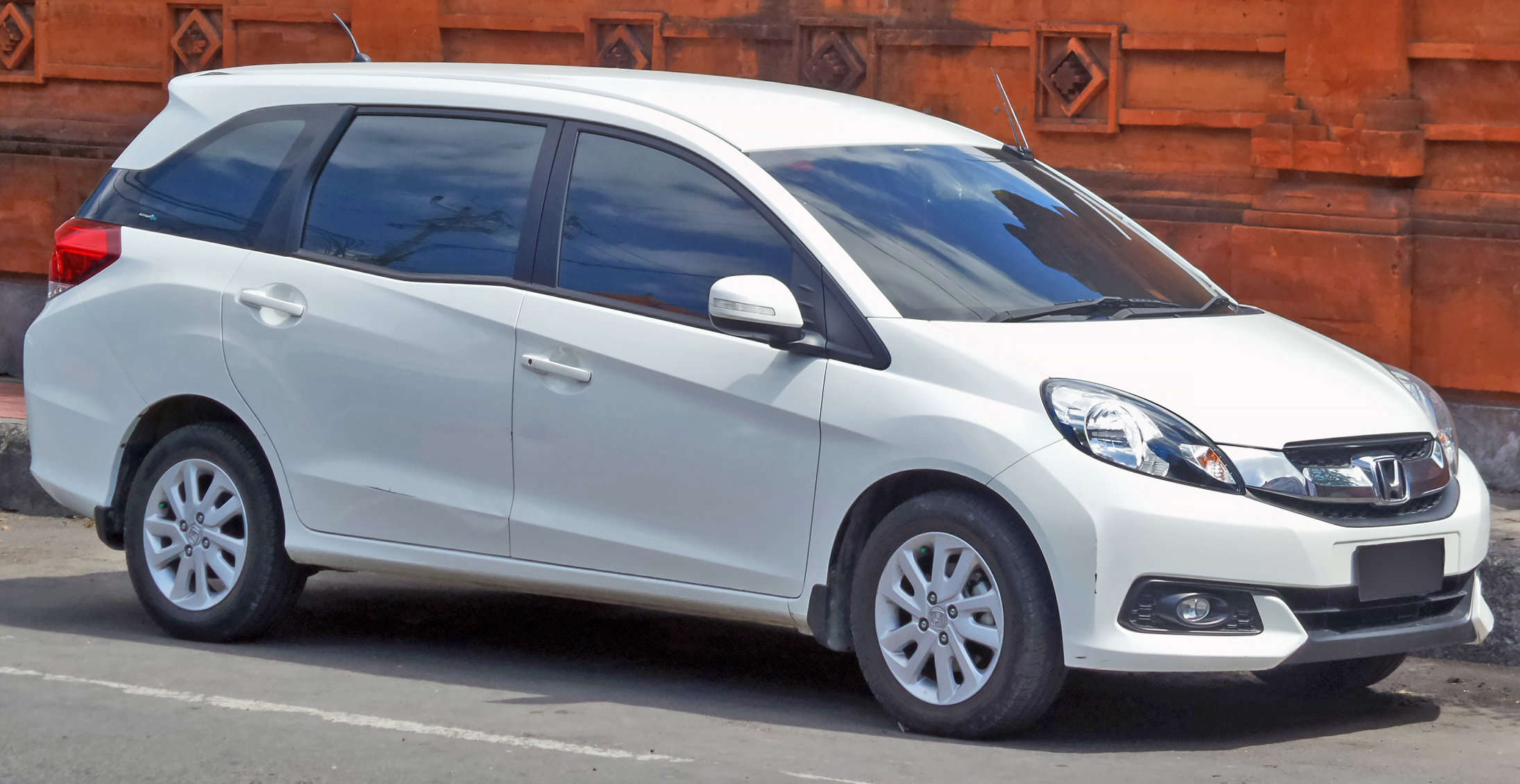
- 2014 Honda Mobilio E (DD4, Indonesia)

Overview
- Manufacturer: Honda
- Production: December 2001 – May 2008 (GB1/2); January 2014 – June 2024 (DD4/5)

Body and chassis
- Class: Mini MPV

Chronology
- Successor: Honda Freed (Japan, GB1/2); Honda BR-V (DD4/5)

The Honda Mobilio (Japanese: ホンダ・モビリオ, Hepburn: Honda Mobirio) is a seven-seat mini MPV produced by the Japanese automaker Honda. The first-generation Mobilio that was produced from 2001 to 2008 and sold exclusively in Japan. It was the second model in Honda's "Small Max" series and also took Honda's Global Small Platform and their i-DSI engine. In May 2008, the Freed was introduced, replacing the first-generation model. The second-generation Mobilio, which is based on the Brio, was introduced in September 2013 and went on sale in January 2014 for several emerging markets.

== First generation (GB1/2; 2001) ==
First generation
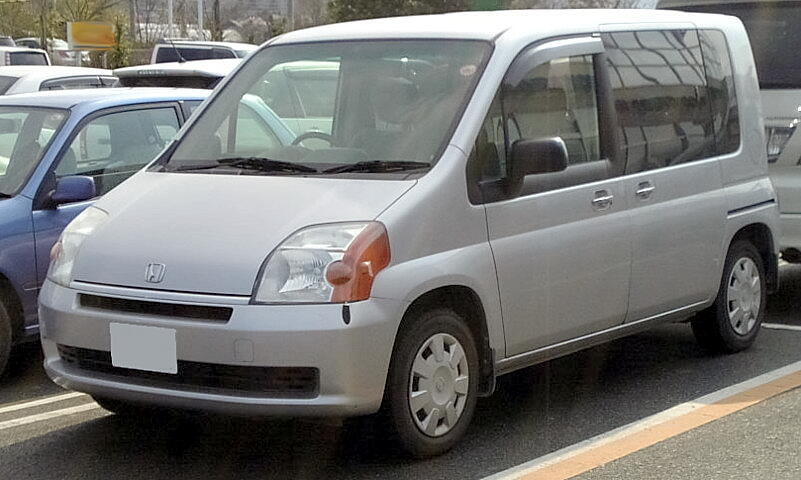
- 2001–2004 Mobilio (pre-facelift, Japan)

Overview
- Model code: GB1/2
- Production: December 2001 – May 2008
- Assembly: Japan: Suzuka, Mie

Body and chassis
- Body style: 5-door minivan
- Layout: Front-engine, front-wheel-drive; Front-engine, four-wheel-drive
- Platform: Honda Global Small Platform
- Related: Honda Fit (first generation)

Powertrain
- Engine: Petrol: 1.5 L L15A2 i-DSI I4; 1.5 L L15A1 VTEC I4
- Power output: 66 kW (89 hp; 90 PS) (L15A2 i-DSI); 81 kW (109 hp; 110 PS) (L15A1 VTEC)
- Transmission: CVT

Dimensions
- Wheelbase: 2,740 mm (107.9 in)
- Length: 4,055–4,070 mm (159.6–160.2 in)
- Width: 1,685–1,690 mm (66.3–66.5 in)
- Height: 1,705 mm (67.1 in) (FWD); 1,725 mm (67.9 in) (4WD); 1,730 mm (68.1 in) (Mobilio Spike)
- Curb weight: 1,270 kg (2,800 lb)

Chronology
- Predecessor: Honda Capa (for Mobilio); Honda S-MX (for Mobilio Spike)
- Successor: Honda Freed

The first-generation Mobilio was released on 21 December 2001. It is a 1.5-litre compact MPV that was designed with recreational activities in mind. The Mobilio, according to Honda, attained the highest fuel rating in the 7-passenger vehicle class, at 17.2 km/L (49 mpg_{‑imp}; 40 mpg_{‑US}). It was discontinued in May 2008 following the release of the Freed.

The Mobilio featured a spacious cargo area that was 1.86 m (6.09 ft) deep and 1.10 m (3.6 ft) tall and could be configured in 5 modes; utility mode, long mode, twin mode, refresh mode and adjustment mode. Along with the flexible cargo configurations, there are two sliding doors, one on each side. Interior tailgate storage hooks can hold about 5.0 kg (11 lb).

The Mobilio incorporates Honda's G-CON (G-force Control) technology, for enhanced crash safety. The vehicle body is designed to offer protection to occupants in a 55 km/h full-frontal collision, a 64 km/h front offset collision, 55 km/h side collision and a 50 km/h rear collision. Honda has implemented its own vehicle-to-vehicle collision testing program: 50% frontal offset collision with a 2-ton class vehicle while both vehicles traveling at 50 km/h, to help improve safety in real-world collisions. In order to enhance recyclability, almost all interior injection-molded parts are made of olefin resin. Together with other measures, it results in an overall vehicle recyclability of over 90%.

The 1.5 L VTEC engine is designed for both power and fuel economy. The Japanese Ministry of Transport recognized the Mobilio as an "excellent low emissions" vehicle. Also featured in the Mobilio is the Honda Multimatic S (CVT). It is Honda's new generation of CVT with 7-speed mode that offers three driving modes: CVT, 7-speed automatic shift mode and 7-speed manual shift mode. Four-wheel drive is also available.

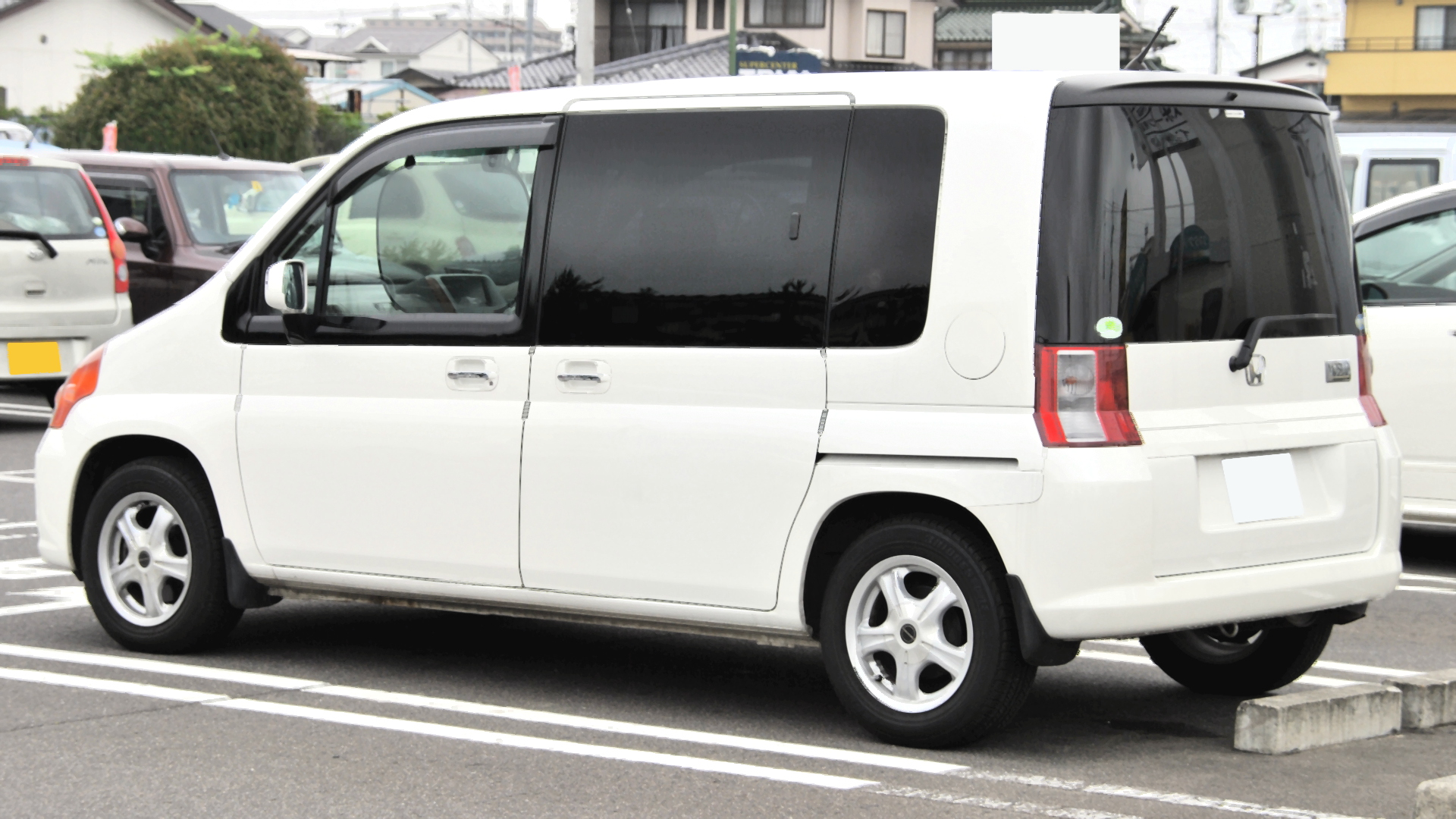
2001–2004 Mobilio (pre-facelift, Japan)

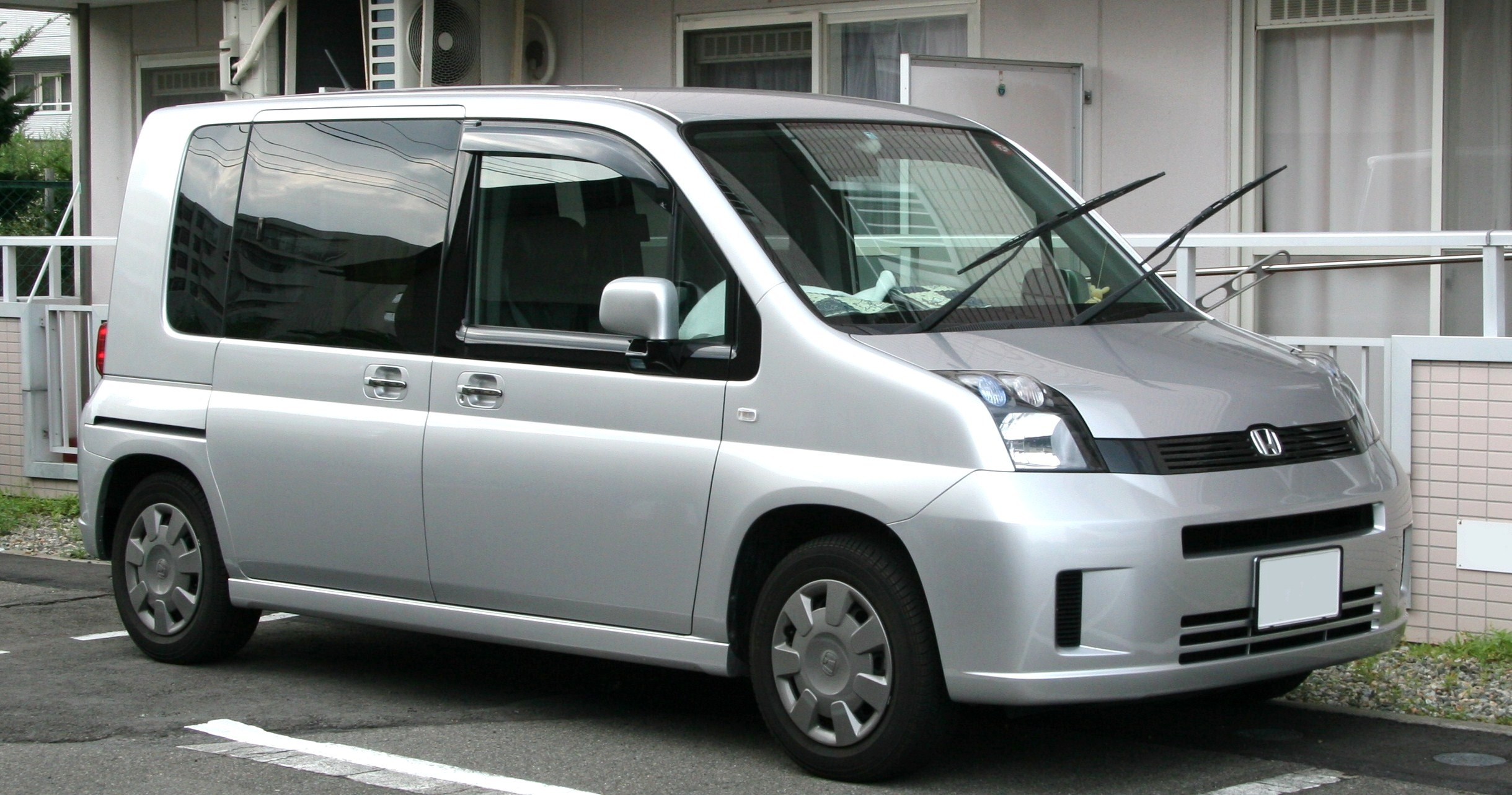
2004–2008 Mobilio (facelift, Japan)

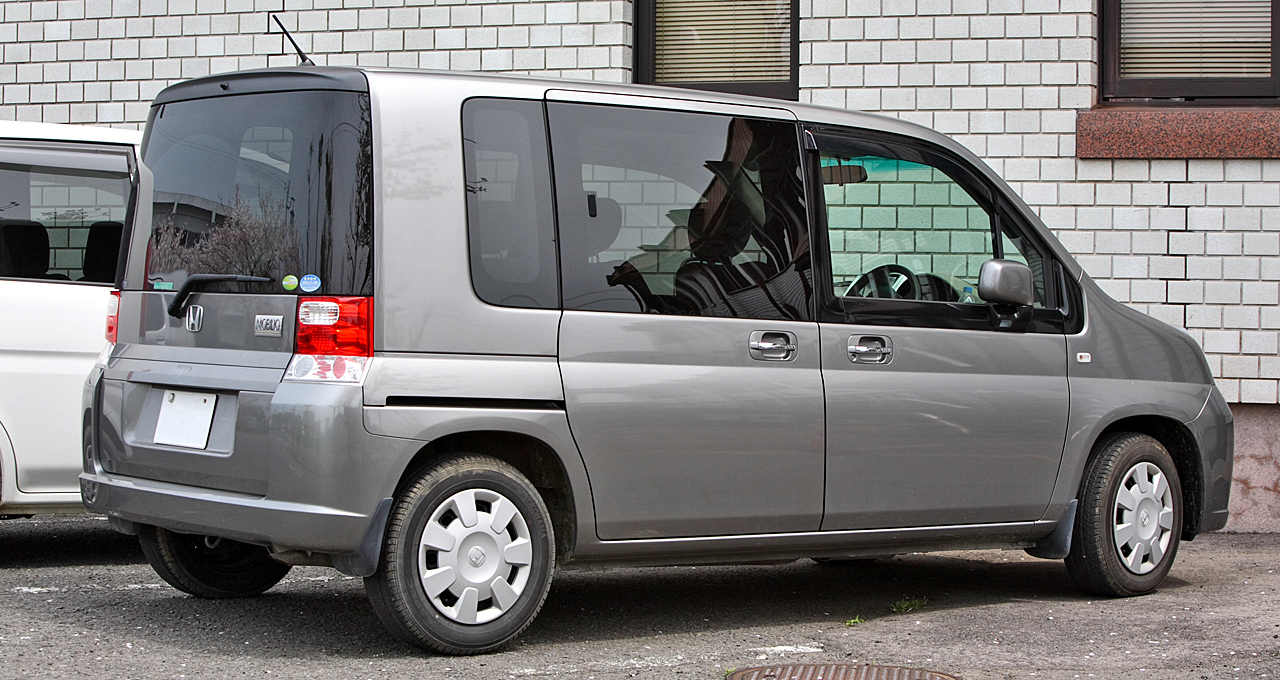
2004–2008 Mobilio (facelift, Japan)

=== Mobilio Spike (5 seater) ===
The Mobilio Spike was released in Japan on 19 September 2002. Differences from the regular 7 seater Mobilio include the C-pillar being twice as wide and an overall boxier design. An excellent Mini Van, with the rear seats down it has a flat floor. It received a facelift in 2005.

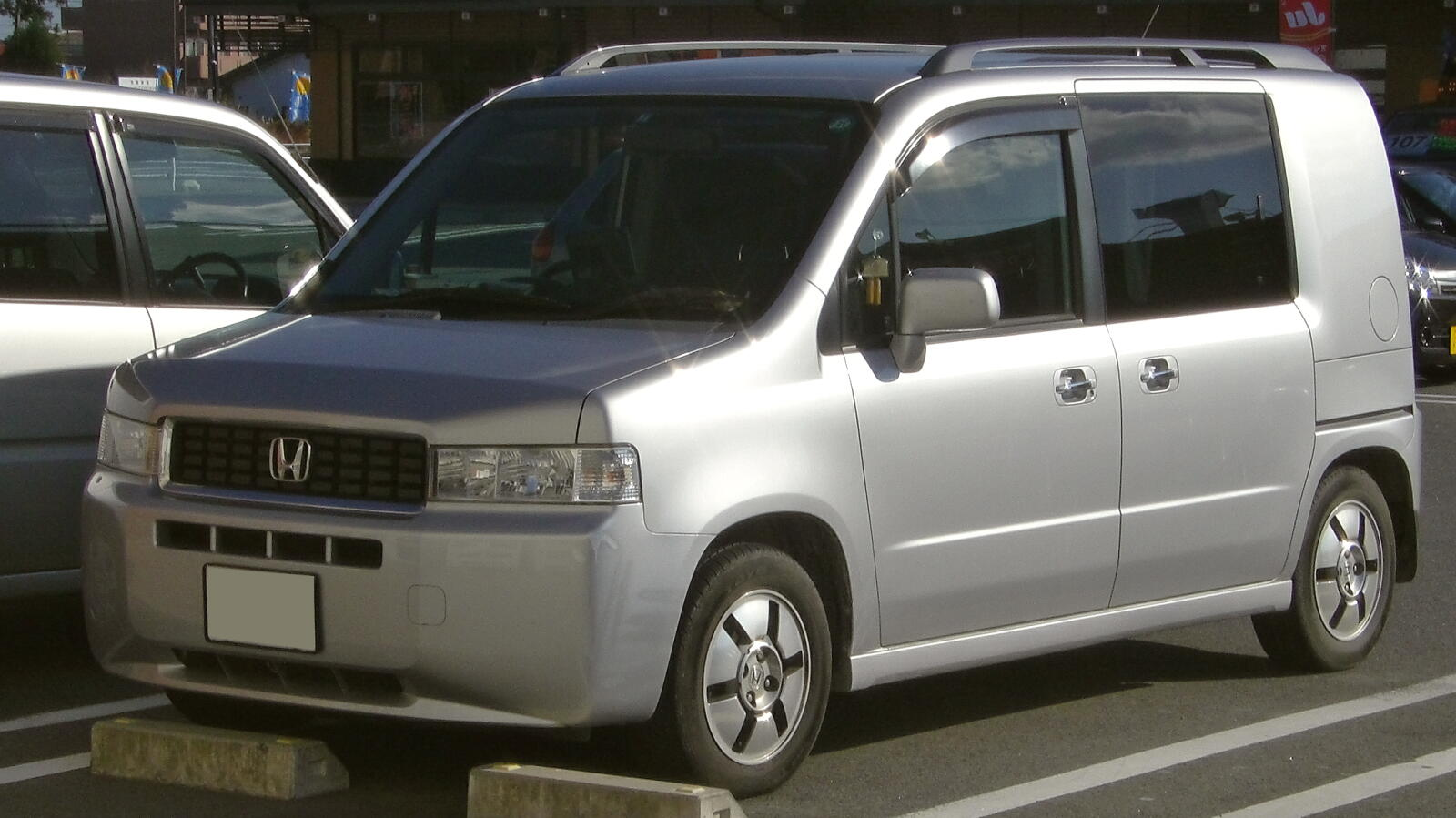
2002 Mobilio Spike (pre-facelift)

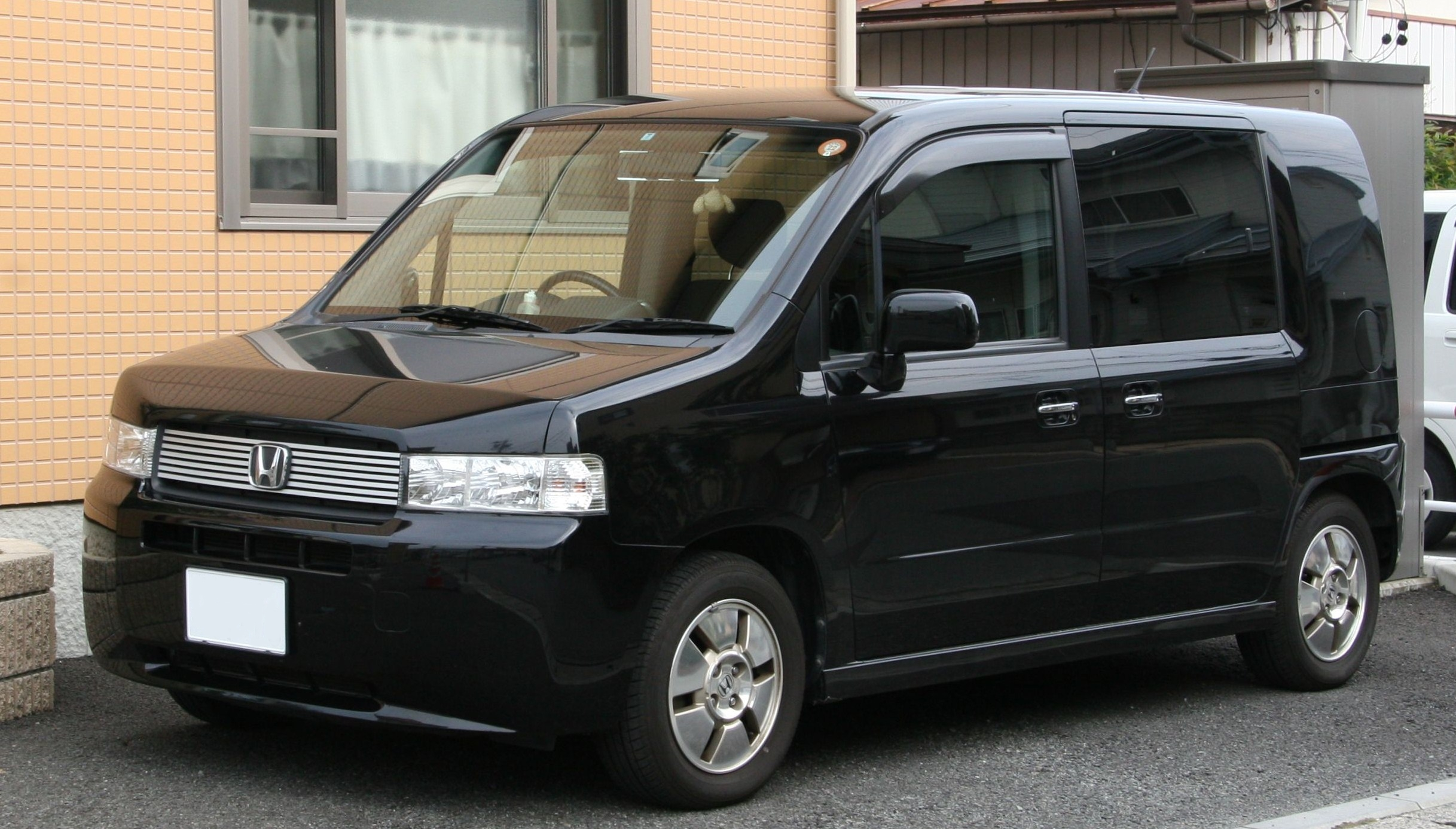
2004–2005 Mobilio Spike (pre-facelift)

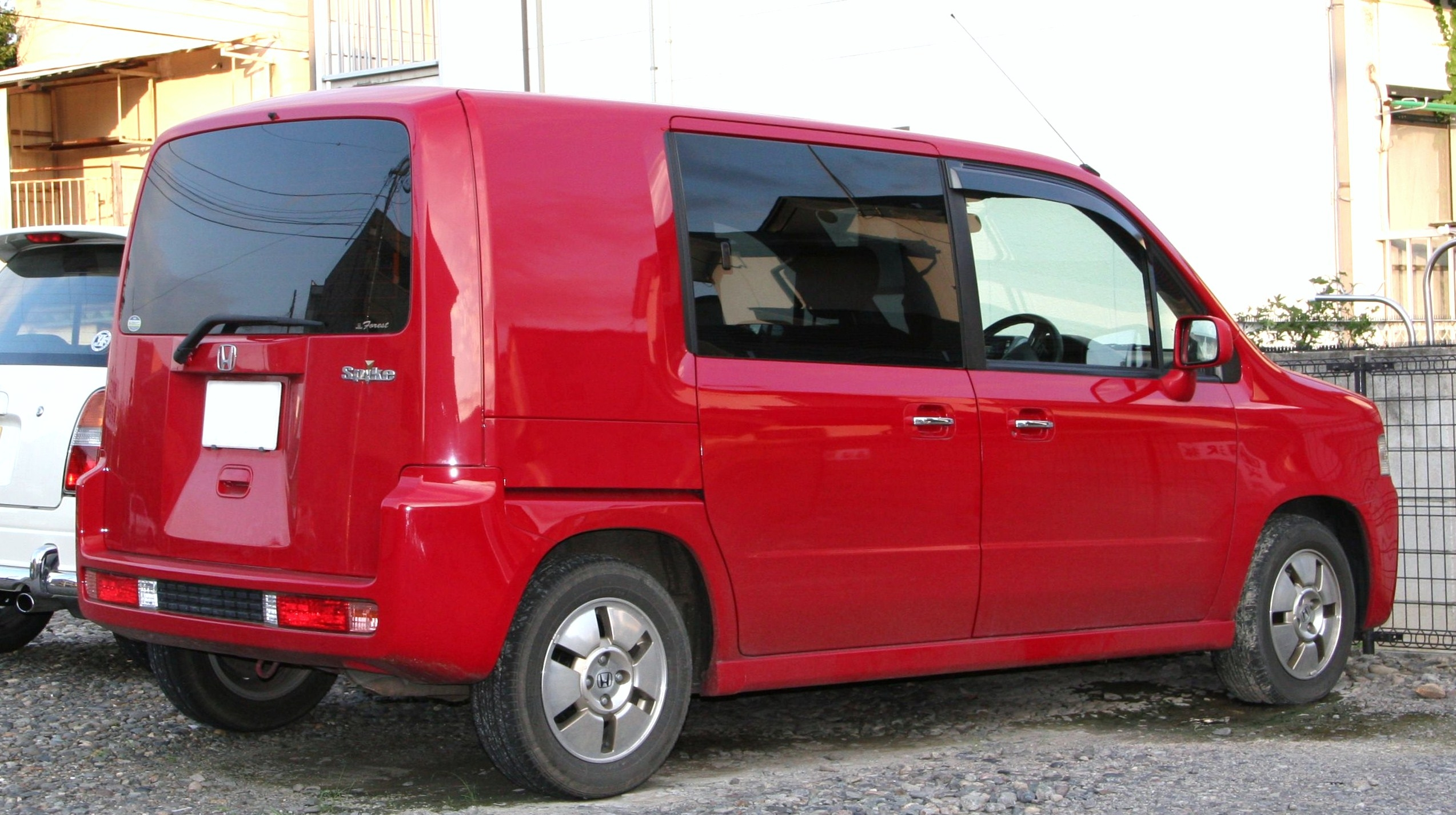
2004–2005 Mobilio Spike (pre-facelift)

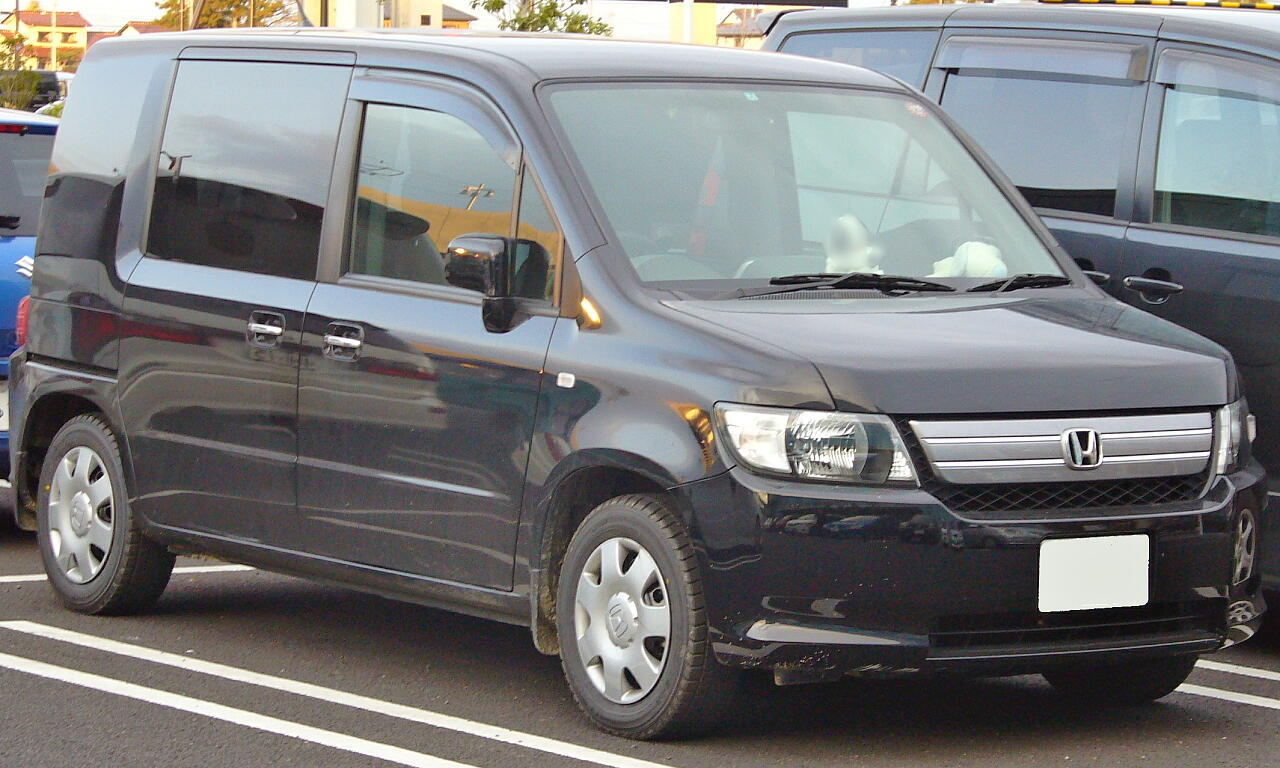
2005 Mobilio Spike (facelift)

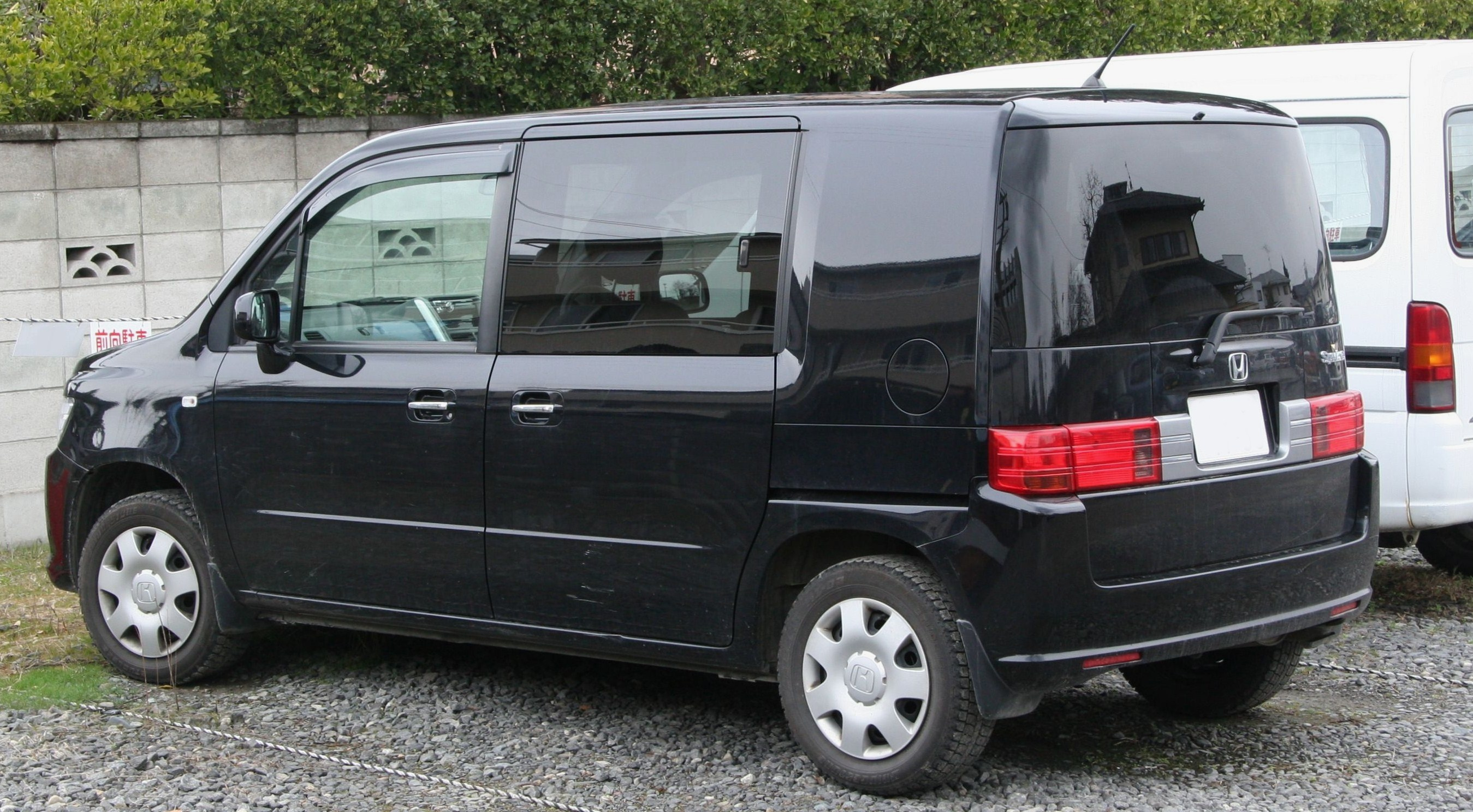
2005 Mobilio Spike (facelift)

== Second generation (DD4/5; 2014) ==
Second generation
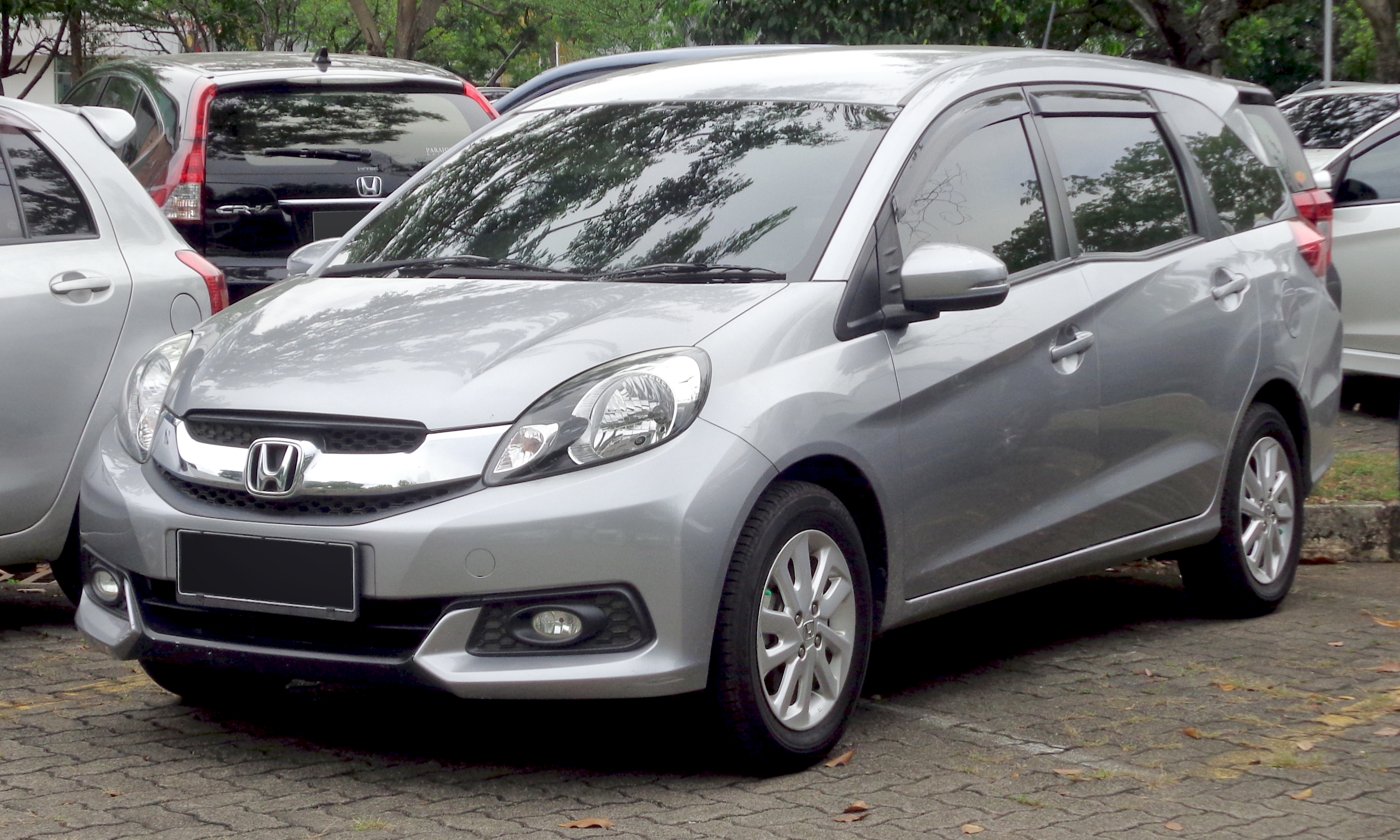
- 2016 Mobilio E (DD4; pre-facelift, Indonesia)

Overview
- Model code: DD4/5
- Production: January 2014 – June 2024
- Assembly: Indonesia: Karawang (HPM); Thailand: Ayutthaya; India: Greater Noida (Honda Cars India; until 2017)
- Designer: Keisuke Asai and Akihiko Ohhashi

Body and chassis
- Body style: 5-door MPV
- Layout: Front-engine, front-wheel-drive
- Platform: Honda Global Small Car
- Related: Honda Brio; Honda Amaze (first generation); Honda BR-V (first generation)

Powertrain
- Engine: Petrol: 1.5 L L15Z1 i-VTEC I4 (DD4); Diesel: 1.5 L N15A1 turbo i-DTEC I4-(DD5)
- Power output: 87 kW (117 hp; 118 PS) (petrol); 73.5 kW (99 hp; 100 PS) (diesel)
- Transmission: 5-speed manual; CVT

Dimensions
- Wheelbase: 2,650 mm (104.3 in)
- Length: 4,386 mm (172.7 in)
- Width: 1,683 mm (66.3 in)
- Height: 1,603 mm (63.1 in)
- Curb weight: 1,131–1,160 kg (2,493–2,557 lb) (manual); 1,170–1,178 kg (2,579–2,597 lb) (CVT); 1,214–1,254 kg (2,676–2,765 lb) (diesel)

Chronology
- Successor: Honda BR-V (DG3)

The Mobilio nameplate was revived as an MPV model based on the Brio platform, designed mainly for the Indonesian market. Developed by Honda R&D Asia Pacific, it was first unveiled as a prototype model at the 21st Indonesia International Motor Show on 19 September 2013. Production of the Mobilio began on 15 January 2014 at Honda Prospect Motor's Karawang plant and sales began on 25 January 2014 in Indonesia. Trim levels offered were S, E, E Prestige and RS (since June 2014) with either a 5-speed manual or a CVT (E, E Prestige and RS only) transmission. The second generation Mobilio is powered by either the 1.5 L L15Z1 i-VTEC petrol engine or the 1.5 L N15A1 i-DTEC diesel engine for Indian market. In the same year, the Mobilio won the Car of the Year Otomotif Award 2014 in Indonesia.

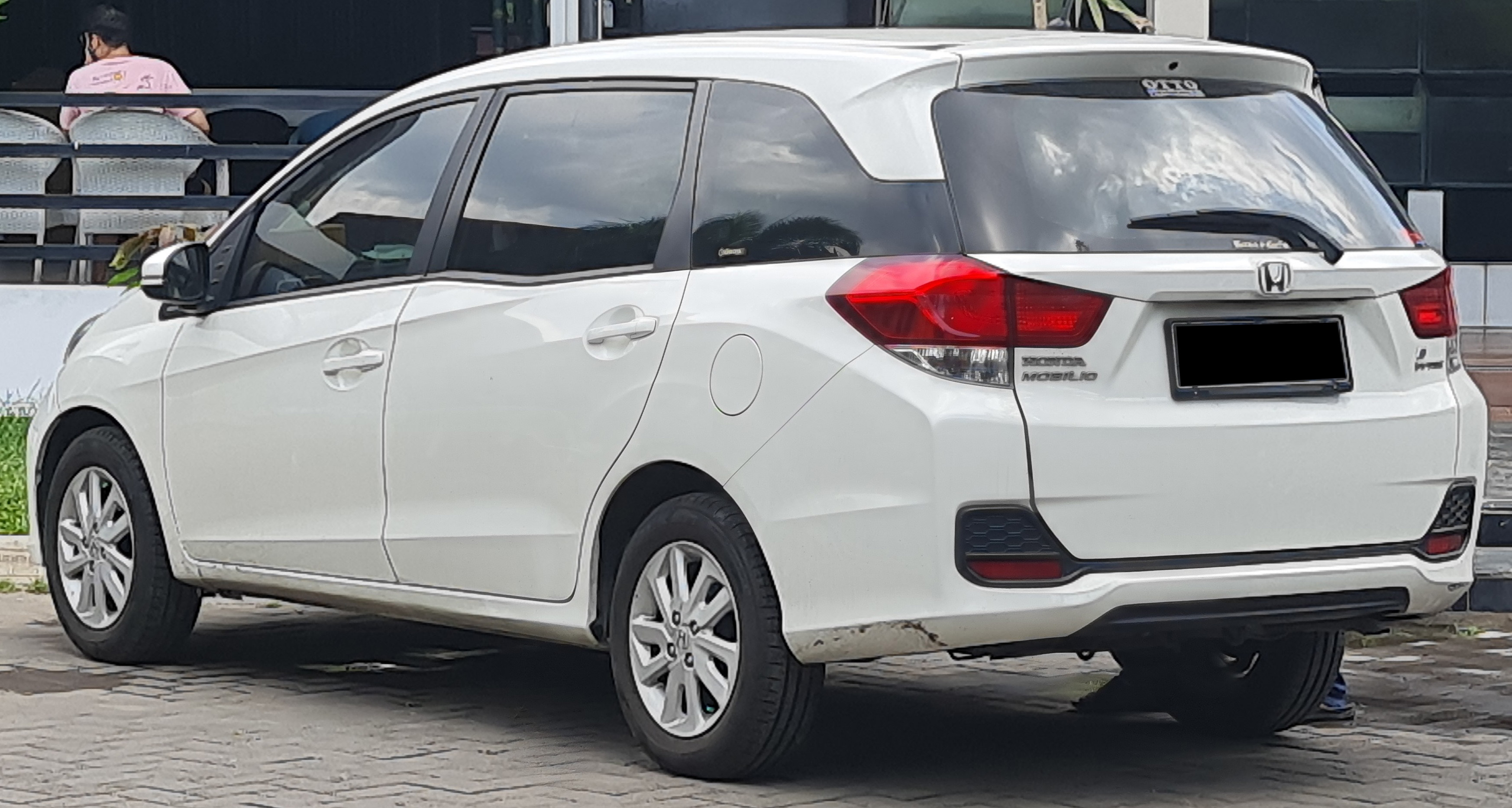
2016 Mobilio E (DD4; pre-facelift, Indonesia)

The Mobilio was also introduced into the Indian market in July 2014. In 2014, the Indian Mobilio contains over 90% local parts. It was discontinued in July 2017 due to poor sales. It was also introduced in Thailand in September 2014 and South Africa in October 2014.

The Mobilio was launched in the Philippines on 28 April 2015. All Philippine-spec Mobilios were imported from the Ayutthaya plant in Thailand. The Mobilio in the Philippines has 3 variants. The E, V and RS. It was discontinued in June 2021 due to declining sales.

On 19 January 2016, the Mobilio received a minor change in Indonesia, which introduced an updated dashboard design carried from the BR-V.

The S trim is the base model, only available with 5-speed manual. The S does not have a rear wiper, foglights, side indicators, double blower air-conditioning, nor security system. The door handles are unpainted and it has 15-inch (380 mm) steel wheels. After the facelift, the Mobilio S received some additional equipment such as the double blower air conditioning system as well as alloy wheels. The mid-range E trim of the Mobilio has 15-inch (380 mm) alloy wheels, security system, body colour painted door handles and side mirrors that comes with indicators, and double-blower air conditioning. The Mobilio E was offered either with 5-speed manual or CVT transmission, although ABS and EBD was only available for the E-CVT models until the facelift. The Prestige trim was short-lived since it was only offered from the January 2014 launch and was replaced by the Mobilio RS in June 2014. The Prestige has chrome decorations on its fog light borders, side mouldings, license plate holder, and muffler tip. The alloy wheel design was unique to the model. The Mobilio Prestige has a Kenwood 6.1-inch (150 mm) touchscreen head unit with a reversing camera view function. Throughout production, all Mobilios has front ventilated disc brakes and rear drum brakes.

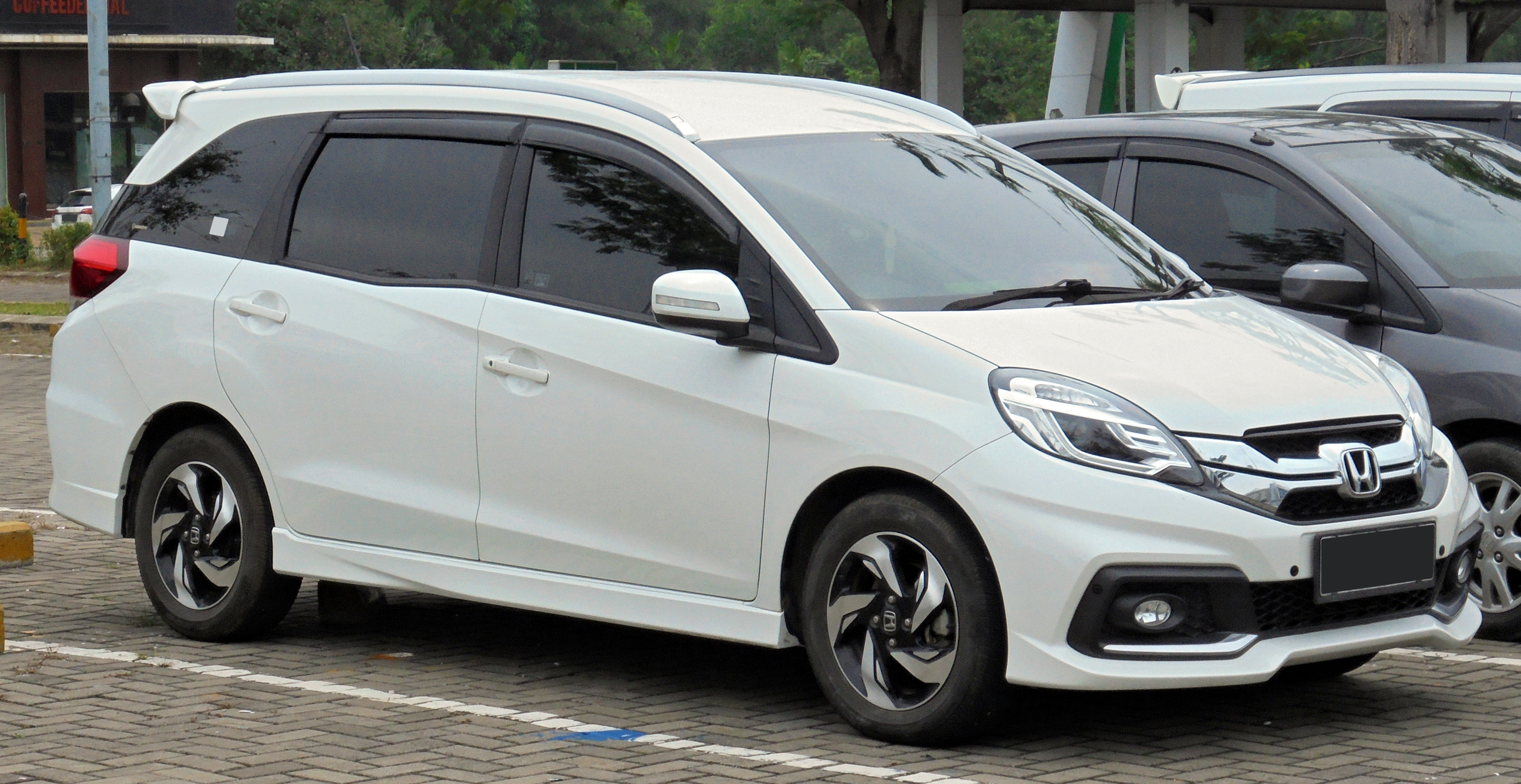
2016 Mobilio RS (DD4; pre-facelift, Indonesia)

On 19 June 2014, Honda Prospect Motor Indonesia released the sportier variant, the Mobilio RS. The RS trim came with a sporty bodykit, projector headlamps with daytime running lamps, sporty 15-inch (380 mm) alloy wheels, silver roof garnish, full black interior, silver matte door handle, speed sensing door lock, higher quality audio, and double door insulation to reduce noise in the cabin. It was offered with new colours, with Carnelian Red Pearl and Modern Steel Metallic replacing Polished Metal Metallic. Either a 5-speed manual or a CVT transmission are offered.

=== Powertrain ===
Petrol Mobilios are powered by the 1.5 litre 16-valve single-overhead camshaft L15Z1 unit, equipped with electronic fuel injection and i-VTEC. It has a 10.3:1 compression ratio and can run on 91 RON fuel. The power and torque output is rated at 118 PS (87 kW) at 6,600 rpm and 145 N⋅m (107 lb⋅ft) at 4,600 rpm. The Mobilio receives either a 5-speed manual transmission or a CVT transmission.

=== Facelift ===
On 12 January 2017, the Mobilio received a facelift, featuring redesigned front fascia and an addition of thin chrome bars on the trunk. ABS and EBD became standard on all trims.

The facelifted Mobilio is available in Thailand from May 2017 and the Philippines from July 2017.

During the 26th Indonesia International Motor Show on 19 April 2018, the Mobilio E Special Edition (CVT only) was released with a unique front grille, redesigned two-tone alloy wheels, exhaust pipe finisher, an 8-inch (200 mm) floating touchscreen display head unit, and an armrest console.

On 21 February 2019, the Indonesian market Mobilio received another update, featuring projector headlights with LED daytime running lamps exclusive to the E and RS trims. The RS trim receives the same 15-inch (380 mm), two-tone alloy wheels that are optional on the N-Box Custom kei car, while the E trim received the wheels previously used on the facelifted RS trim. The S trim received the same front grille and wheels as the Mobilio E Special Edition. The 6.2-inch (160 mm) resistive touchscreen display head unit is now standard in both S and E trims. The RS trim received a shark fin antenna, smoked tail lamps, orange accent trims on the dashboard, red stitching on the seats, redesigned meter cluster with RS logo, and an 8-inch (200 mm) capacitive touchscreen display head unit.

In April 2022 for the Indonesian market, the E and RS trims were removed from the lineup, leaving only the S trim mainly for fleet markets. The trim's front grille and wheels were reverted to the previous design from the 2017 facelift model.

The second-generation Mobilio stopped production in Indonesia in June 2024 due to shifting demands to vehicles with higher ground clearance, such as the BR-V.

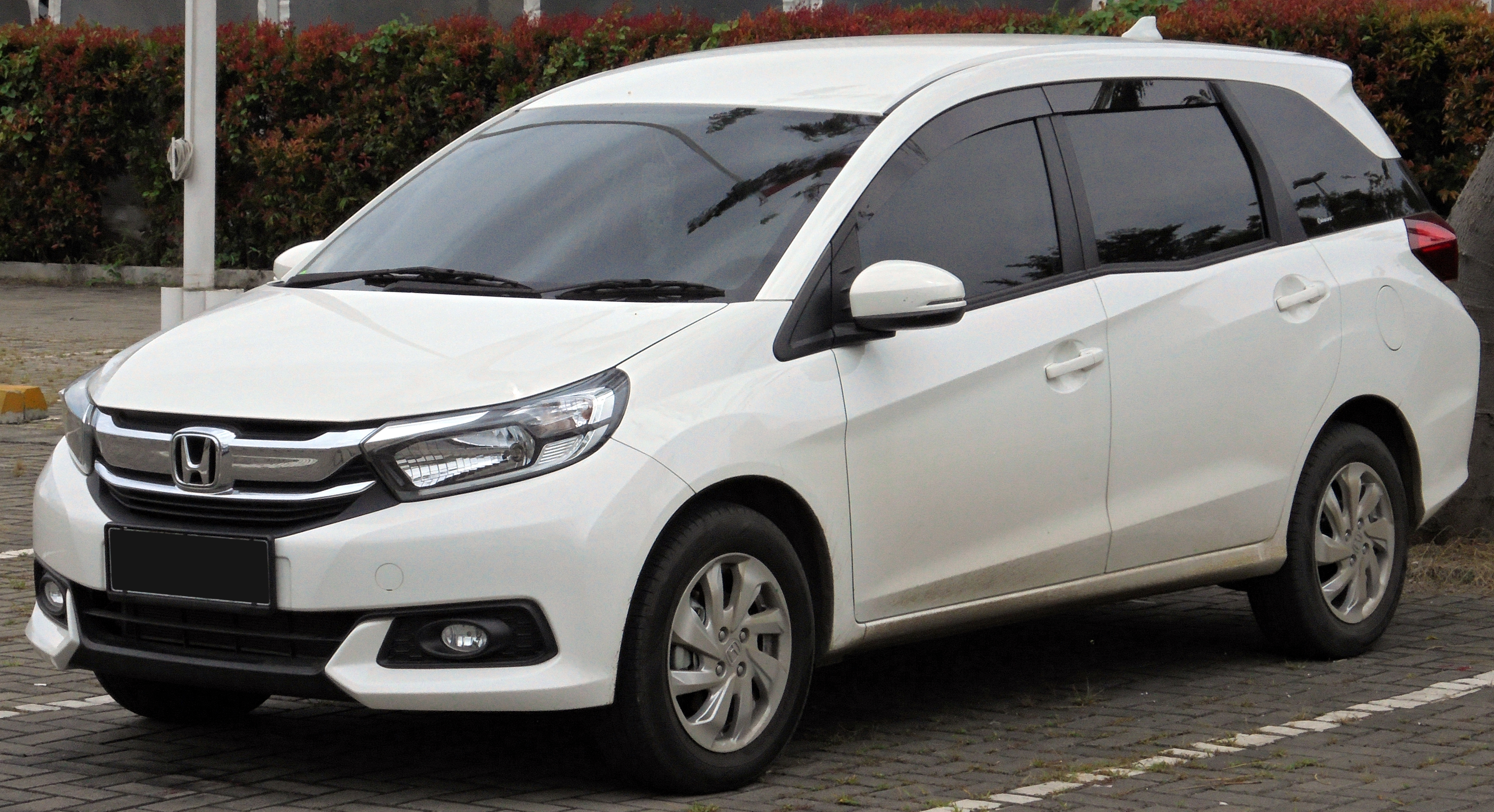
2018 Mobilio E (DD4; facelift, Indonesia)

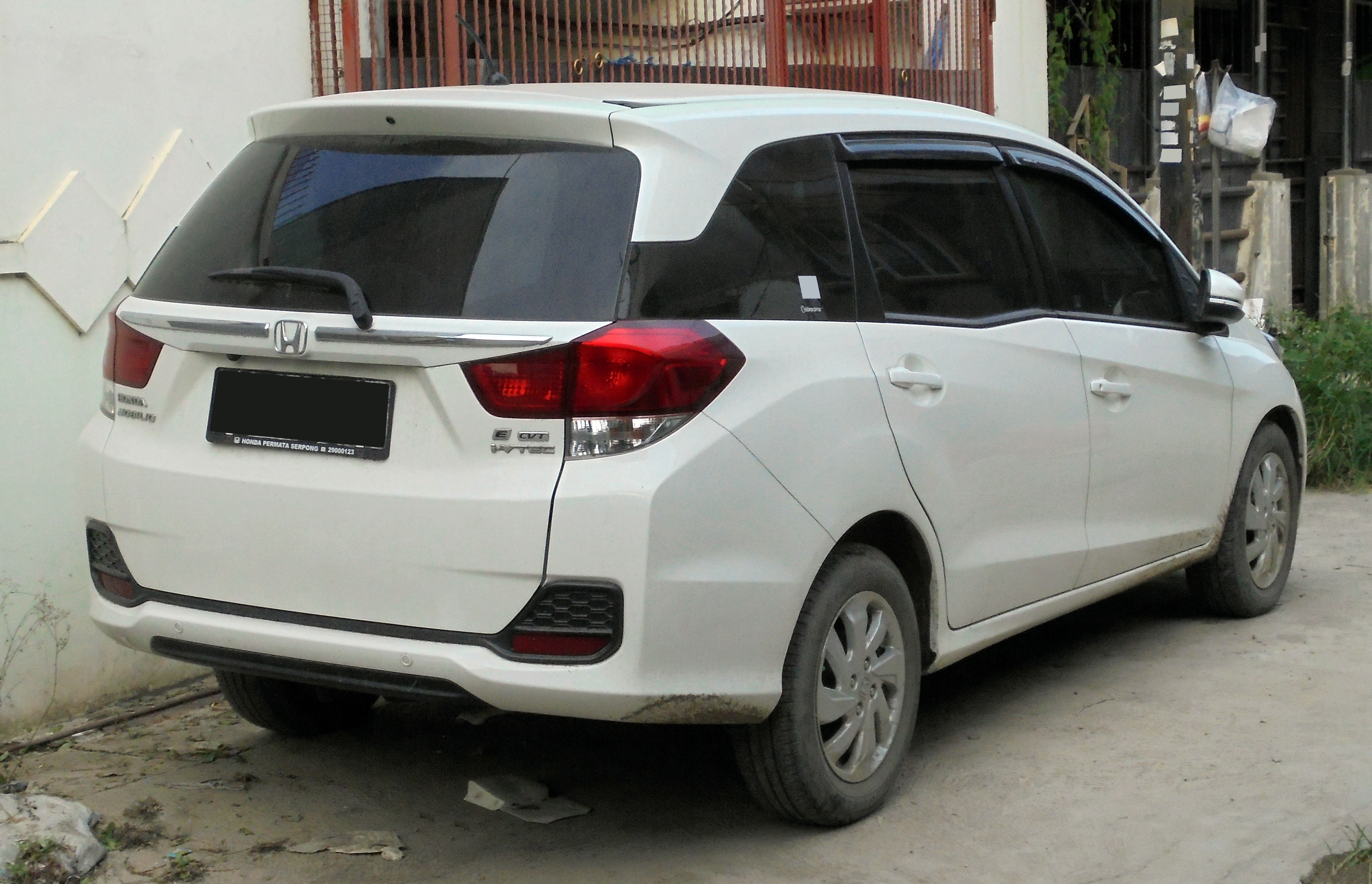
2017 Mobilio E (DD4; facelift, Indonesia)

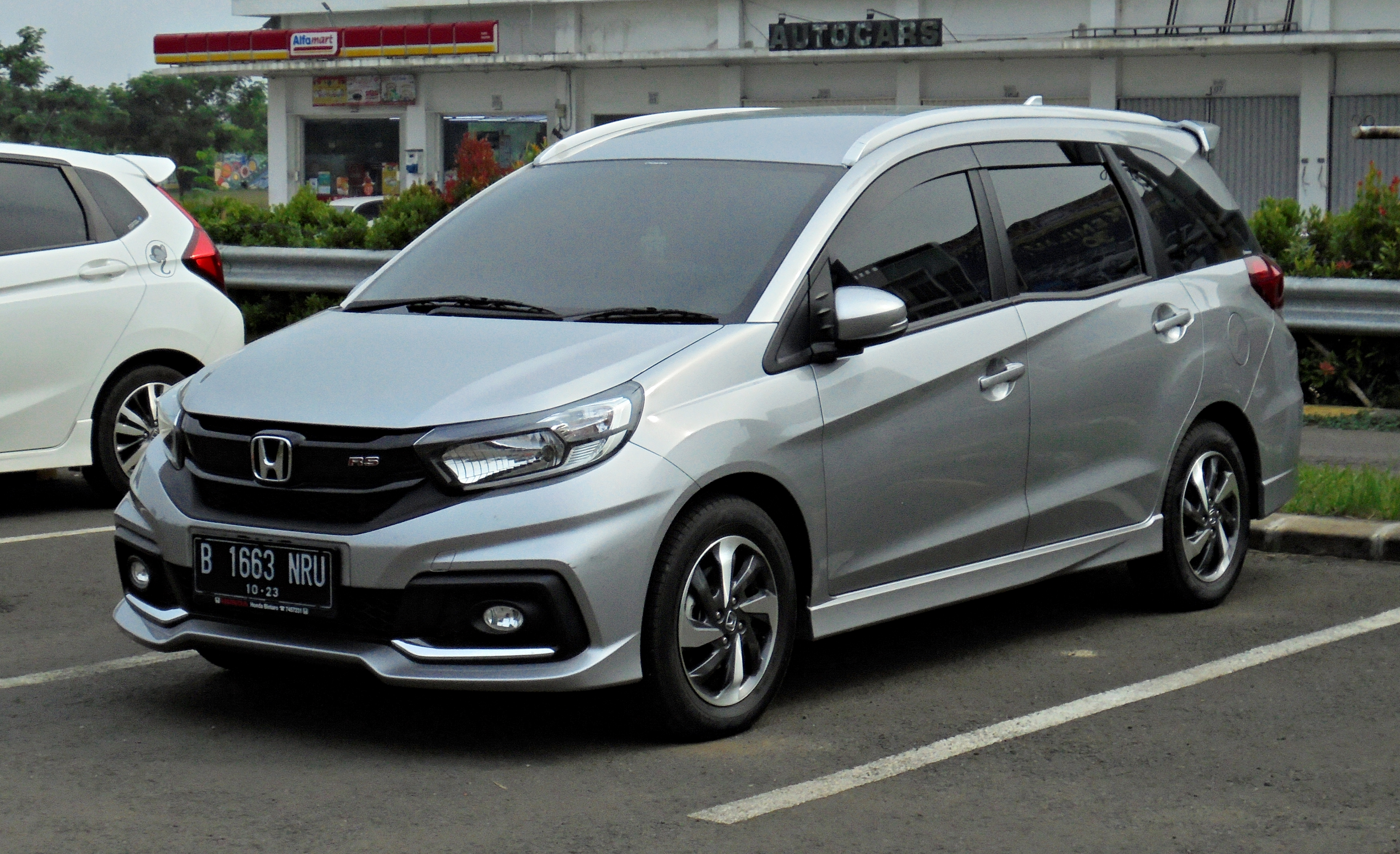
2018 Mobilio RS (DD4; facelift, Indonesia)

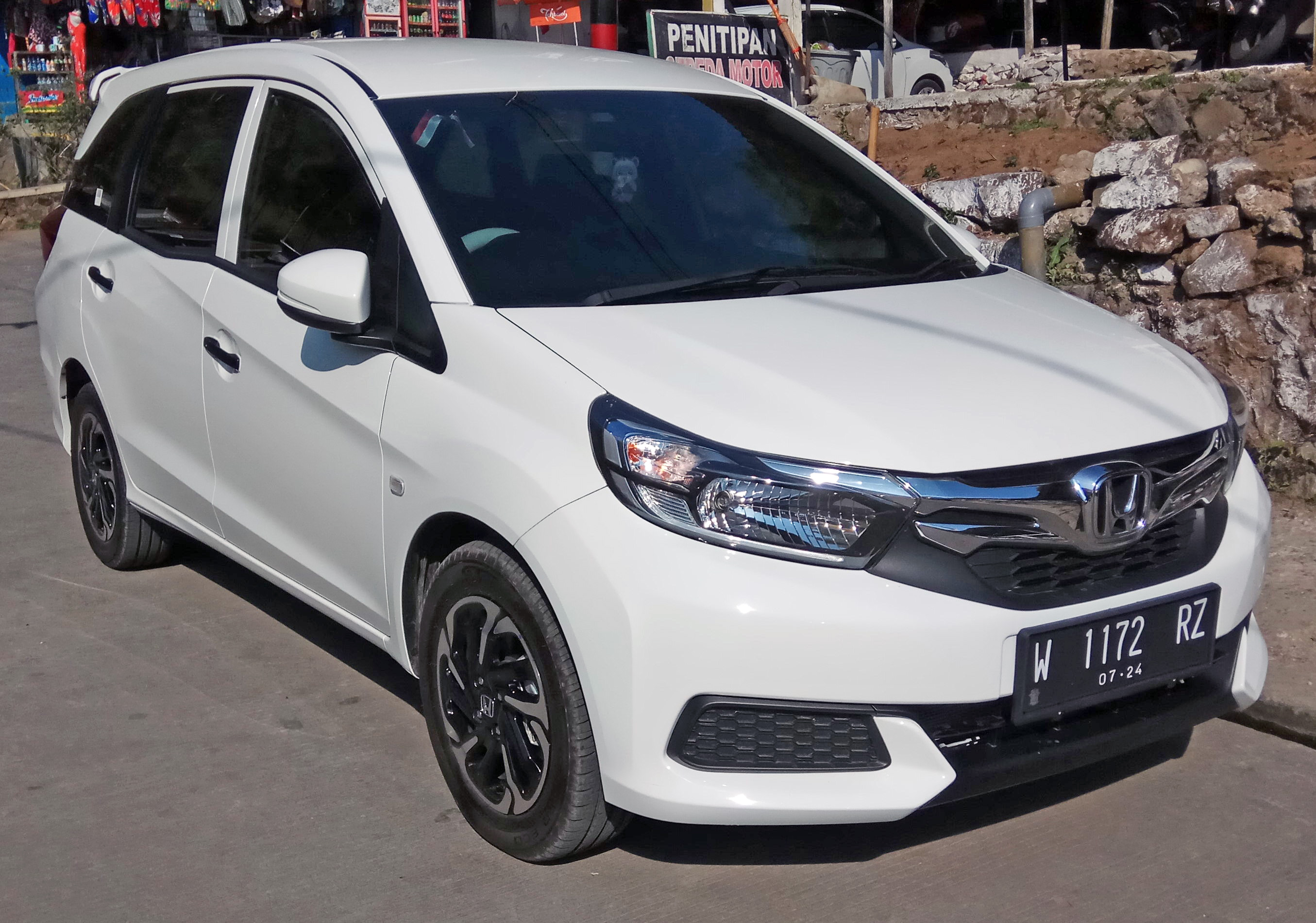
2019 Mobilio S (DD4; facelift, Indonesia)

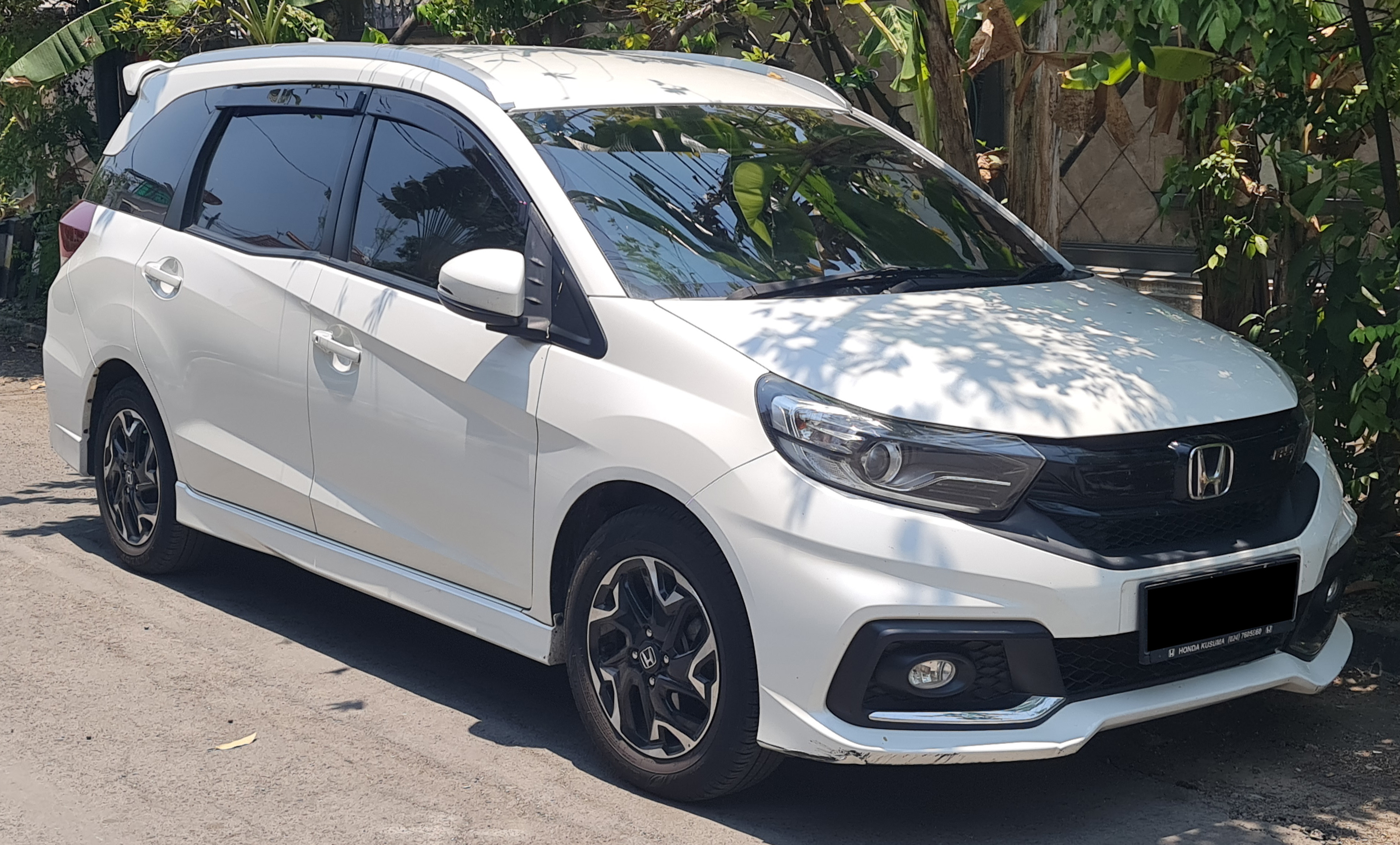
2019 Mobilio RS (DD4; facelift, Indonesia)

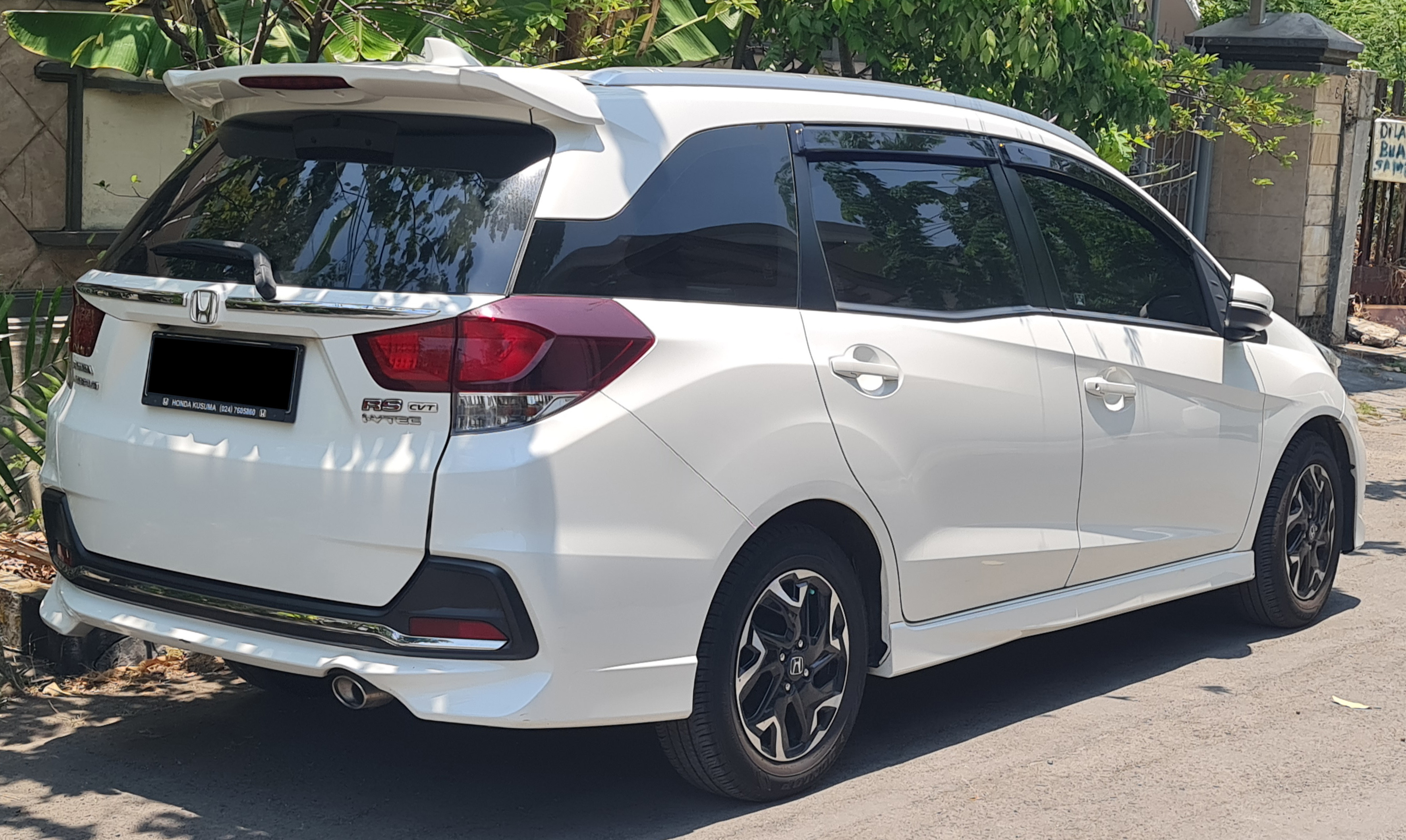
2019 Mobilio RS (DD4; facelift, Indonesia)

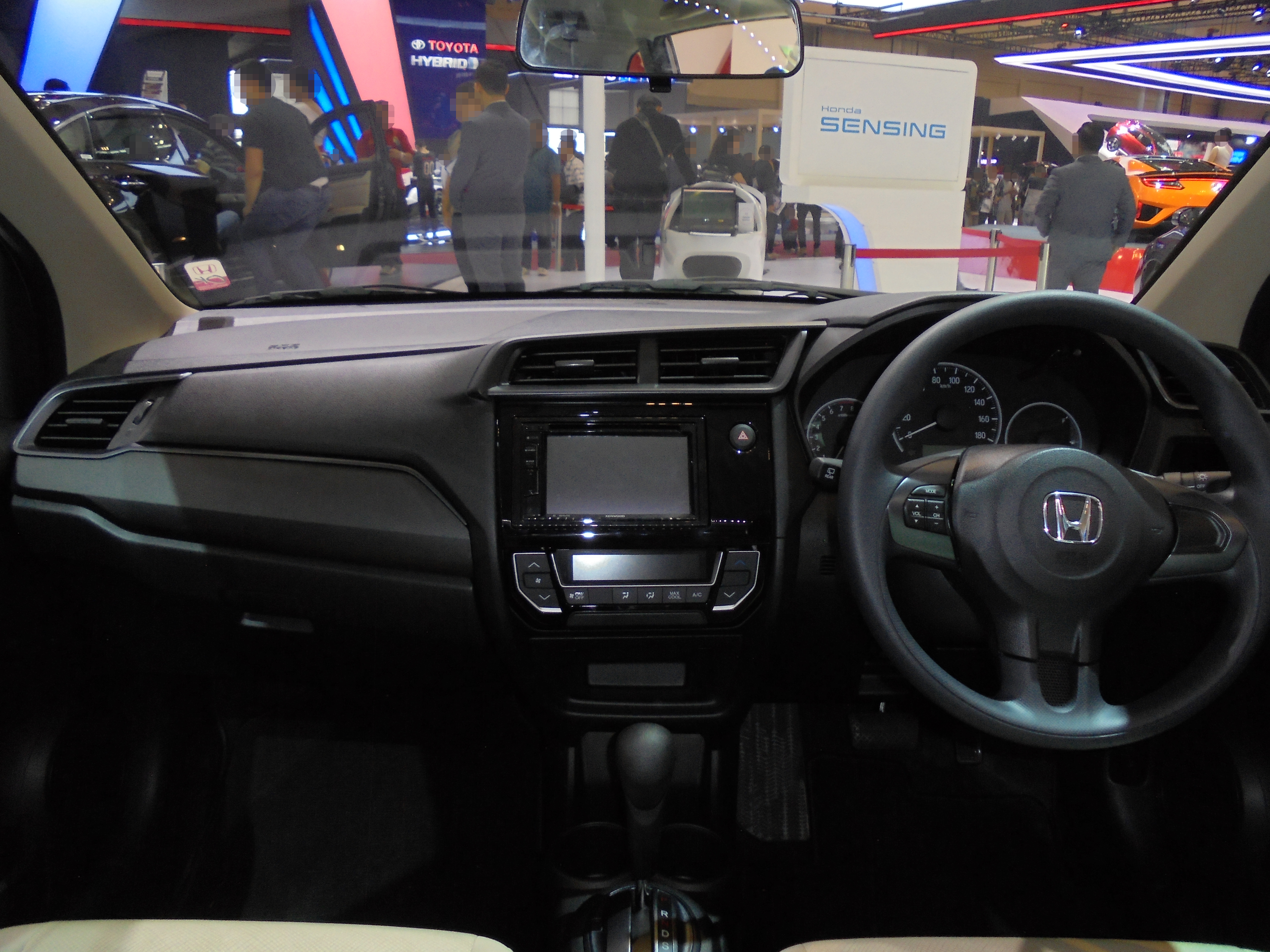
2019 Mobilio E interior (facelift, Indonesia)

=== Safety ===
The Mobilio for India with no airbags and no ABS received 0 stars for adult occupants and 1 star for toddlers from Global NCAP 1.0 (similar to Latin NCAP 2013) in 2016.

Global NCAP 1.0 test results (India) Honda Mobilio – No Airbags (2016, similar to Latin NCAP 2013)
Test	Score	Stars
Adult occupant protection	0.00/17.00	0 /5 stars
Child occupant protection	20.42/49.00	1 /5 stars

The Mobilio for India with 2 airbags and no ABS received 3 stars for adult occupants and 2 stars for toddlers from Global NCAP 1.0 in 2016 (similar to Latin NCAP 2013).

Global NCAP 1.0 test results (India) Honda Mobilio – 2 Airbags (2016, similar to Latin NCAP 2013)
Test	Score	Stars
Adult occupant protection	9.85/17.00	3 /5 stars
Child occupant protection	16.82/49.00	2 /5 stars

== Sales ==
At the end of August 2014 year to date, Honda sold 110,457 units and increased by 78 percent from last year of the same period, the Mobilio made a debut with 59,377 sales units or about 54 percent of all Honda sales. The Mobilio became Honda's top seller in Indonesia for 2016.

Year	Thailand	Indonesia	Philippines	India
2014	3,101	79,288		22,896
2015	5,825	42,932	2,543	14,474
2016	1,215	28,981	3,988	3,355
2017	2,677	26,023	3,009	63
2018	2,082	24,373	2,190	
2019	1,388	15,318	513	
2020		5,668	169	
2021		5,566	58	
2022		1,200		
2023		1,442		
2024		421		
