= Honda Fit (first generation) =

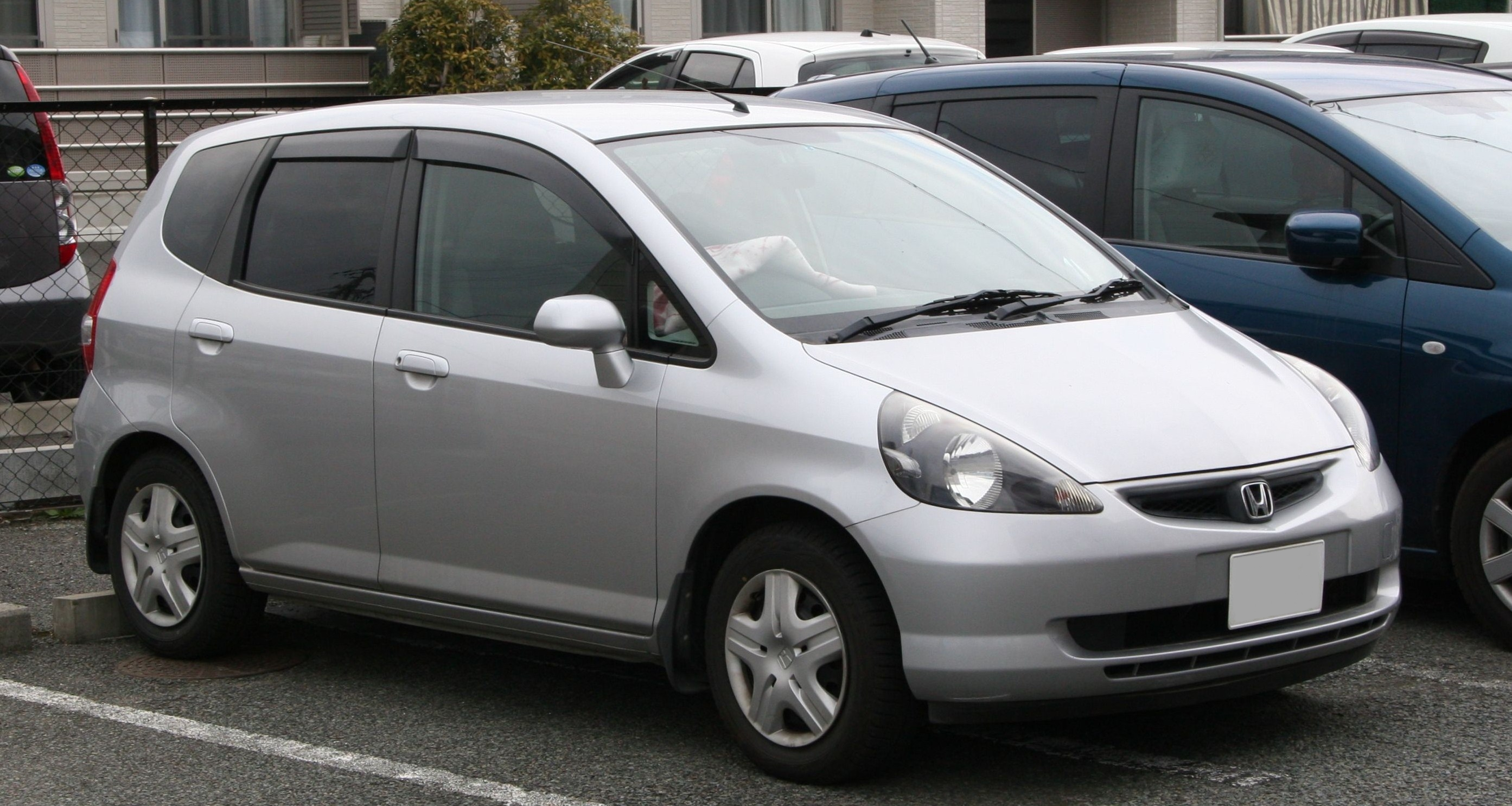
- Honda Fit (Japan; pre-facelift)

Overview
- Manufacturer: Honda
- Model code: GD1; GD2; GD3; GD4; GD5; GE1; GE2; GE3
- Also called: Honda Jazz
- Production: June 2001 – 2008
- Model years: 2007–2008 (North America)
- Assembly: Japan: Suzuka, Mie; China: Guangzhou (Guangqi Honda); Guangzhou (CHAC, export); Thailand: Ayutthaya; Indonesia: Karawang (HPM); Philippines: Santa Rosa; Brazil: Sumaré, São Paulo
- Designer: Mitsuhiro Honda

Body and chassis
- Class: Subcompact car (B)
- Body style: 5-door hatchback
- Layout: Front-engine, front-wheel-drive Front-engine, all-wheel-drive (Japan)
- Platform: Honda Global Small Car
- Related: Honda City/Fit Aria (fourth generation); Honda Airwave

Powertrain
- Engine: Petrol: 1.2 L L12A i-DSI I4 (Europe); 1.3 L L13A i-DSI I4; 1.5 L L15A i-DSI I4; 1.5 L L15A VTEC I4
- Transmission: 5-speed manual; 5-speed automatic; CVT

Dimensions
- Wheelbase: 2,450 mm (96.5 in)
- Length: 3,830–3,850 mm (150.8–151.6 in) (Worldwide); 4,000 mm (157.4 in) (U.S. & Canada)
- Width: 1,675 mm (65.9 in)
- Height: 1,525–1,550 mm (60.0–61.0 in)
- Curb weight: 980–1,100 kg (2,161–2,425 lb)

Chronology
- Predecessor: Honda Logo
- Successor: Honda Fit (second generation)

The first generation Honda Fit is a subcompact car or supermini manufactured by Honda from 2001 to 2008. It debuted in June 2001 in Japan and subsequently was introduced in Europe (early 2002), Australia (late 2002), South America (early 2003), South Africa and Southeast Asia (2003), China (September 2004), and Mexico (late 2005).

The Fit's fuel tank under the front seat and compact rear suspension enable the rear seats to fold especially low, creating a flexible and regularised cargo volume that is large for its class.

A production model for the United States and Canada debuted on January 8, 2006, at the North American International Auto Show in Detroit. The car was released in Canada on April 3, 2006, and in the U.S. on April 20, 2006, as a 2007 model year. In North American markets, the first-generation Fit was replaced after only two model years by a new 2009 model, which was released for Japan in November 2007 as a 2008 model. Subsequent iterations would maintain the same platforms worldwide.

== Models ==
The first-generation Fit was sold in 6 variations while its City/Fit Aria sedan sibling was sold in 4 variations.

All first generation Fit/Jazz models throughout the world used the following distinct GD or GE codes, found in the vehicle's identification number (VIN):

Fit/Jazz

- GD1: 1.3 L L13A i-DSI inline-four 2WD (Europe: 1.4 L)
- GD2: 1.3 L L13A i-DSI inline-four 4WD (Japan only)
- GD3: 1.5 L L15A VTEC inline-four 2WD
- GD4: 1.5 L L15A VTEC inline-four 4WD (Japan only)
- GD5: 1.2 L L12A i-DSI inline-four (Europe)
- GE3: 1.3 L L13A i-DSI inline-four 2WD (2007 Europe 1.4 L model. Made in China)

== Drivetrain and platform ==
Depending on the region, the Fit is available with a 1.2-, 1.3- (in Europe referred as 1.4 L model), 1.5-liter i-DSI engine, or 1.5-liter VTEC engine. All four engines are based on Honda's L-series engine family. The eight-valve i-DSI (intelligent Dual and Sequential Ignition) engines use two spark plugs per cylinder, allowing gasoline to burn more completely; therefore, fuel consumption and emissions are reduced while maximum torque at mid-range rpm is maintained. The 1.5 L VTEC engine has the typical 16-valve configuration that can maximise output at high rpm.

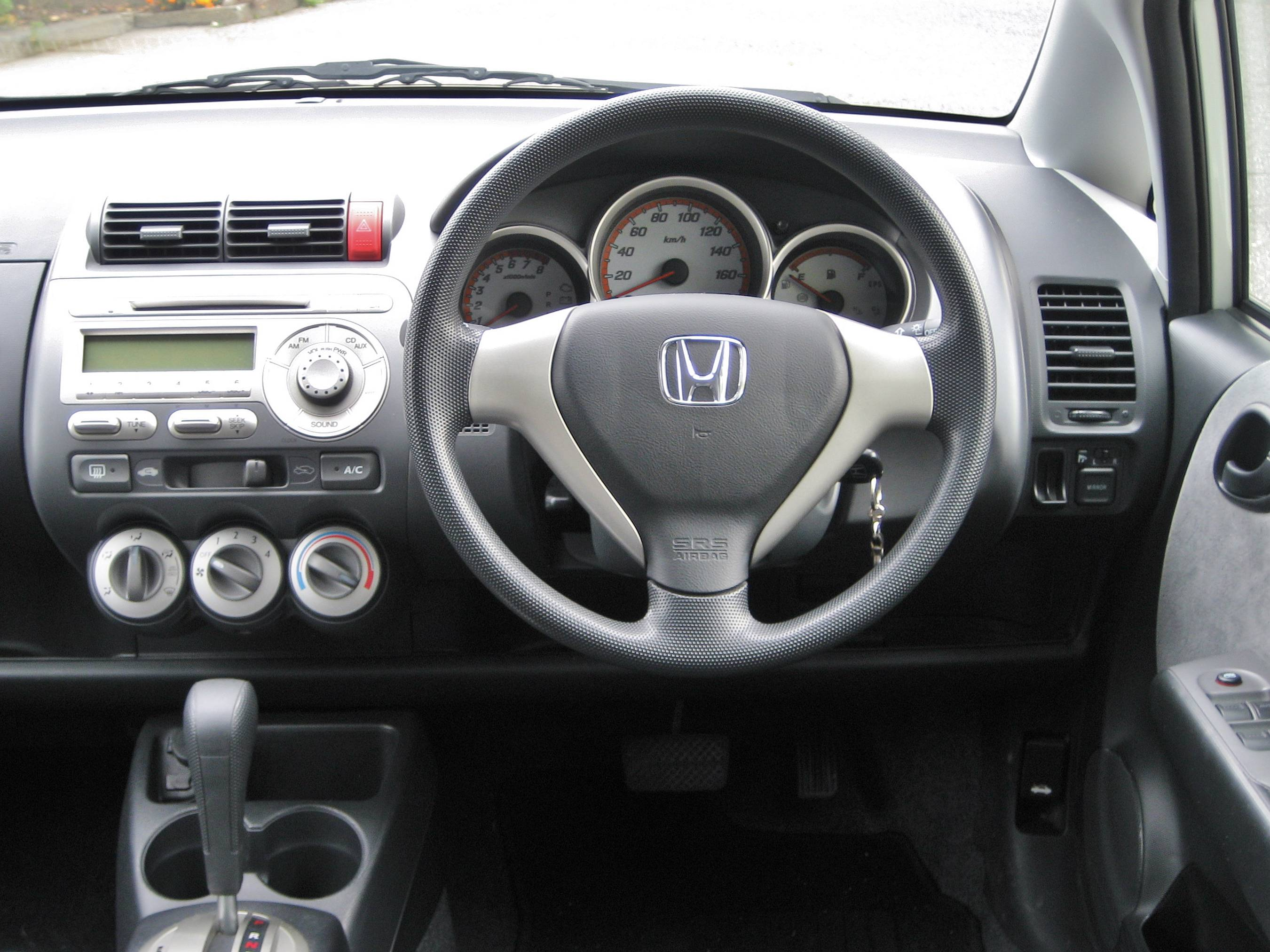
Interior

The engines are mated to a five-speed manual, five-speed automatic, and continuously variable transmission (CVT), depending on the region (CVT not offered in United States prior to 2015). Two forms of CVT are offered: the regular, and CVT-7. The latter offers a smooth, continuous flow of power, or seven simulated "gears" controlled by paddle shifters on the steering column.

The Fit uses Honda's Global Small Car platform, which is also used by Fit Aria/City (a sedan version of the Fit), the Airwave (a station wagon version of Fit Aria/City), the Mobilio, and Mobilio Spike.

== Interior packaging concept ==
External images
- Honda Fit fuel tank location
- Ultra Seat (Normal mode)
- Ultra Seat (Tall mode)
- Ultra Seat (Utility mode)
- Ultra Seat (Long mode)
- Ultra Seat (Refresh mode)
- Ultra Luggage (Regular mode)
- Ultra Luggage (Tall mode)
- Ultra Luggage (upper/lower mode)

The Fit's central fuel tank location under the front rather than rear seats — combined with a compact, semi-independent, H-shaped torsion beam rear suspension — allows for a lower load platform and increased cargo volume. Noted for its "class leading utilization of interior space and maximum flexibility for people or cargo," the Fit offered approximately twice the storage space behind its rear seat compared with the Toyota Yaris hatchback.

Ultra Seat: The fuel tank and rear suspension layout also allows a multiple-mode seating system, marketed by Honda as Ultra Seat (Asia) and Magic Seat (North America, Oceania), with four seating modes — and a fifth in certain markets:

- Normal: seats are in their normal position with seating for five.
- Utility: Either section (or both) of the 60:40 split rear seat folds and lowers onto itself, creating a flat load surface and increased cargo area.
- Long: The rear seat behind the passenger folds down similar to utility mode, but the front passenger seat folds backward, leaving an area that can hold items as long as 2.4 meters (7.9 ft).
- Tall: Either section (or both) of the rear seat cushion fold up against the rear seat back, allowing for an area of 1.28 meters (4.2 ft) in height.
- Refresh: With the headrest of the front seat removed, the front seat back can be folded down to form a lounge-style sitting area. This was not available in all markets.

According to the Fit's chief engineer, Kohei Hitomi, the Magic/Ultra seating system's design "came about after the design team had spent long hours watching people in supermarkets and how they stored their things."

Ultra Luggage: In certain markets, Honda offers the Fit/Jazz without a spare tire, a system marketed as Ultra Luggage, where the spare tire well is used as part of a 'Tall' mode cargo area behind the rear seats. A flexible flap allows three configurations of rear storage: Regular, Tall and Upper/Lower mode.

== Production ==
The first-generation Fit was produced at six locations, in Suzuka, Japan; Sumaré, Brazil; Guangzhou, China; Ayutthaya, Thailand; Karawang, Indonesia; and Laguna, Philippines. Models produced in Japan were for Honda's home market, Europe, some Asian markets, Australia (till the end of 2005), Canada and the United States. Models for the Malaysian, Singaporean, and Vietnamese markets are produced in Thailand. The Brazilian factory supplied Mexico, all of Latin America and the Caribbean. Chinese models were sold in mainland China, and products from a dedicated export plant were exported to some left-hand-drive European markets, while Jazz models in Hong Kong were imported from Japan.

== Markets ==
=== Japan ===
Two engines (1.3 i-DSI and 1.5 VTEC) were offered, each with a number of trim lines ranging from the basic "Y" to the sporty "S". The 1.3 L i-DSI was available with only the regular CVT automatic. The 1.5 L VTEC model with CVT-7 was added in September 2002. A five-speed manual was added in June 2004 for FWD model with the larger engine. The Fit is also available in 4WD here. Starting at a price of about JPY1,123,000 is the basic 1.3Y model. At the top of the range is the 1.5W four-wheel-drive version for JPY1,743,000. A bewildering range of options and accessories are available at most levels, including Honda's HDD GPS Navigation System called Internavi with its 6.5-inch (170 mm) colour screen. This system incorporates TV and FM radio. In Japan, the Fit replaced the market segment previously served by the seventh-generation Honda Civic and shared a platform with the fourth-generation Honda City, when the Civic no longer complied with Japanese Government dimension regulations when the Civic exceeded the 1700 mm width dimension.

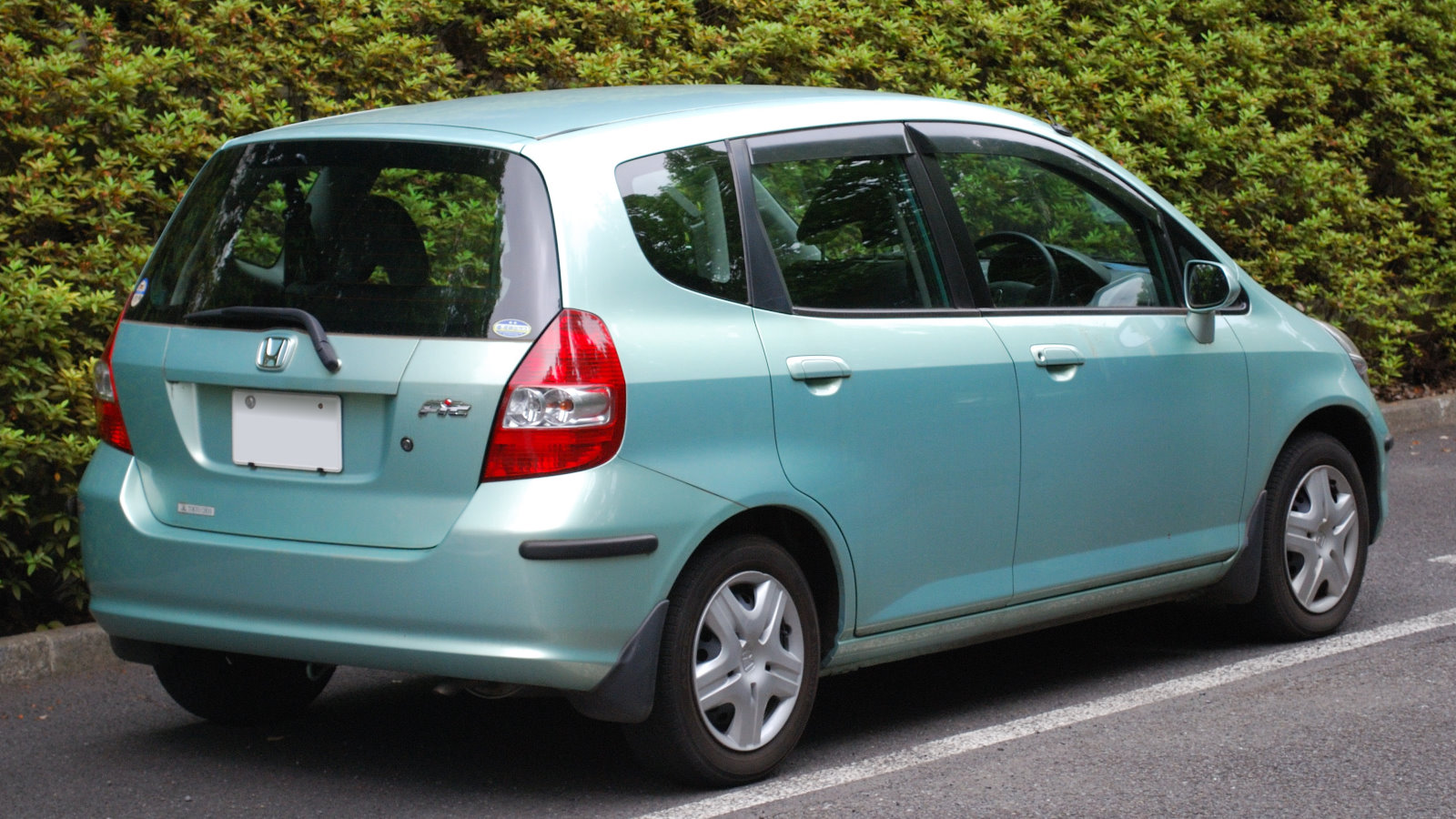
Honda Fit (Japan; pre-facelift)

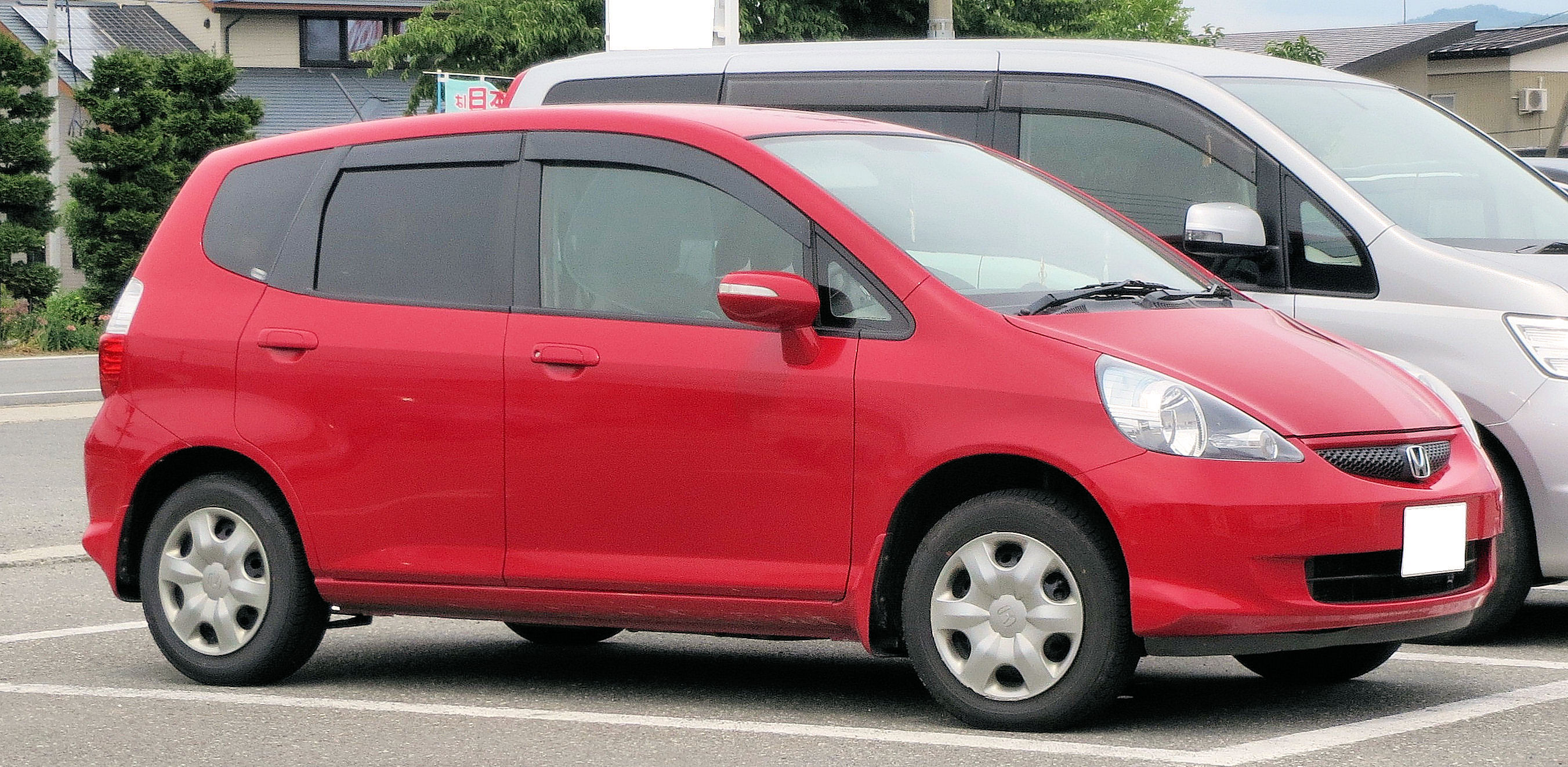
Honda Fit (Japan; facelift)

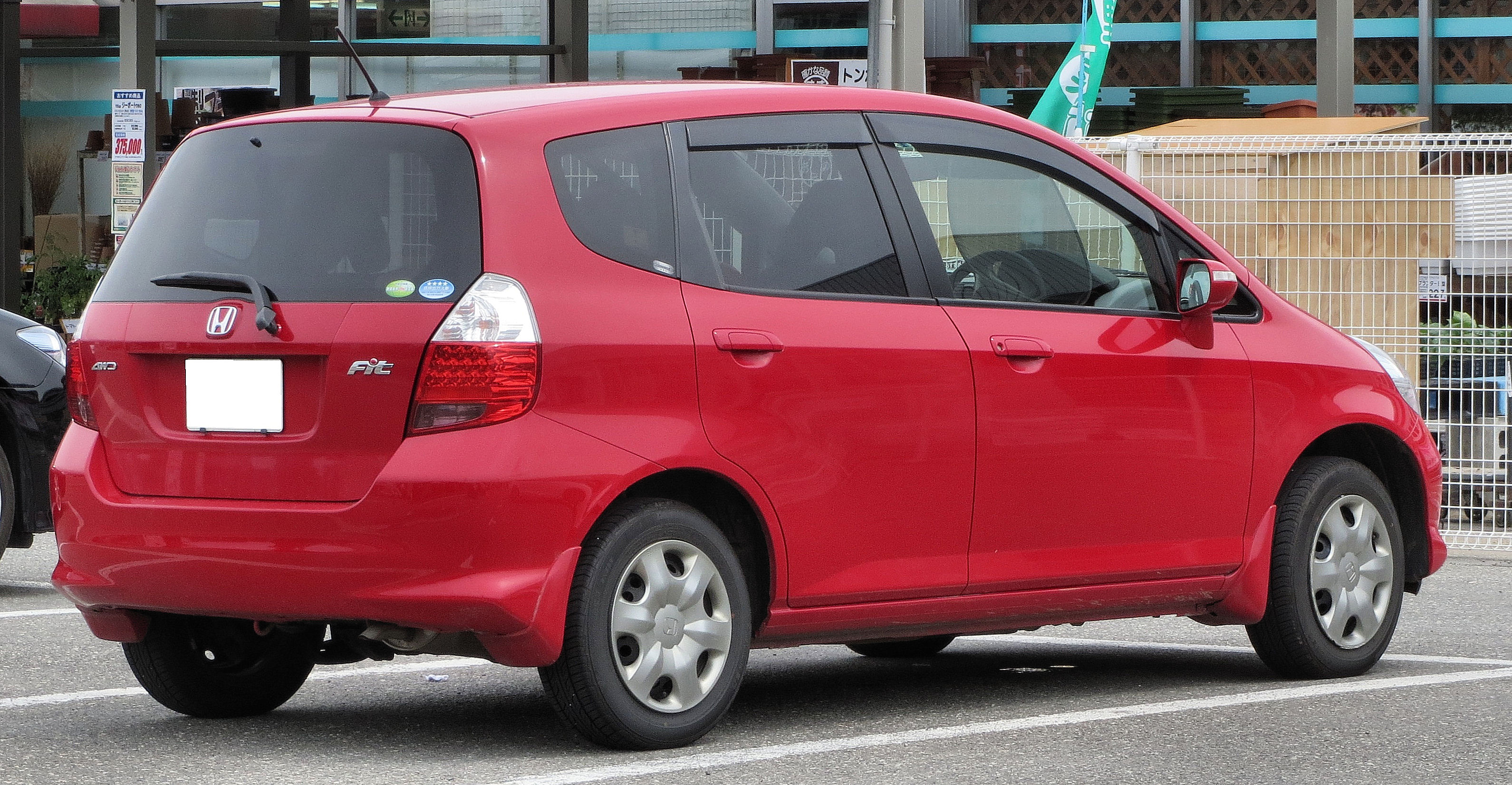
Honda Fit (Japan; facelift)

=== Europe ===
Like Japan, the European Honda Jazz also has two engines available. The European-only 1.2 i-DSI is offered as the base model in many countries, and can be purchased only with a five-speed manual transmission. The 1.4 i-DSI is identical to the 1,339 cc 1.3 i-DSI sold in Japan, but marketed as a 1.4 L to differentiate it from the smaller 1.2 L engine (at 1,244 cc, it is closer to 1.3 L than the bigger one is to 1.4 L). 1.4 L models started out well-equipped with the 5-speed manual standard and CVT-7 available as an option.

All European Jazz models have Anti-lock braking system (ABS) with front disc brakes and rear drum brakes or disc brakes. Side airbags are standard on high end models.

The Jazz has been Honda's best-selling model, comprising 30% of European sales.

=== China ===
Local production and sale of the Fit (Hatchback) in China started in September 2004, roughly one year after the launch of the sedan version 'Fit saloon' (City/Fit Aria) in September 2003. The trims are similar to those in Japan; with the combination of 1.3 i-DSI, 1.5 VTEC, five-speed manual, and CVT, there are four models in total.

=== North America ===
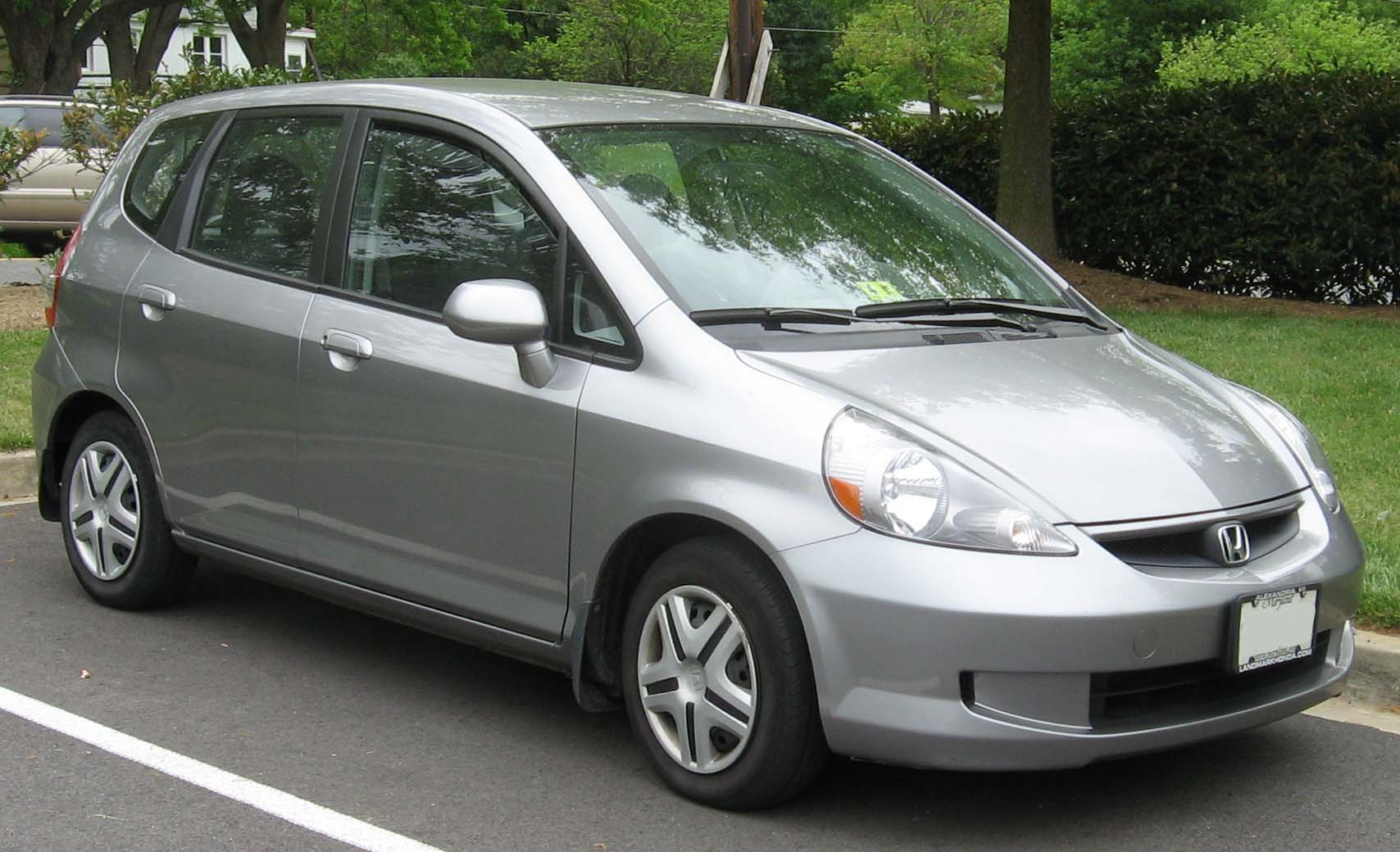
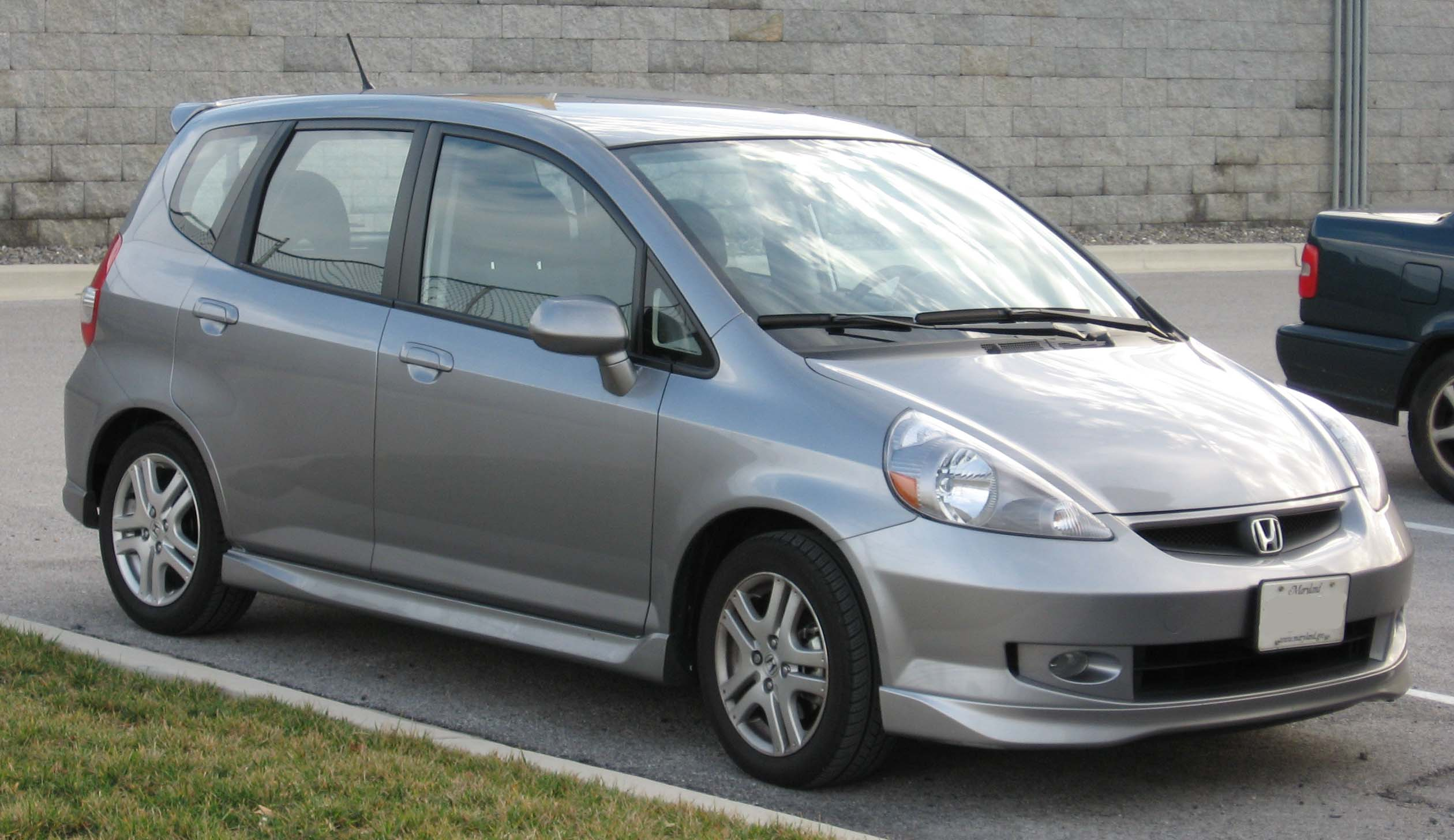
2007 Honda Fit base and Sport (US)

The Fit went on sale in the United States and Canada in April 2006 for the 2007 model year, replacing the seventh-generation Civic hatchback for North America and becoming that market's chief entry-level subcompact. The Civic continues to grow in size and price and was reclassified as a compact (larger than a subcompact) in 2001.

In keeping with Honda's safety initiative, the Fit was offered in North America with power windows, standard side airbags, side-curtain airbags, and ABS, in addition to the mandatory front airbags. Due to differing safety regulations, North American Fits have larger bumpers and a longer front clip than the rest of the world, resulting in a slight increase in overall length.

For the 2008 model year, U.S. models feature the Tire Pressure Monitoring System (TPMS) to alert the driver of low pressure in any of the four stock wheels. Unlike some systems, the system in the 2008 Fit notifies the driver that a tire is low, but not which tire. The Fit narrowly missed qualifying for the Canadian government's $1,000 rebate, which is only offered for cars that meet the new federal fuel efficiency rating. Honda Canada Inc. decided to reimburse consumers the rebate for 2007, and a revision to the federal ratings allowed the 2008 Fit to qualify for the $1,000 rebate.

The Fit was offered in two variants in the United States (Base and Sport), and three in Canada (DX, LX and Sport). Differences were primarily limited to cosmetics and standard equipment, since all models shared the same 1.5 L 109 hp (81 kW) engine and standard five-speed manual transmission. A conventional five-speed automatic transmission was optional, instead of the automatic CVT found throughout the rest of the world. The Fit Sport model received paddle shifters mounted behind the steering wheel when ordered with the automatic.

For the 2006 calendar year, 27,934 Fits were sold in the United States. A total of 56,432 Fits were sold in the United States in 2007.

The 2008 Honda Fit was largely unchanged from the 2007 model with the exception of TPMS and new windshield wipers that abandon the large rubber-blade design to a more traditional rigid plastic with thin rubber-blade design. MSRP was also increased by roughly US$100. Total sales in the United States for the year were 79,794, an increase of almost 41% over previous year.

==== Reception ====
Honda marketed the Fit as "Small is the New Big".

Car and Driver magazine described, that "not only is it endowed with an impressive array of standard features and an upscale interior, but its dynamics rival the responses of cars with much fancier pedigrees and price tags." The magazine even cited its lane-change number of 71.4 mph edged the best run by a Ferrari F430 Spider F1 tested. The car was included in Car and Driver′s "10 Best Lists" three times. In May 2006, the Fit was placed first in a Car and Driver comparison of seven economy cars that included Nissan Versa and Toyota Yaris.

Consumer Guide said in its review, "While prices seem steep for a subcompact (compared to the Toyota Yaris and Nissan Versa), this is one in name and exterior size only; it's really a small wagon that challenges some compact SUVs for room while getting significantly better fuel economy".

=== Mexico ===
Fit, sourced from Brazil, was launched in October 2005.

=== Brazil ===
Honda started local production and sale of Fit in April 2003 when Brazil became the second production base, after Japan, for Fit. In Brazil, though initially was available with the 1.3 L i-DSI engine only, eventually the Fit has the same engines as the Japanese models (all Brazilian Honda cars have engines imported from Japan) and there are three trim levels available. Base model LX features the 1.35 i-DSI engine (which is marketed as 1.4 in Brazil) and driver side airbag. The second model in the range, the LXL, features the same engine from the LX, but adds some extra equipment: passenger side airbag and ABS. Top model EX has essentially the same equipment as the LXL, but comes with the 1.5 VTEC engine. All models are available with the five-speed manual or the regular CVT automatic. There are neither side airbags nor side curtains available for the Brazilian version. Also, the radio antenna is positioned differently, as it is near the front of the roof. Honda started selling the 2007 model in February 2006 with new bumpers and some cosmetic changes.

Alcohol (ethanol) and gasoline hybrid Fit: Honda Brazil began sales in mid-December 2006, only for the 1.35 i-DSI. 80 hp (60 kW) at 100% gasoline and 83 hp (62 kW) at 100% alcohol. It also works with any intermediary mix rate. There is an additional gasoline fuel tank on the right side under the triangle window for low temperature starts.

Honda Fit was awarded by Quatro Rodas magazine as Best Buy in 2005 and 2006, and as the car with happiest buyers in 2004, 2005, 2006 and 2007.

=== South Africa ===
Launched in 2003, it was sold as the Jazz in South Africa. It is available with the 1.3 i-DSI (badged as a 1.4) or 1.5 VTEC engines both offered with either manual or CVT (automatic) transmission.

=== Chile ===
All Honda Fits sold in Chile are built in Brazil, except for a few early 2004 models. Until 2007, all three Brazilian trim levels were available LX, LXL and EX, with five-speed manual or CVT automatic transmissions, but for 2008 models, the 1.5-liter 16-valve VTEC engine is no longer available, while the Brazilian LXL, with 1.35-liter 8-valve i-DSI engine, is sold as EX.

No alcohol powered engines are available in Chile.

=== Australia ===
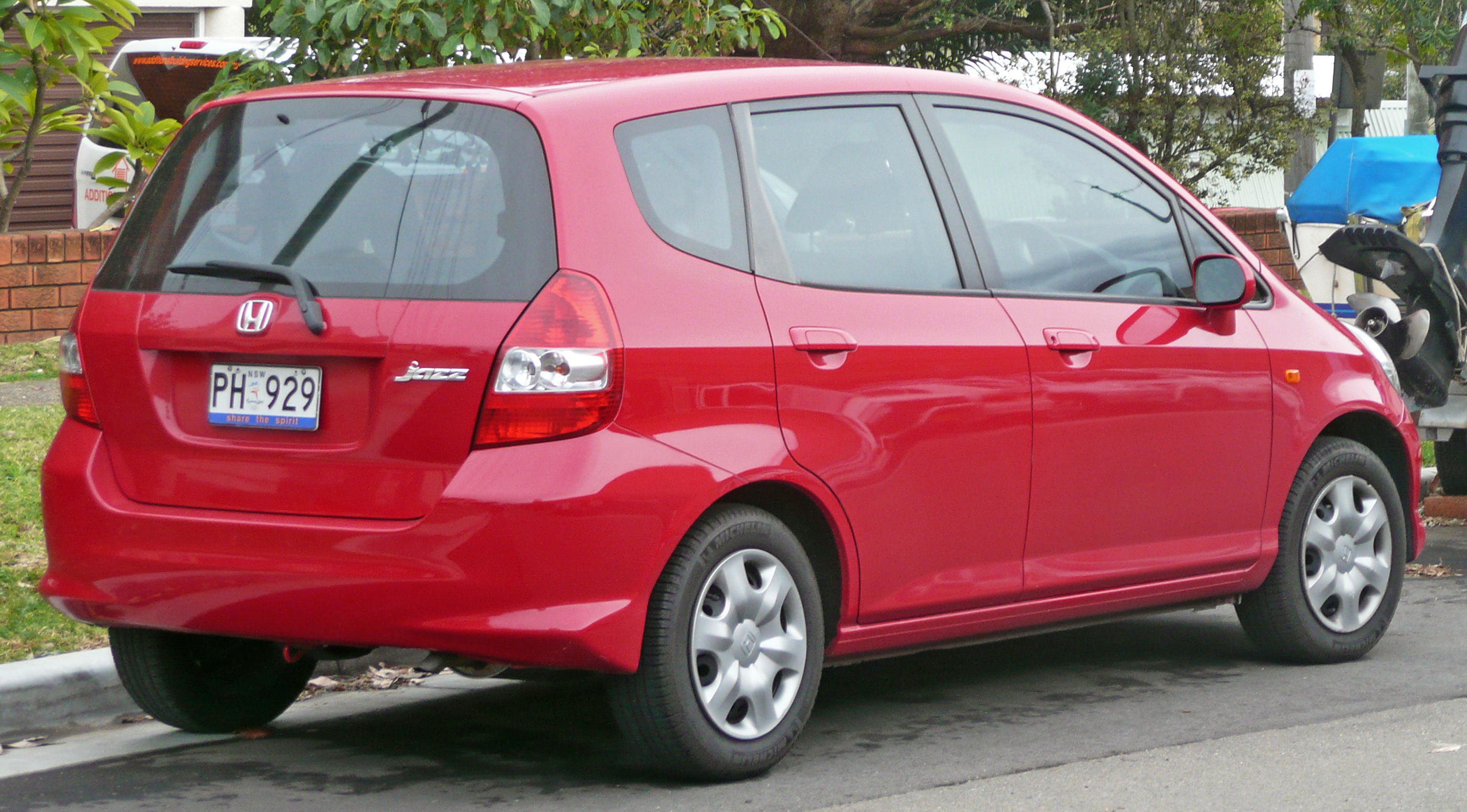
2004–2006 Honda Jazz (Australia)

The Honda Jazz offering in Australia follows, to a degree, the Japanese versions (excluding the 4WD models), and was released in Australia in October 2002.

The base model Jazz GLi is powered by a 1.34-liter i-DSI engine, and includes air-conditioning, a CD player, two front airbags, ABS brakes, EBD, a trip computer, remote central locking, a transponder coded immobilizer, power steering, windows and mirrors. Standard is a five-speed manual gearbox, with the auto CVT an optional extra.

The VTi adds the 1.5-liter VTEC engine, "sports" trim, and side mirror-mounted turning indicators. Optional is the version of the auto CVT with Formula 1 inspired gear shift paddles on the steering wheel; the VTi-S has a "sports" body kit, fog lights, and 15-inch (380 mm) alloy wheels.

A "dot" on the "J" in Jazz on the rear of the first-generation model indicates whether it is powered by a 1.5- or 1.3-liter engine. The 1.5-liter version (VTi) has a blue dot and 1.3-liter version (GLi) has a red dot. The second-generation models can be differentiated by the presence (VTi) or absence (GLi) of audio controls on the steering wheel. The body kit for the VTi-S has changed since its introduction in 2003. The picture to the right illustrates the differences. The white Jazz VTi-S in the middle is a December 2003 model, while the left silver Jazz is a 2004 VTi with optional bodykit, the right silver Jazz is a 2004 model VTi-S.

Since its introduction to Australia, the Jazz has been imported from Japan. However, in late 2005, Honda Australia began importing the Jazz from Thailand. The cheaper production costs allowed Honda to make significant price cuts across the Jazz range, though the color range has been reduced to six (compared to twelve in Japan).

In 2006, the Australian Honda Jazz received a minor cosmetic facelift. At this stage, a free trade agreement between Australia and Thailand resulted all Australian Honda Jazz models being made in the Thailand factory. The model and trim variants remained the same, excluding the cosmetic changes.

All Jazz models were upgraded to LED tail lights as standard and also the 1.3 L GLi Jazz models have its antenna mounted at the front just above the front windscreen.

The VTi 1.5 L engine and body remained the same with the addition of a sports collapsible antenna mounting on the rear roof. The CVT paddle shift system was altered for easier use. The paddle system is down gears on the left and up gears on the right. The previous model had a shifter for both up down at the three-o'clock and nine-o'clock positions.

The VTi-S is mechanically similar to the VTi, but has a sports body kit. In addition, the LED tail lights are smoked, giving a more 'sporty' look.

=== Malaysia ===
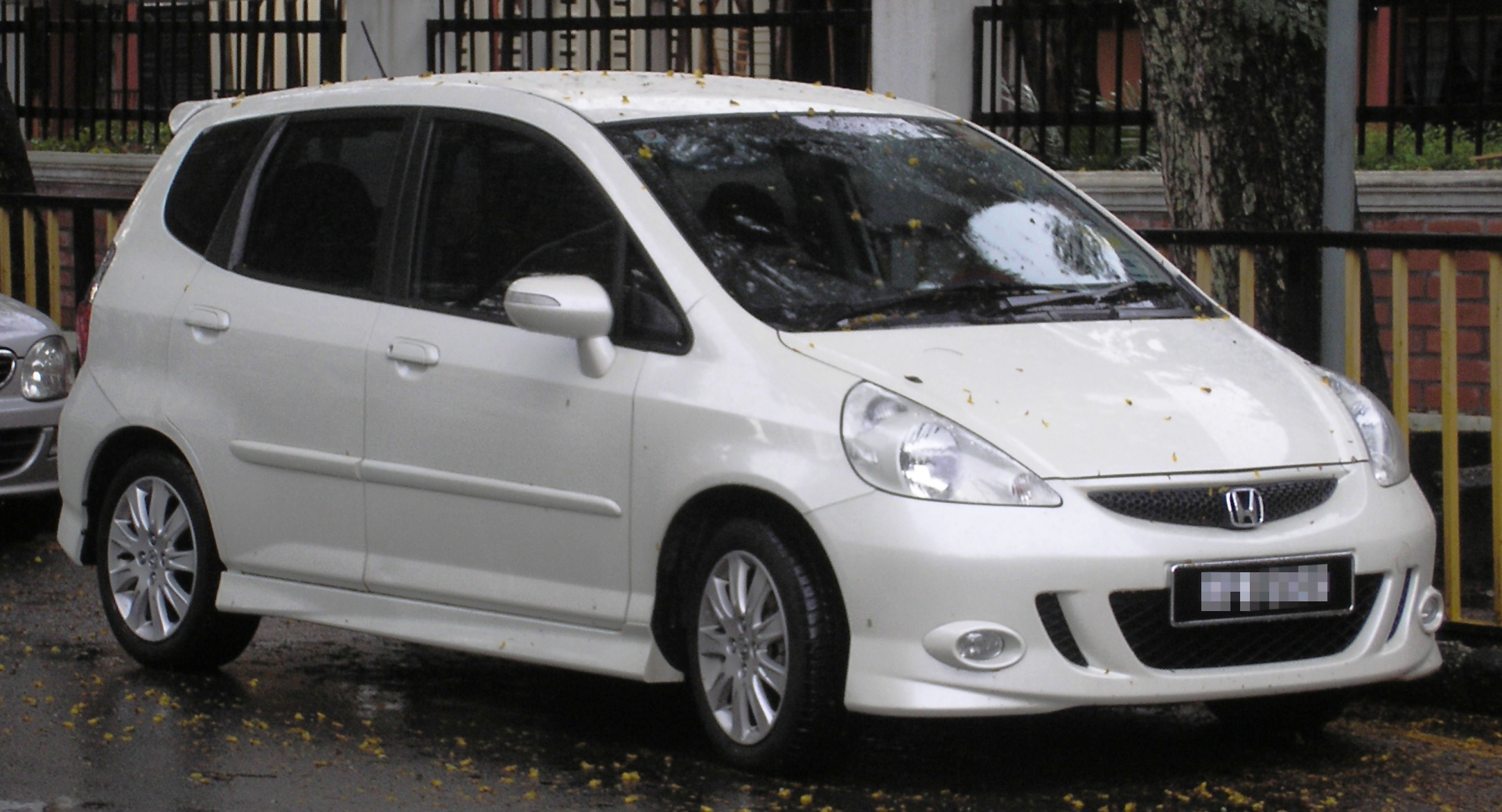

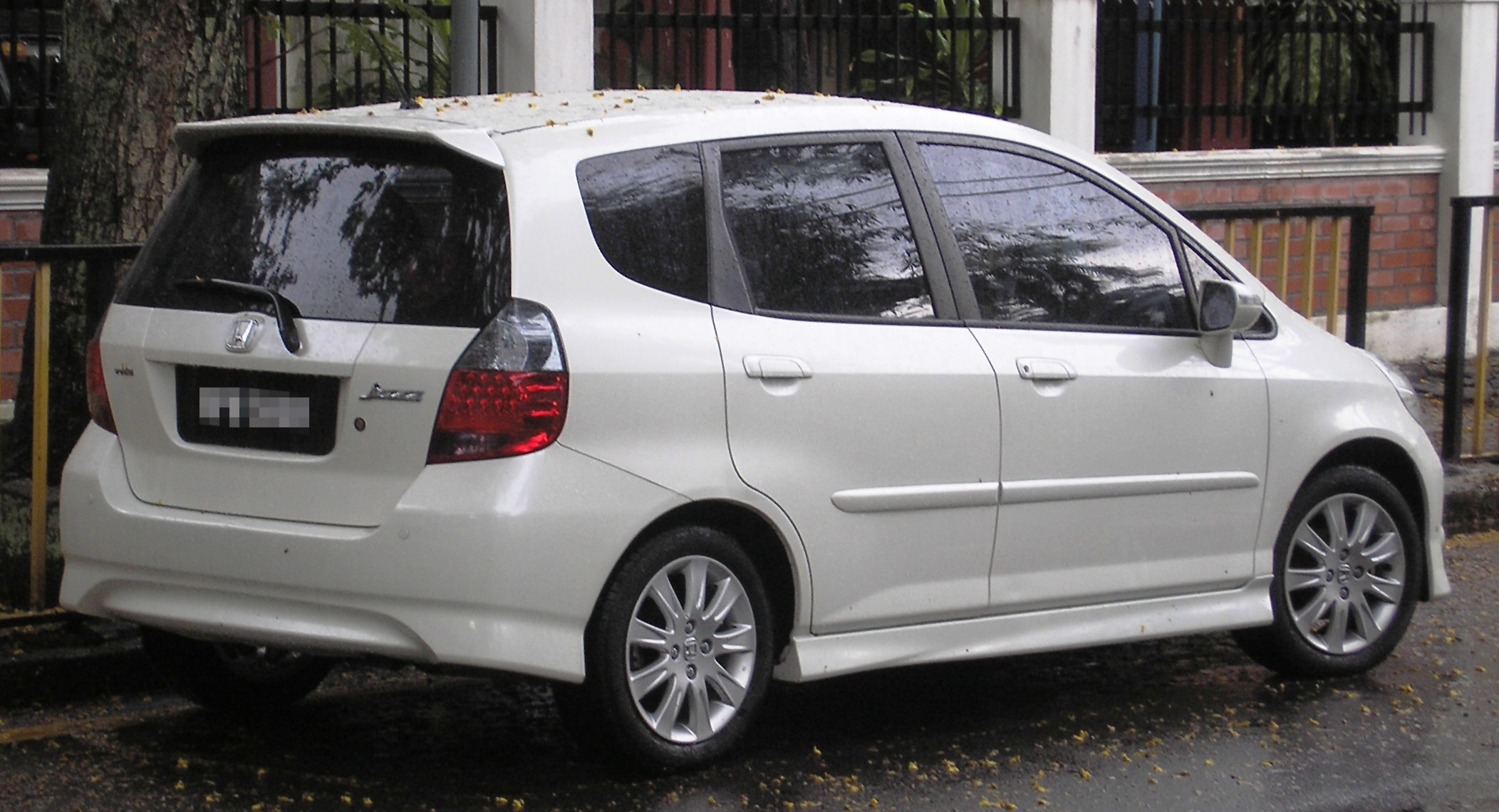
Post-2006 facelift Honda Jazz in Malaysia.

The Malaysian version was available in two variants, the 1.5 i-DSI and 1.5 VTEC. Both are equipped with CVT-7 and are front wheel drive. No manual transmission is offered. Unlike the Australian market, which had different trims for the Jazz e.g., (GLi (base model with 1.3 motor), VTi (1.5 VTEC motor without body kit) and VTi-S (Sports model with body kit), the Malaysian Jazz models were either the 1.3 iDSi or the 1.5 VTEC. As of March 2003, a sole 1.4 i-DSi model was the only variant available.

Standard equipment on both models includes air-conditioning, driver and front passenger air-bags, CD/radio head unit, ABS brakes, EBD, trip computer, central locking, power-assisted windows, power-assisted side mirrors, power-assisted steering, reflector halogen headlights, and folding seats. Optional extras can be purchased from Honda Dealers/Service Centers all around Malaysia at retail price. A three-year warranty is standard for all Jazz models purchased from authorized Honda dealers in Malaysia.

Initially, the Jazz was sold as an imported model from Japan, with the sole variant powered by a 1.3 i-DSI engine. Variants included the 1.3 i-DSi and the 1.5 VTEC model. In 2004, the 1.5 i-DSi models were imported from Thailand and 1.5 i-VTEC models were imported from Japan. Subsequently, Malaysia received units built in Thailand. The main and most noticeable difference were rear disc brakes. Japanese models incorporated rear drum brakes.

In early 2006, the Jazz underwent a facelift (introduced earlier in Japan). The new version included new front fascia and bumpers, new rear bumper, new side skirts, side-mirror-mounted indicators/turn signals, rear LED brake lights, rear LED third brake light, body-colored housing headlights and minor interior changes. The motor remained unchanged.

=== Singapore ===
The model is sold as the Jazz in Singapore by Kah Motor, Honda's authorized dealer in Singapore, and Fit by parallel importers. A 1.5 L i-DSI variant is offered for the Jazz, while the Fit sold by parallel importers is available in 1.3 L only. CVT or five-speed manual transmissions are offered from either retail channel.

=== Thailand ===
Introduced in November 2003 for local production and sold as the Jazz in Thailand. Thailand became the third production base to produce Fit, after Japan and Brazil. Initially it was available only with a 1.5 L i-DSI engine, which it shared with City (Fit Aria), and either a five-speed manual transmission or CVT. It is available in two variants, the 1.5 i-DSI and 1.5 VTEC. Both of them have front-engine, front-wheel-drive layout with CVT-7 or five-speed manual transmission offered.

=== Indonesia ===
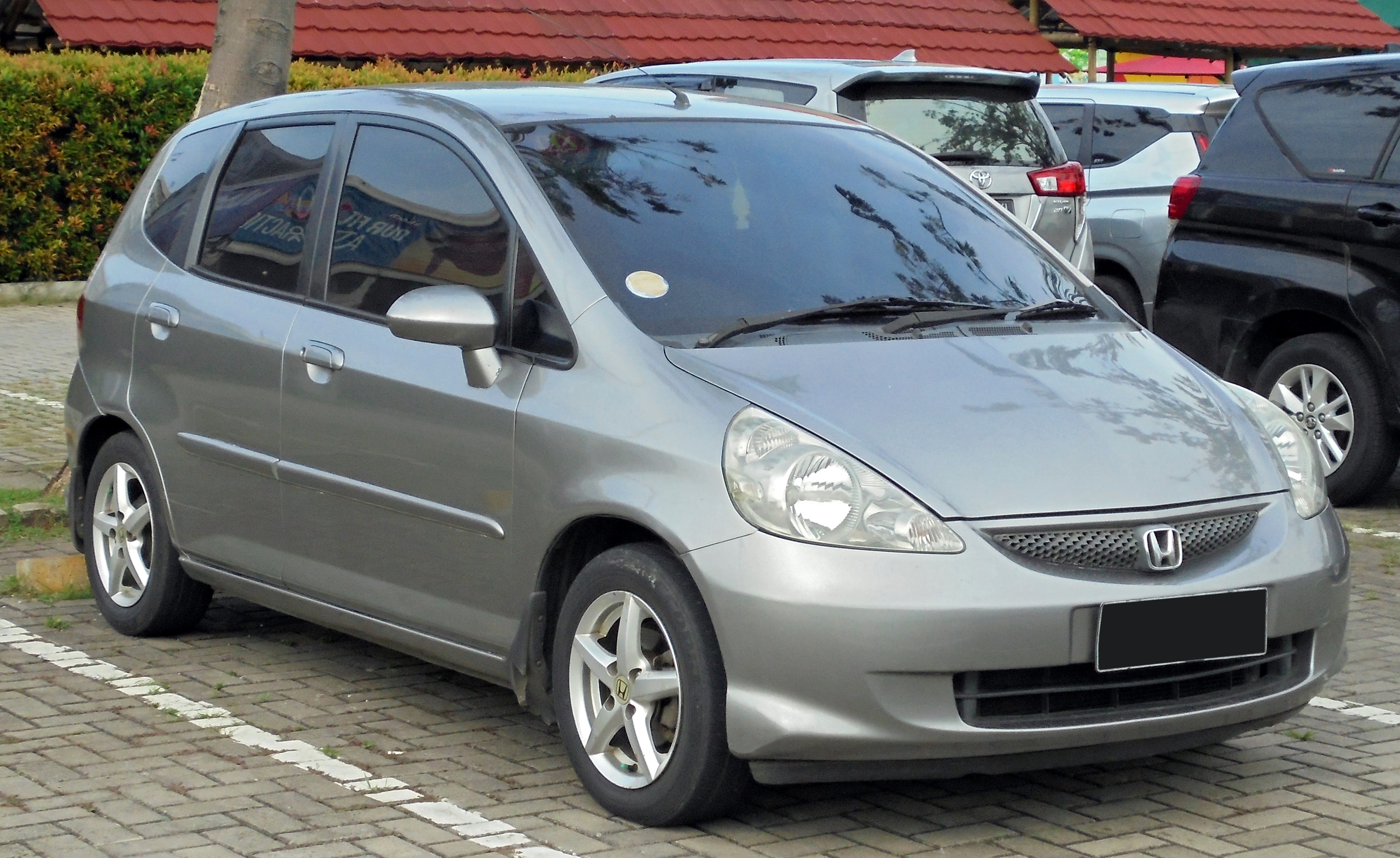
Facelifted Honda Jazz i-DSI (Indonesia)

The Jazz was first imported from Japan under the name Fit in 2002 through grey import channels. In late 2003, Honda Prospect Motor decided to import the Jazz from Thailand. The Thai-imported Jazz was then launched in Indonesia on 19 February 2004. Overwhelming demand caused Honda Prospect Motor to assemble Jazz locally at Karawang plant in 2004, while still selling the imported Jazz i-DSI alongside the local one. The Honda Jazz was an instant success and became the fourth best-selling car in Indonesia. It was initially offered in only one trim with the 1.5 i-DSI engine mated to either a 5-speed manual or a CVT transmission. In early 2005, a VTEC model was offered with added rear disc brakes, ABS, EBD and airbags. The Jazz received its facelift in 2006.

=== Philippines ===
In the Philippines, the first-generation model was sold under the Jazz name from 2004 up to 2008. It is available with three trim lines:

- 1.3 A - five-speed manual, power steering only, without airbag
- 1.3 S - five-speed manual/CVT, all-power, optional ABS, dual SRS airbag
- 1.5 V - five-speed manual/CVT (2005), all-power, ABS, dual SRS airbag

and 2 engine configurations:

- L13A i-DSI 1,339 cc SOHC 8-valve
- L15A VTEC 1,496 cc SOHC 16-valve

2004 models were imported from Thailand, while 2005–08 models were built in Honda's plant in Laguna.

== Safety ==
2007 Honda Fit NHTSA crash scores:

- Frontal Driver:
- Frontal Passenger:
- Side Driver:
- Side Rear Passenger:
- Rollover:

Euro NCAP test of a 2004 Honda Jazz 1.4 SE (RHD) model:

- Awarded stars

Honda Jazz became the supermini to have the best overall performance for combined safety in its class.

ANCAP test results Honda Jazz VTi 5 door hatch (2003)
Test	Score
Overall	4 /5 stars
Frontal offset	9.95/16
Side impact	15.69/16
Pole	Not Assessed
Seat belt reminders	0/3
Whiplash protection	Not Assessed
Pedestrian protection	Marginal
Electronic stability control	Not Assessed
