= Honda BR-V =

Subcompact crossover SUV

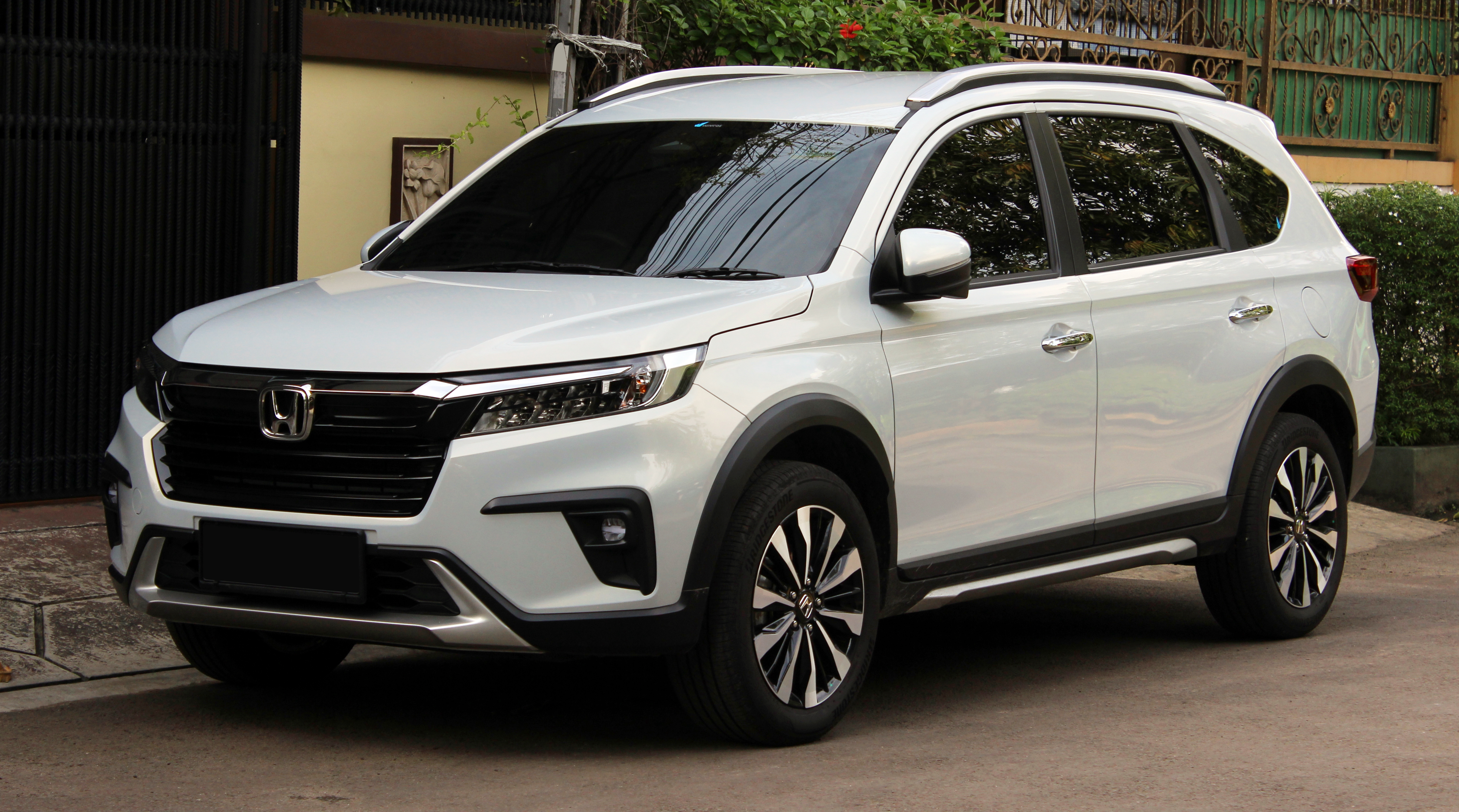
- 2022 Honda BR-V Prestige with Honda Sensing (DG3, Indonesia)

Overview
- Manufacturer: Honda
- Production: 2016–present

Body and chassis
- Class: Subcompact crossover SUV
- Body style: 5-door SUV
- Layout: Front-engine, front-wheel-drive

Chronology
- Predecessor: Honda Mobilio (DG1/2)

The Honda BR-V is a subcompact crossover SUV manufactured by Honda since 2016 and mainly sold for emerging markets. While being dimensionally bigger, the BR-V is positioned below the more advanced international market HR-V. The first-generation model shares its platform with the second-generation Mobilio, which itself is based on the lengthened Brio platform. The second-generation model is built on a separate platform from the Mobilio (shared with the second-generation Amaze and the WR-V instead).

Developed by Honda R&D Asia Pacific in Thailand, the BR-V has been manufactured and assembled in several Asian countries, including Indonesia, Thailand, the Philippines, Malaysia, India, and Pakistan, and is also sold in Brunei, Mexico, and South Africa.

According to Honda, the name "BR-V" stands for "Bold Roundabout Vehicle".

== First generation (DG1/2; 2016) ==
First generation
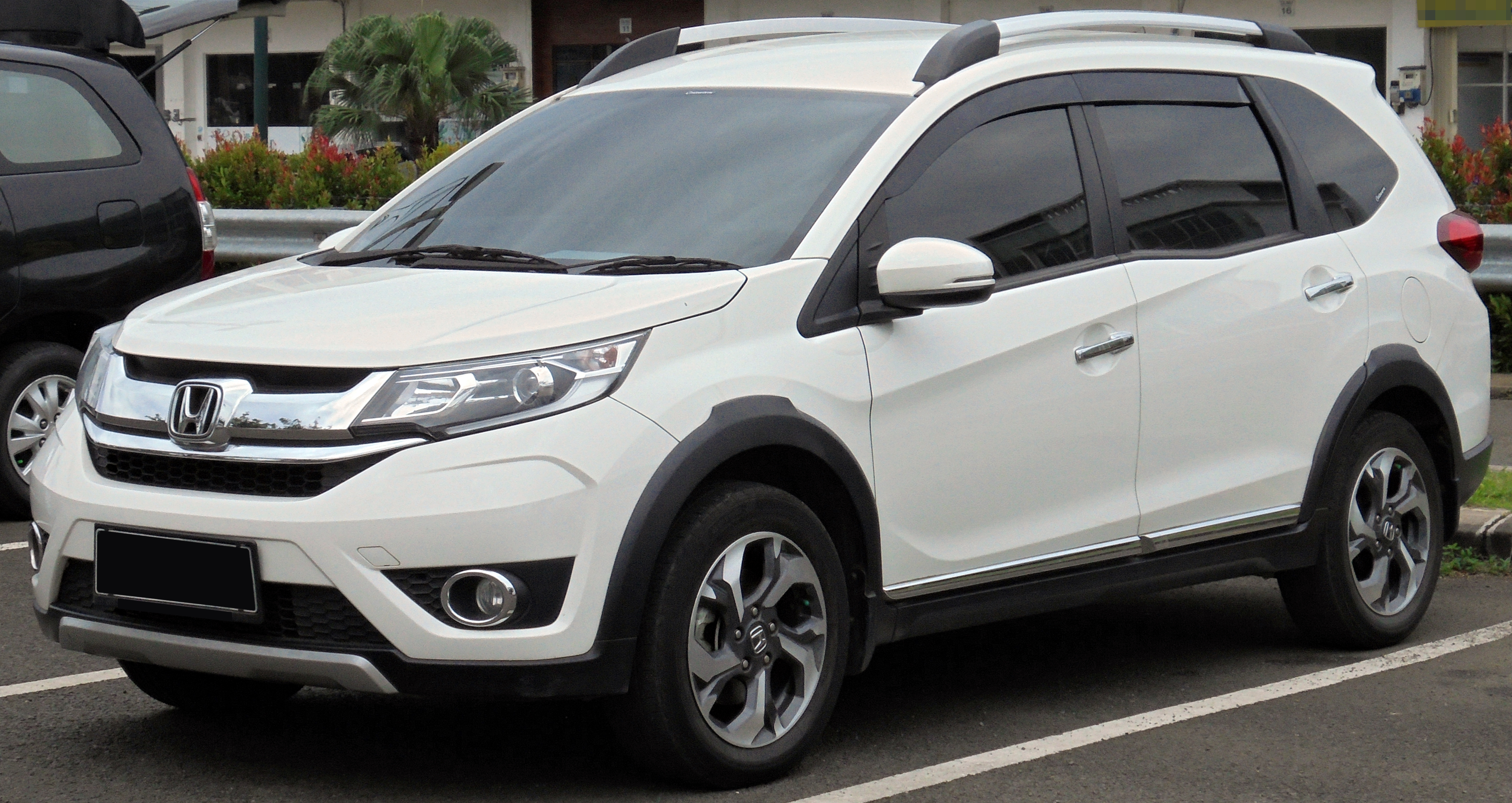
- 2017 BR-V E (DG1; pre-facelift, Indonesia)

Overview
- Model code: DG1/2
- Production: January 2016 – 2021; 2017–2026 (Pakistan)
- Assembly: Indonesia: Karawang (HPM); Thailand: Ayutthaya (Honda Ayutthaya Plant); Philippines: Santa Rosa, Laguna; Malaysia: Pegoh, Melaka; India: Tapukara, Rajasthan (HCIL); Pakistan: Lahore (Honda Atlas)
- Designer: Yuki Ishii and Keisuke Asai

Body and chassis
- Platform: Honda Global Small Car
- Related: Honda Mobilio (second generation); Honda Brio; Honda Amaze (first generation)

Powertrain
- Engine: Petrol: 1.5 L L15Z1 SOHC i-VTEC I4 (DG1); Diesel: 1.5 L N15A1 i-DTEC I4-T (DG2)
- Power output: 88 kW (118 hp; 120 PS) (petrol); 73.5 kW (99 hp; 100 PS) (diesel)
- Transmission: 6-speed manual; CVT

Dimensions
- Wheelbase: 2,662 mm (104.8 in)
- Length: 4,453–4,456 mm (175.3–175.4 in)
- Width: 1,735 mm (68.3 in)
- Height: 1,666 mm (65.6 in)
- Curb weight: 1,206–1,222 kg (2,659–2,694 lb)

On 20 August 2015, the first-generation BR-V prototype was unveiled at the 23rd Gaikindo Indonesia International Auto Show. It is the third model that was developed by Honda R&D Asia Pacific in Thailand after the Amaze and Mobilio (both also derived from the Brio).

According to Tomoki Uchida, the director of Honda Prospect Motor in Indonesia at the time, the BR-V would "serve as an answer to rising customer demands and needs for an affordable SUV that rides high, has a sleek design and is capable to load 7 passengers at one trip". As BR-V is targeted particularly for the Asian market, mass production took place at several plants with different commencement date.

=== Markets ===
==== India ====
The first-generation BR-V was launched in India in an official event in Kolkata on 5 May 2016. Four trim levels were available: E, S, V and VX. All trim levels were available with either a petrol or diesel engine paired with a manual transmission. Only the petrol-powered V trim can be had with a continuous variable transmission. It was discontinued in 2020 due to declining sales and implementation of BS6 emission standards from April 2020.

==== Indonesia ====
The first-generation BR-V went on sale in Indonesia on 23 January 2016 and is available in 3 trim levels, which are S, E, and E Prestige (renamed to Prestige in the facelifted model). The hill-start assist and vehicle stability assist are available with the CVT option.

The BR-V became Honda's second best-selling automobile model in Indonesia for 2016.

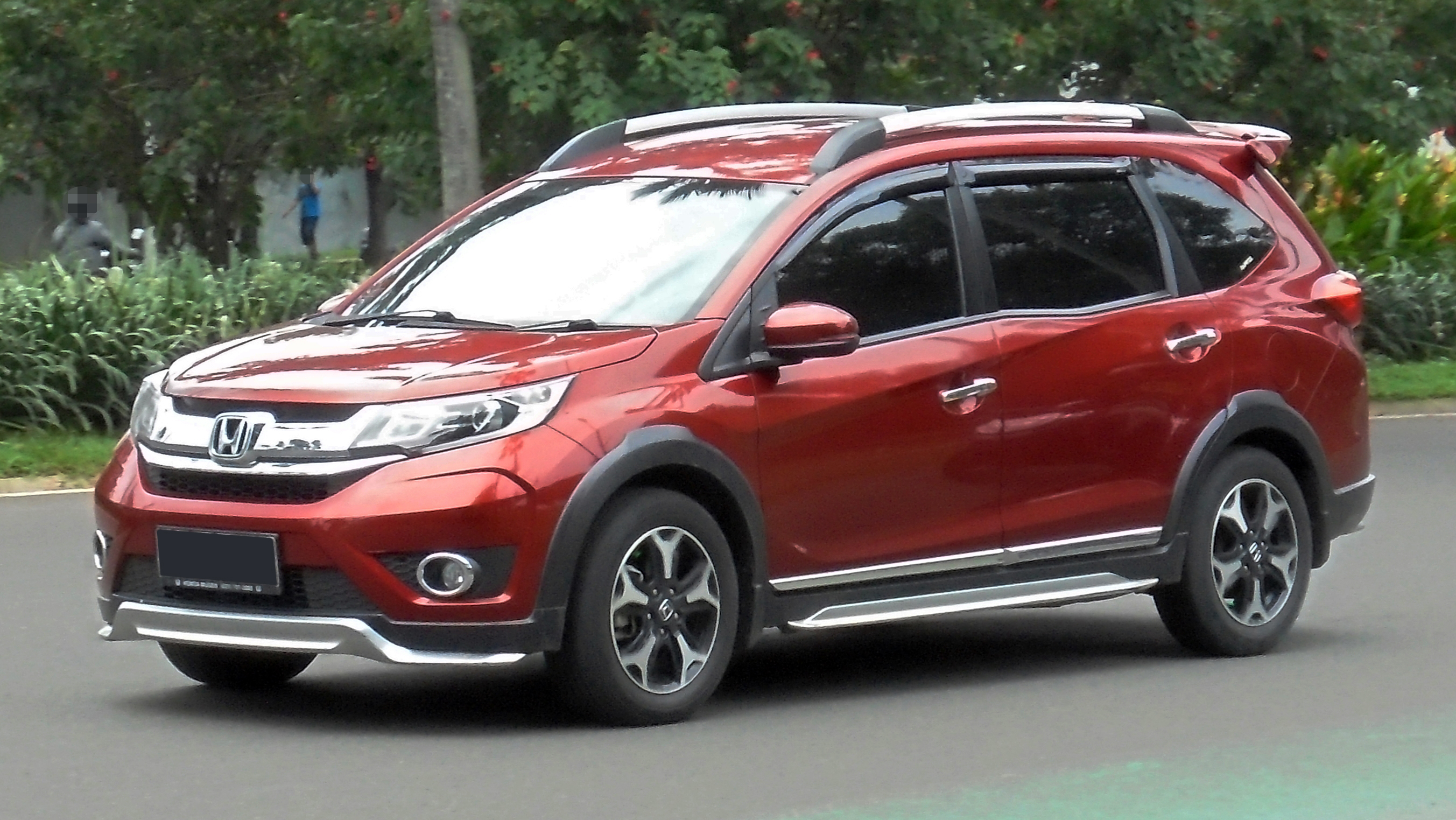
2016 BR-V E Prestige (DG1; pre-facelift, Indonesia)

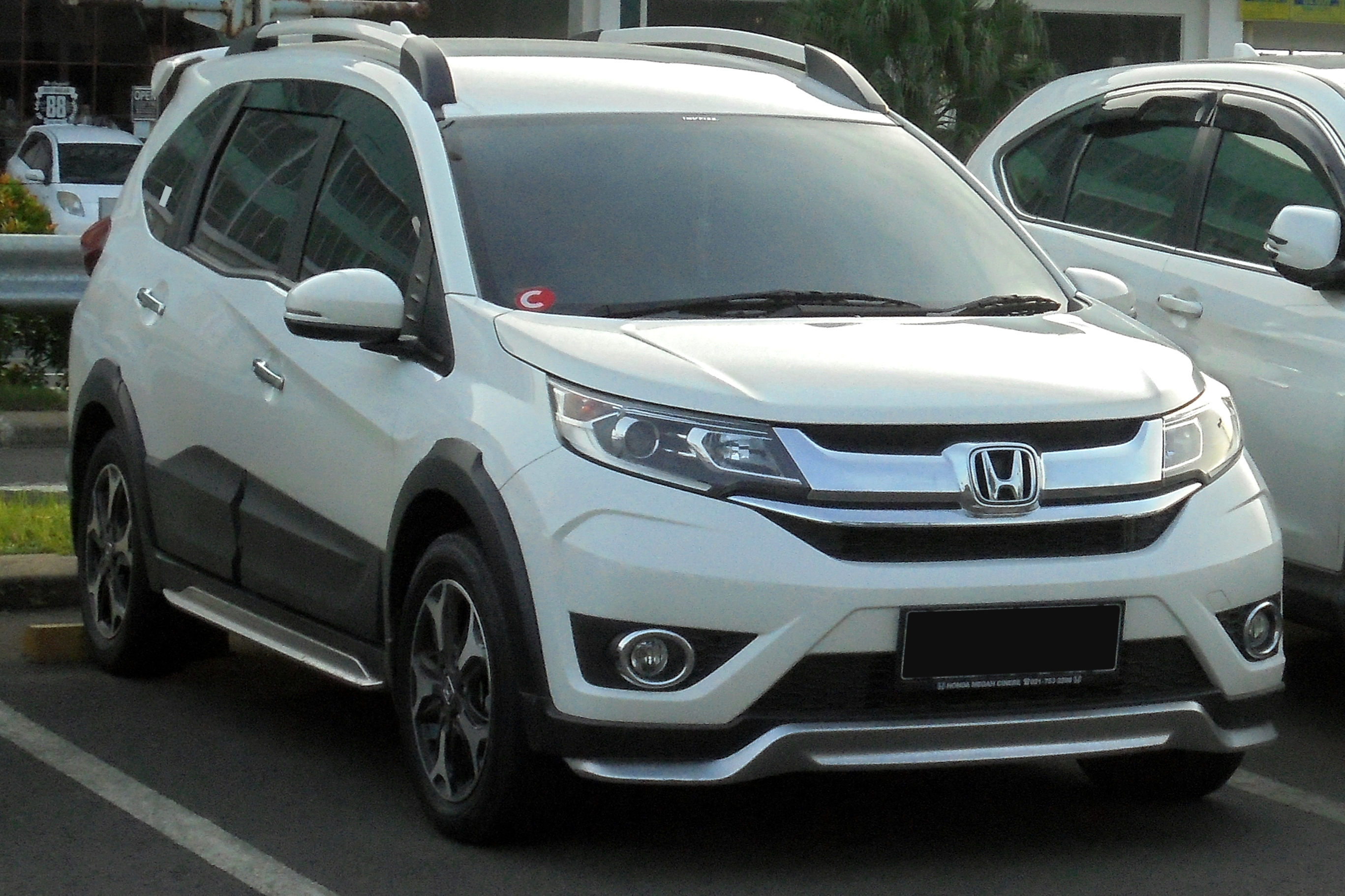
2018 BR-V E Prestige (DG1; pre-facelift, Indonesia)

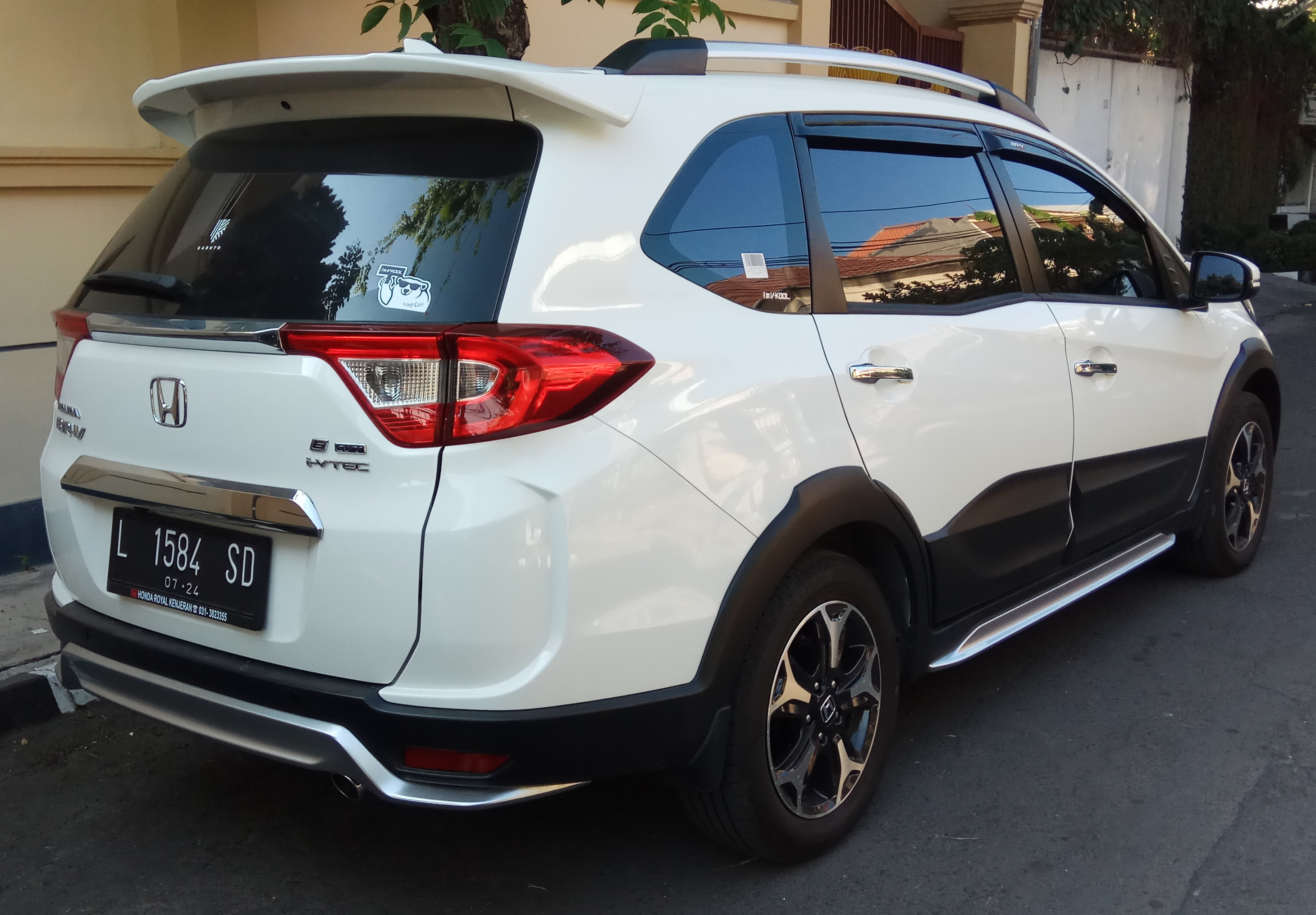
2018 BR-V E Prestige (DG1; pre-facelift, Indonesia)

==== Malaysia ====
The first-generation BR-V was launched in Malaysia on 5 January 2017. The Malaysian version comes with added NVH reduction features compared to those sold in neighboring countries. By early March 2017, bookings up to 8,500 units were received for the Honda BR-V in Malaysia, making it one of the top selling cars for Honda in Malaysia and resulting in an extended waiting time for the car. Almost 12,000 units of BR-V were sold within the first six months after launch. All variant/trim come standard with Electric Power Steering (EPS), Hill Start Assist (HSA), Anti-lock Braking System (ABS), Vehicle Stability Assist (VSA), Isofix and reverse camera with parking sensors.

In Malaysia, the BR-V is offered in E, V and SE (Special Edition) trim levels and powered by 1.5L SOHC i-VTEC engine paired with Continuous Variable Transmission (CVT).

==== Pakistan ====
The first-generation BR-V was launched in Pakistan as a locally assembled model on 21 April 2017. Initially, it came in only two trim levels: i-VTEC and i-VTEC S. Later on, a third trim level, the i-VTEC MT, was launched on 1 April 2018. i-VTEC and i-VTEC S came with CVT while i-VTEC MT came with 6-speed manual transmission. All three trim levels came with the 1.5-litre L15Z1 SOHC i-VTEC I4 petrol engine.

Honda Atlas launched the locally assembled facelifted BR-V on 12 October 2019. The facelifted vehicle comes in only two trim levels: i-VTEC MT (manual transmission) and i-VTEC CVT (automatic transmission). Both trims use the same 1.5-litre petrol engine as the pre-facelift trims. The BR-V was discontinued in Pakistan in 2026.

==== Philippines ====
The first-generation BR-V was previewed at the 2016 Philippine International Motor Show. It is available in 2 trim levels: 1.5 S CVT and 1.5 V Navi CVT.

It went on sale on 10 December 2016 at all Honda dealerships across the country.

==== South Africa ====
The first-generation BR-V was launched into the South African market in October 2016 with either manual transmission or CVT options with three trim levels. South African models received paddle shifters on the CVT models. The lineup doesn't include EBD on any models. Both daytime running lamps and reverse parking sensors are absent and neither are offered as an optional factory option.

==== Thailand ====
Initially previewed at the 2015 Thailand International Motor Expo, the first-generation BR-V was launched in Thailand on the 28 January 2016 with two variants available: V and SV. The V only came with two rows of seats allowing for a seating capacity of 5 while the SV variant came with three rows of seats allowing for a seating capacity of 7.

=== Facelift ===
The BR-V received a facelift that includes redesigned front and rear fascia. This facelift was first launched at the 27th Indonesia International Motor Show on 25 April 2019.

On 5 November 2019, for the Mexican market, this facelift entered the market just after being sold for a year.

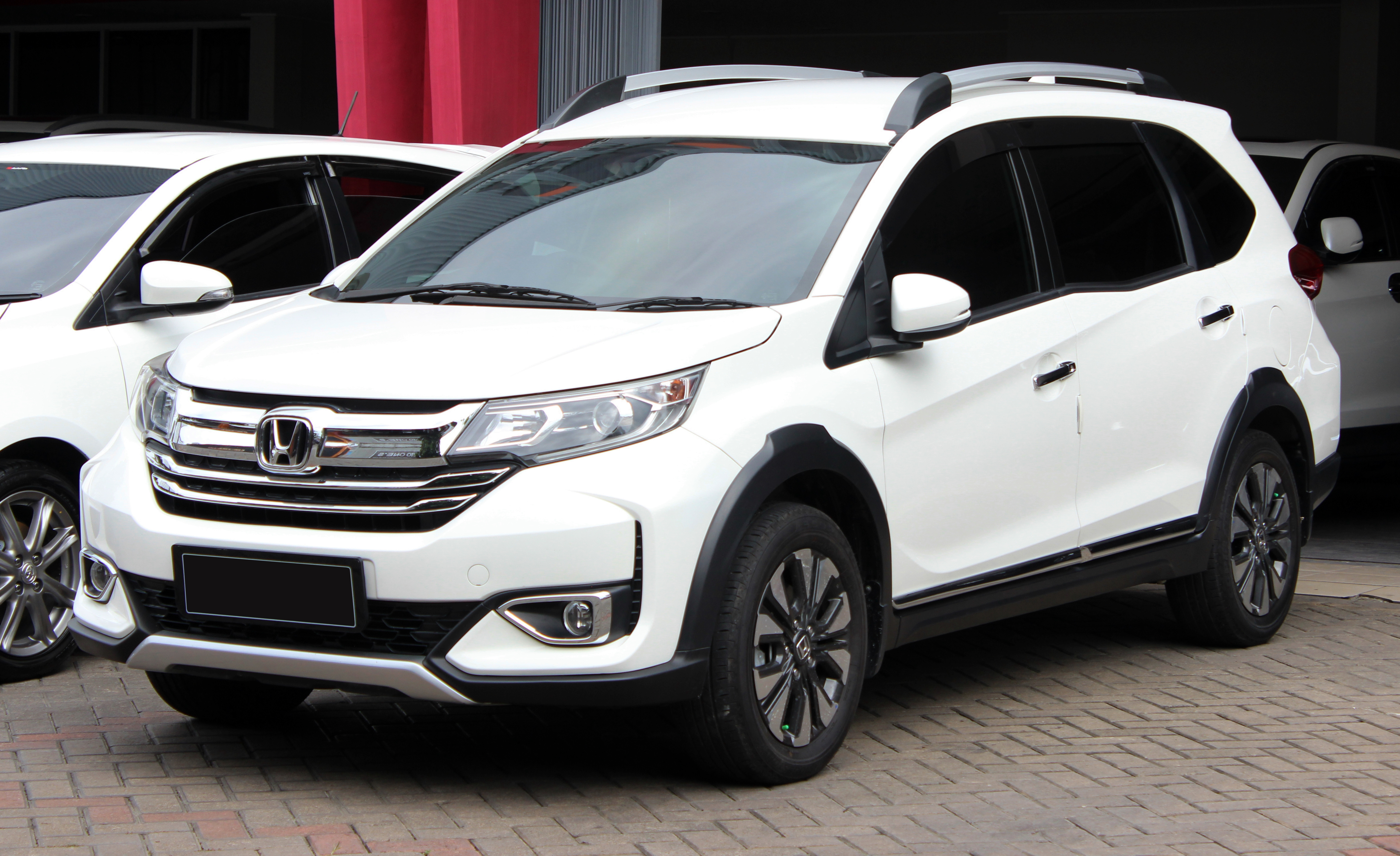
2020 BR-V E (DG1; facelift, Indonesia)

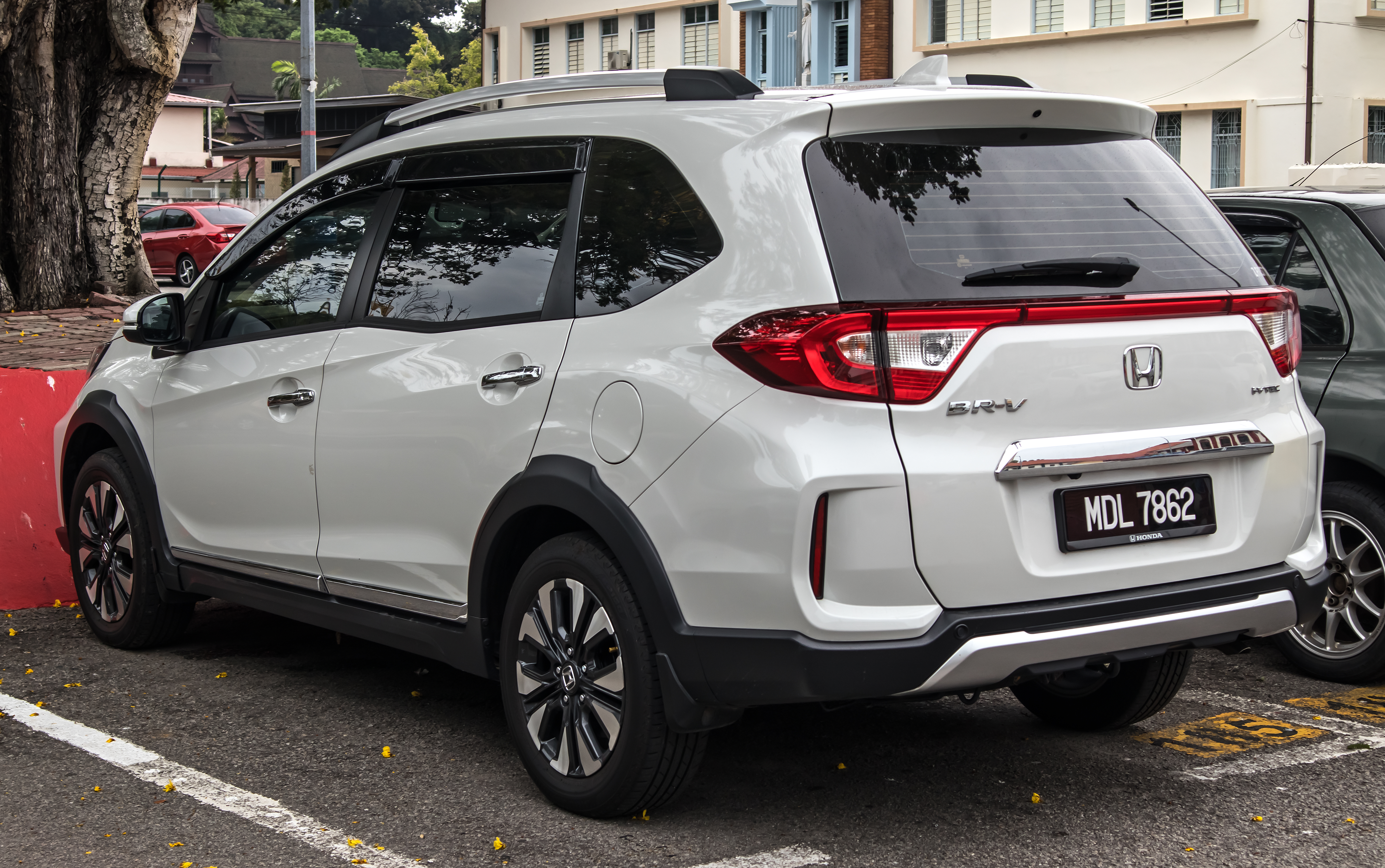
BR-V 1.5 V (DG1; facelift, Malaysia)

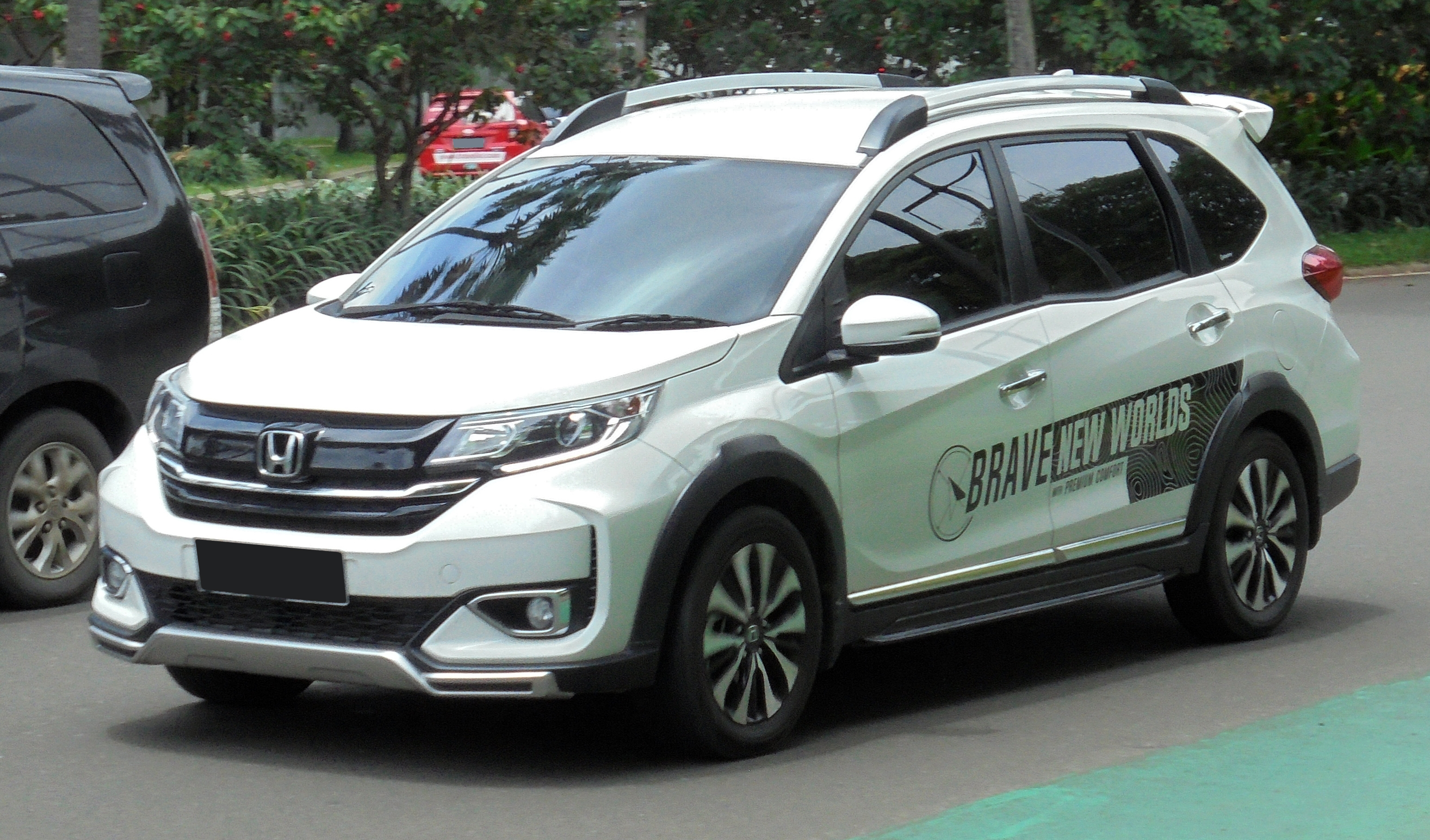
2019 BR-V Prestige (DG1; facelift, Indonesia)

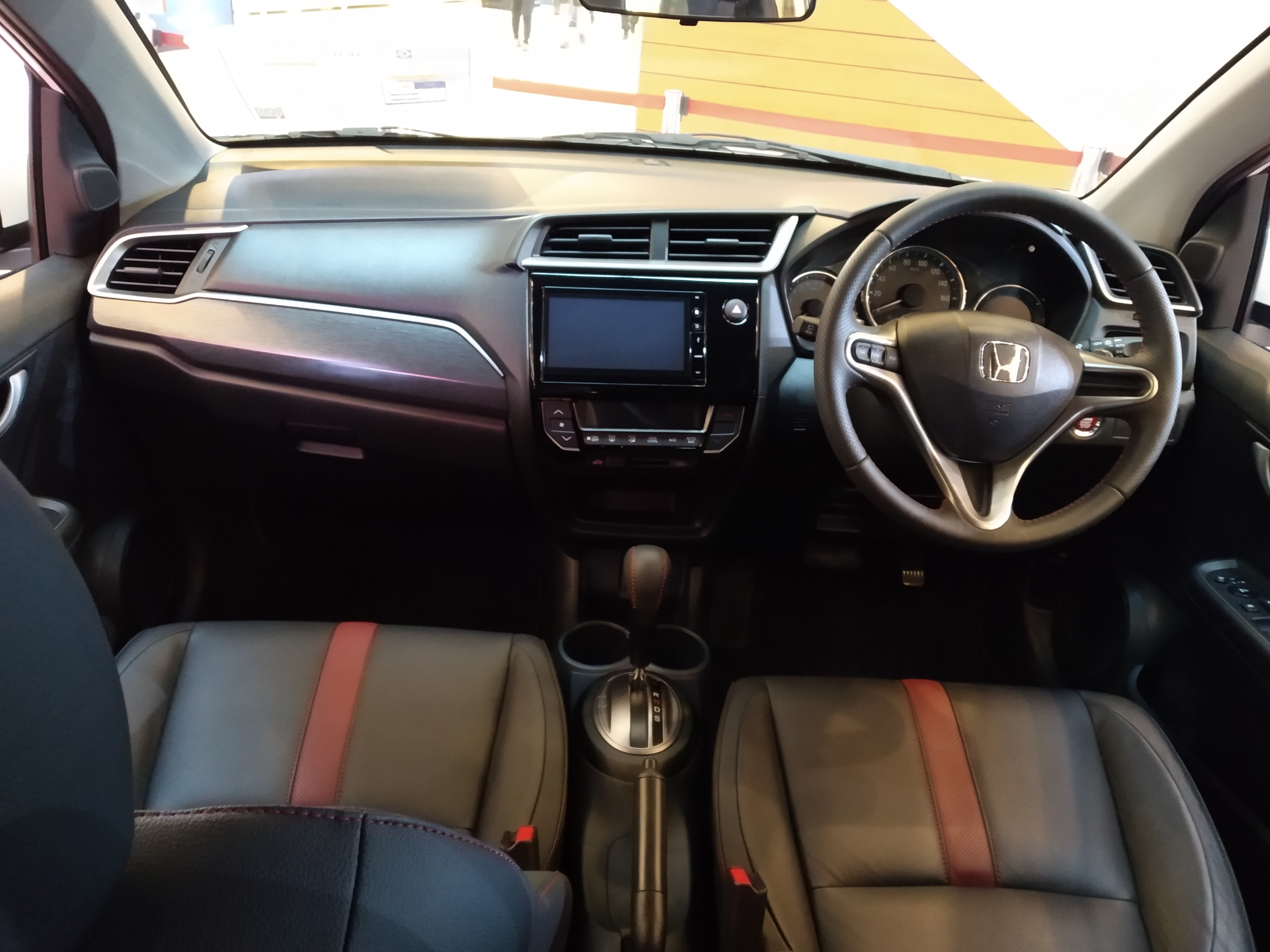
2020 BR-V 1.5 V interior (facelift, Malaysia)

=== Engines ===
The first-generation BR-V available with either a 1.5 L L15Z1 i-VTEC four-cylinder petrol engine that produces 88 kW (118 hp; 120 PS) at 6,600 rpm and 145 N⋅m (107 lb⋅ft) of torque at 4,600 rpm, or a 1.5 L N15A1 four-cylinder turbocharged diesel engine that produces 73.5 kW (99 hp; 100 PS) at 3,600 rpm and 200 N⋅m (148 lb⋅ft) of torque at 1,750 rpm.

=== Safety ===
ASEAN NCAP test results Honda BR-V (2016)
Test	Points	Stars
Adult occupant:	14.79	4 /5 stars
Child occupant:	72%	4 /5 stars
Safety assist:	NA	

ASEAN NCAP test results Honda BR-V (2016)
Test	Points	Stars
Adult occupant:	14.79	5 /5 stars
Child occupant:	72%	4 /5 stars
Safety assist:	NA	

== Second generation (DG3; 2021) ==
Second generation
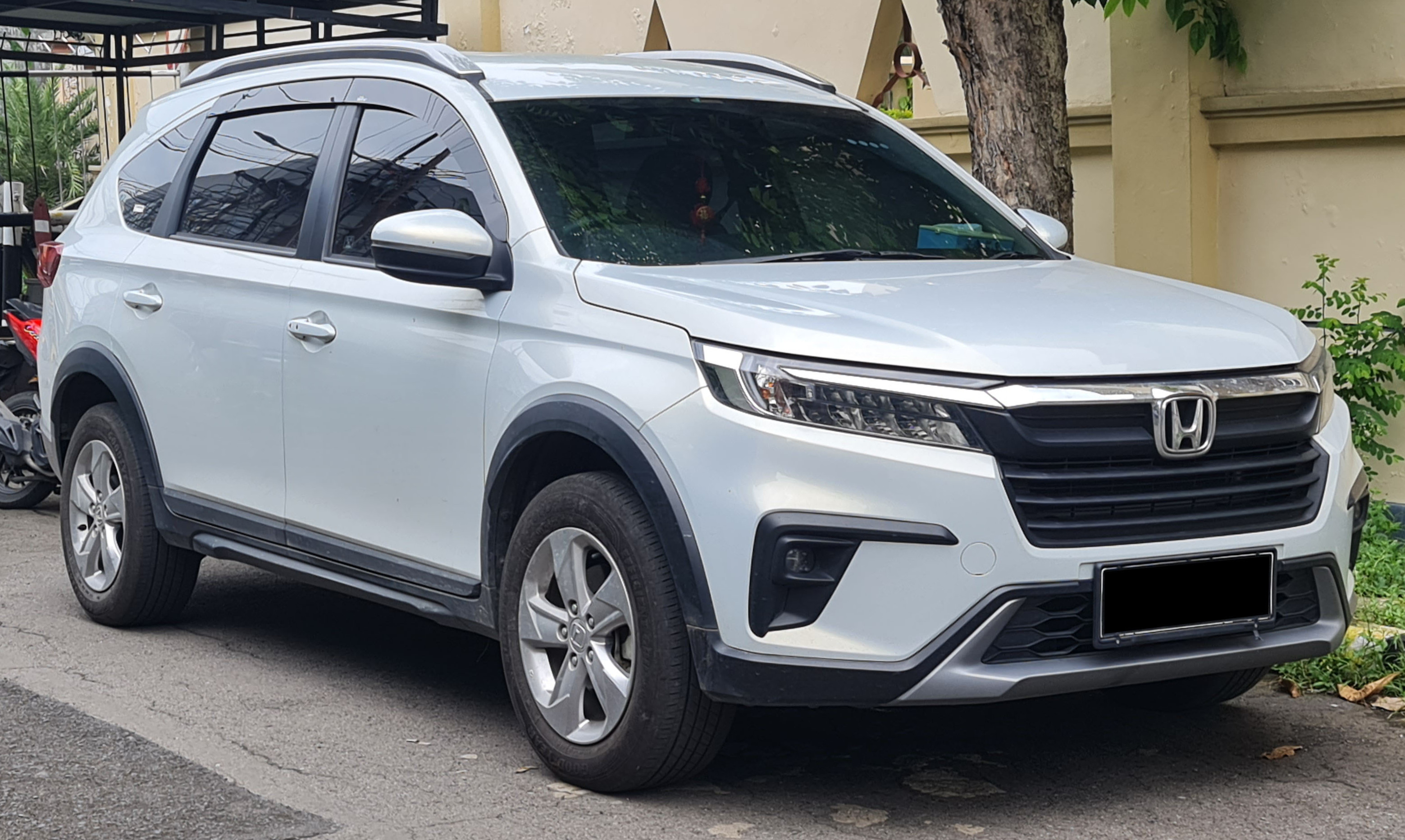
- 2022 BR-V E (DG3, Indonesia)

Overview
- Model code: DG3
- Production: December 2021 – present
- Assembly: Indonesia: Karawang (HPM)
- Designer: Eknat Ajjanakulchai and Suthai Chokngamvong

Body and chassis
- Related: Honda WR-V (second generation); Honda Amaze (second generation)

Powertrain
- Engine: Petrol: 1.5 L L15ZF DOHC i-VTEC I4 (DG3)
- Power output: 89 kW (119 hp; 121 PS)
- Transmission: 6-speed manual; CVT

Dimensions
- Wheelbase: 2,700 mm (106.3 in)
- Length: 4,490 mm (176.8 in)
- Width: 1,780 mm (70.1 in)
- Height: 1,651–1,685 mm (65.0–66.3 in)

Chronology
- Predecessor: Honda Mobilio (DD4/DD5)

The second-generation BR-V was unveiled in Indonesia on 21 September 2021. It was previewed as a near-production concept model, called the "N7X Concept", which was revealed on 3 May 2021. Development was led by Large Project Leader Parinya Tangwiengwang of Honda R&D Asia Pacific. Its design is mostly retained from the N7X Concept with minimum changes, while its dashboard design is nearly identical to the second-generation Amaze and the WR-V released later.

The second-generation BR-V uses the 1.5-litre L15ZF DOHC i-VTEC four-cylinder engine that produces 89 kW (119 hp; 121 PS) at 6,600 rpm along with the continuously variable transmission that is shared with the seventh-generation City, with slight adjustments in tuning.

The second-generation BR-V went on production in Indonesia on 13 December 2021 with a claimed localisation level of 80 percent. Indonesian sales commenced on 8 January 2022. Exports from the country also commenced on 16 March 2022 to around 30 countries throughout Africa and South America.

Unlike the first generation, the second generation BR-V will not be available in Malaysia, to be replaced by the shorter WR-V.

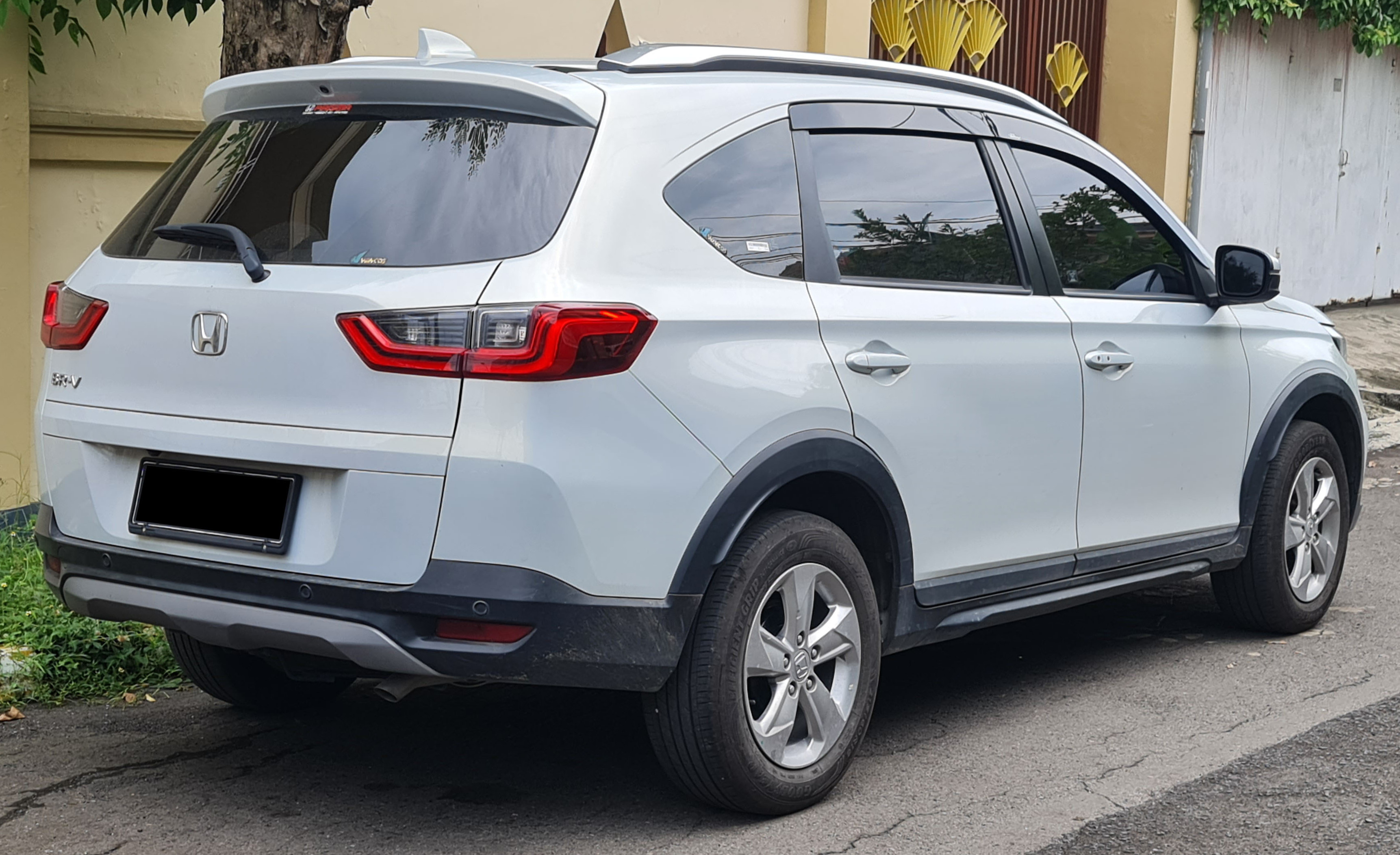
2022 BR-V E (DG3, Indonesia)

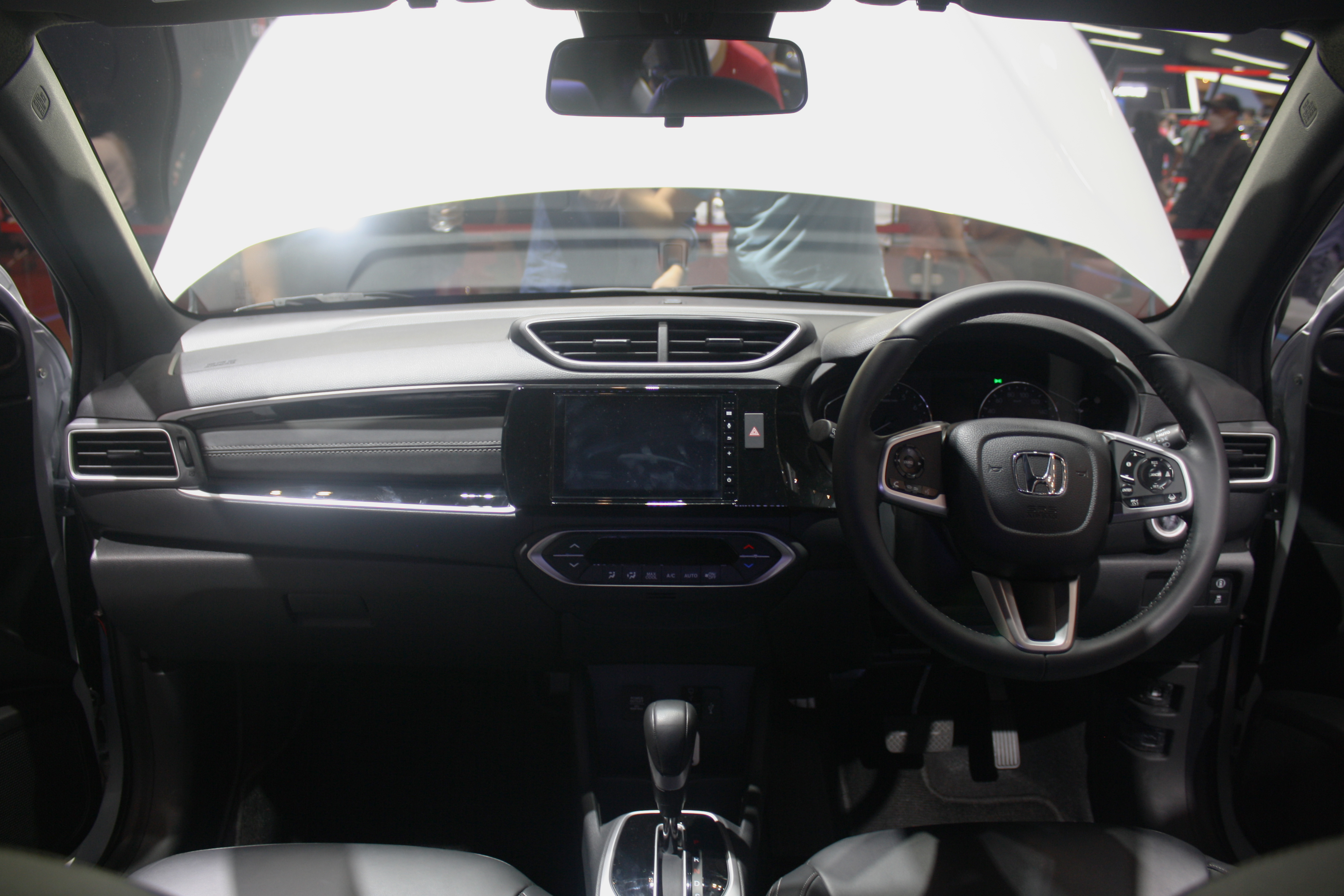
Interior

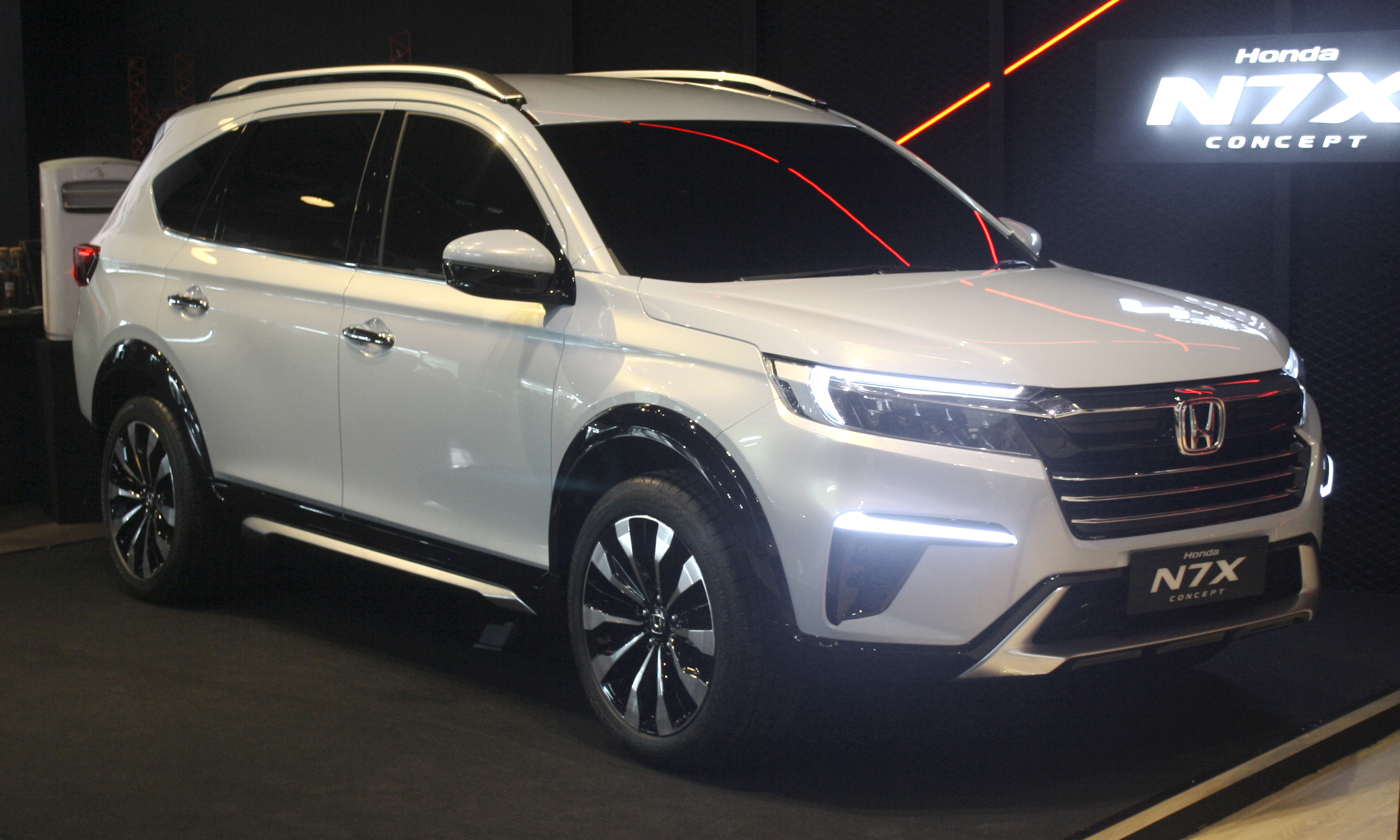
N7X Concept which previewed the second-generation BR-V

=== Markets ===
==== Indonesia ====
In Indonesia, the second-generation BR-V is offered in S, E and Prestige trim levels. Honda Sensing active safety system along with the LaneWatch camera system is available as an option for the Prestige trim.

In February 2024, the N7X Edition model was made available for the E and Prestige trims.

The N7X Edition model was updated in 2026 Indonesia International Auto Show.

==== Jamaica ====
In Jamaica, the second-generation BR-V was released along with third-generation Honda HR-V on 4 June 2022. It was offered in LX and EX-L Prestige trim levels, both standard with a CVT transmission. Honda Sensing is standard on the latter trim.

==== Thailand ====
In Thailand, the second-generation BR-V was announced on 27 July 2022. Imported from Indonesia, it is offered in E and EL trim levels. Honda Sensing is standard in both trim levels.

==== South Africa ====
The second-generation BR-V was released in South Africa on 8 September 2022, it offered three trim levels: Trend (manual only), Comfort (manual and CVT9), and Elegance (CVT9 only). Honda Sensing is standard on the Elegance trim. It was discontinued alongside the Ballade in November 2025 due to declining sales.

==== Philippines ====
The second-generation BR-V was released in the Philippines on 21 November 2022. It is offered in three trim levels; S (manual and CVT), V (CVT only) and the top-grade VX (CVT only), all with the 1.5-litre VTEC engine. Honda Sensing is standard for the VX trim.

==== Vietnam ====
The second-generation BR-V was released in Vietnam on 4 July 2023, alongside the facelifted City. It is offered in G and L trim levels, all with the 1.5-litre VTEC engine. Honda Sensing is standard in both trim levels.

==== Mexico ====
The second-generation BR-V was released in Mexico on 8 August 2023, it offered in Uniq and Touring trim levels, all standard with a CVT transmission. Honda Sensing is standard on the latter trim.

=== Safety ===
ASEAN NCAP test results Honda BR-V (2022)
Test	Points
Overall:	5 /5 stars
Adult occupant:	33.72
Child occupant:	17.46
Safety assist:	15.71
Motorcyclist Safety:	10.13

== Sales ==
Year	Indonesia	Thailand	Malaysia (Note: Figures based on registration (Malaysia))	Philippines	South Africa	India	Pakistan	Mexico
2016	38,666	10,153		704	561	16,820		
2017	21,932	6,087	17,506	7,212	1,614	12,275	10,318	
2018	9,143	5,143	11,389	4,719	1,609	7,140	16,019	
2019	4,071	4,540	7,538	4,003	1,383	2,857		6,153
2020	1,468	3,032	3,624	2,041	697	60		3,759
2021	2,949	1,589	3,886	1,989	742			3,819
2022	26,677	1,045	2,646		248			3,508
2023	18,195	813	0	6,882	678			3,846
2024	9,156	360						5,381
2025	4,214	18						
