= Honda Brio =

City car produced by Honda

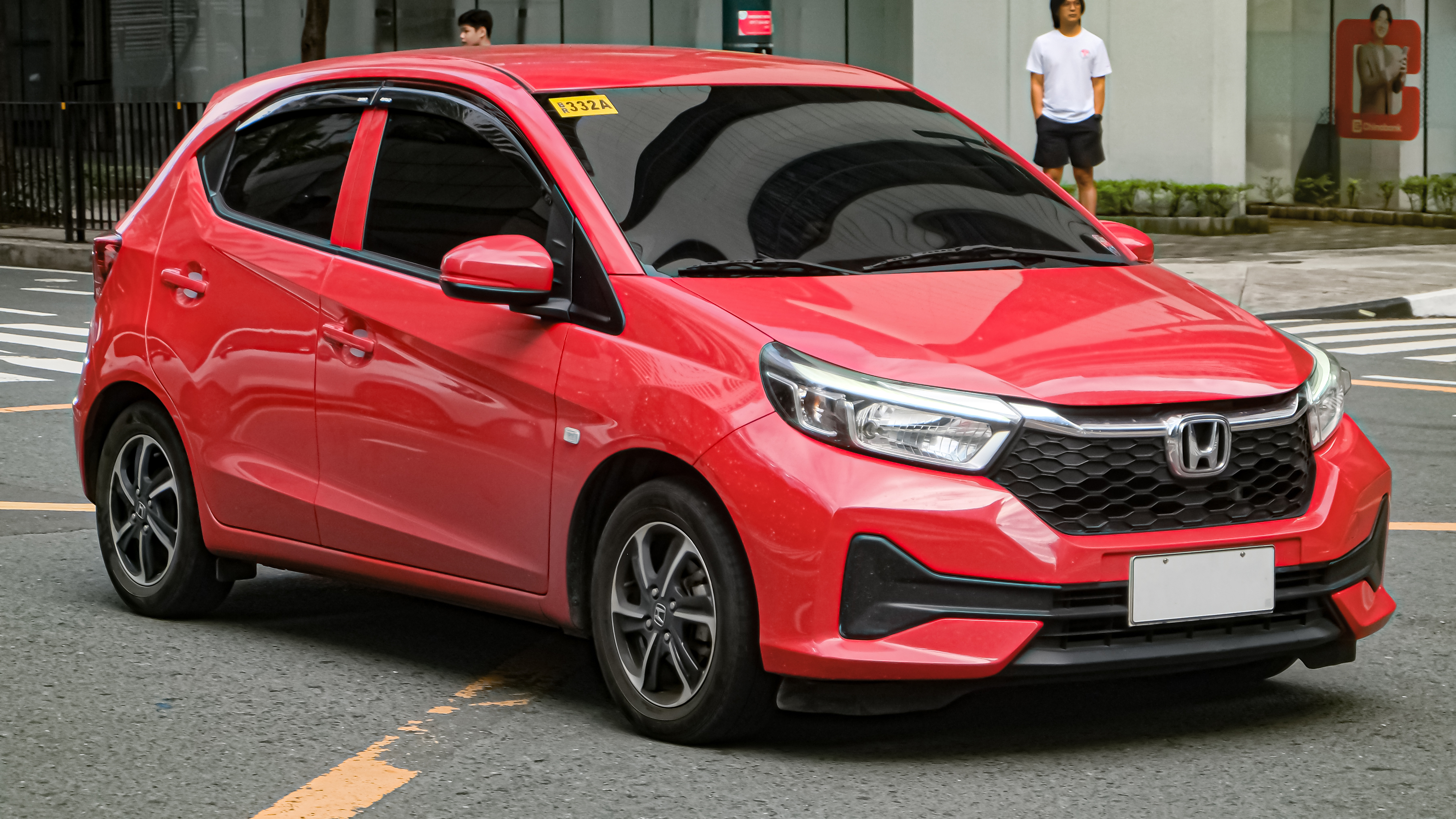
- 2024 Honda Brio (DD1, Philippines)

Overview
- Manufacturer: Honda
- Production: March 2011 – present

Body and chassis
- Class: City car
- Body style: 5-door hatchback
- Layout: Front-engine, front-wheel-drive
- Platform: Honda Global Small Car

The Honda Brio is a city car produced by Honda since 2011. It is mainly sold in Southeast Asia and also in other regions, positioned as an entry-level hatchback model slotted below the Fit/Jazz and the City. Along with the complementary Amaze sedan, it is the second smallest car in Honda's global line-up as of 2026, after the Super-One electric car.

The name Brio is Italian for 'vivacity' or 'verve'. In August 2013 in Indonesia, several entry-level Brio variants received an additional Indonesia-inspired name to comply with the country's Low Cost Green Car (LCGC) program. The name Satya (Sanskrit: 'true', 'genuine', 'sincere' or 'faithful') is used as the suffix.

== First generation (DD1/2; 2011) ==
First generation
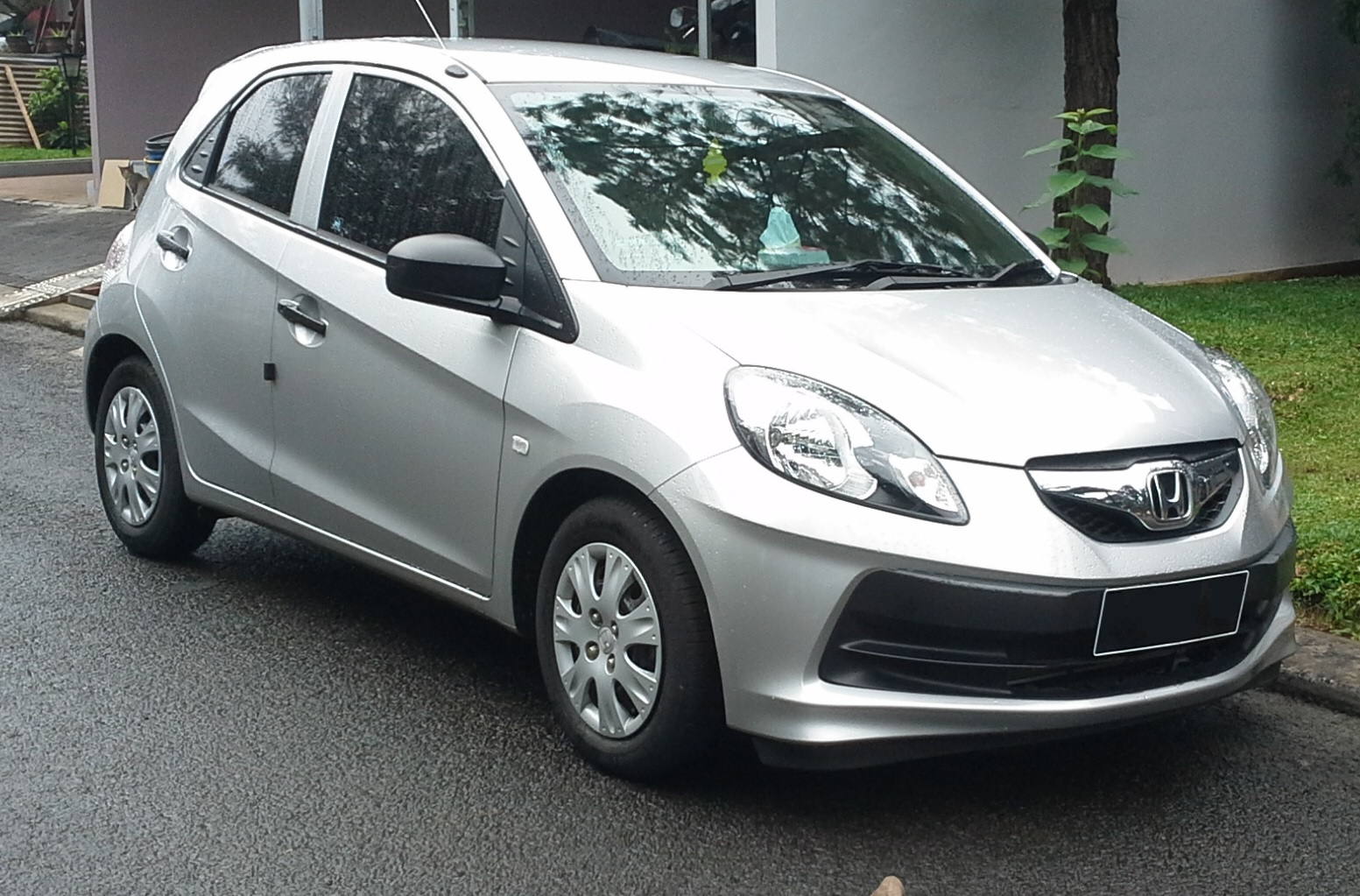
- 2013 Brio S (DD2; pre-facelift, Indonesia)

Overview
- Model code: DD1/2
- Production: March 2011 – April 2020 (Thailand); September 2011 – November 2018 (India); August 2013 – July 2018 (Indonesia)
- Assembly: Thailand: Ayutthaya; India: Greater Noida (HCIL); Indonesia: Karawang (HPM)
- Designer: Akihiko Ohhashi, Keisuke Nakamura and Takeshi Aoki

Body and chassis
- Related: Honda Amaze (first generation); Honda Mobilio; Honda BR-V (first generation)

Powertrain
- Engine: Petrol: 1.2 L L12B3 i-VTEC I4 (DD1); 1.3 L L13Z1 i-VTEC I4 (DD2)
- Power output: 65–66 kW (87–89 hp; 88–90 PS) (L12B3); 73.5 kW (99 hp; 100 PS) (L13Z1)
- Transmission: 5-speed manual; 5-speed automatic; CVT

Dimensions
- Wheelbase: 2,345 mm (92.3 in)
- Length: 3,610 mm (142.1 in)
- Width: 1,680 mm (66.1 in)
- Height: 1,470–1,500 mm (57.9–59.1 in)
- Kerb weight: 910–990 kg (2,006–2,183 lb)

Honda launched the Brio in 2011 as a hatchback slotted in a class below the Fit/Jazz. The car was specifically designed for emerging markets such as Thailand and India, two countries where the Brio was initially manufactured. The car was previewed as the New Small Concept. The concept car was first shown at the 2010 Thailand International Motor Expo.

=== Powertrain ===
The first-generation Brio is powered by either a 1.2-litre L12B3 SOHC i-VTEC four-cylinder petrol engine producing 65–66 kW (87–89 hp; 88–90 PS) at 6,000 rpm and 108–110 N⋅m (80–81 lb⋅ft) of torque at 4,500–4,800 rpm, or a 1.3-litre L13Z1 SOHC i-VTEC four-cylinder petrol engine producing 73.5 kW (99 hp; 100 PS) at 6,000 rpm and 127 N⋅m (94 lb⋅ft) of torque at 4,800 rpm. It is available with either a 5-speed manual, 5-speed torque converter automatic or a continuously variable transmission (CVT). The car is certified to deliver a combined mileage of 19.4 km/L (5 L/100 km; 46 mpg_{‑US}; 55 mpg_{‑imp}) and 16.5 km/L (6 L/100 km; 39 mpg_{‑US}; 47 mpg_{‑imp}) with manual and automatic transmission respectively on the Indian cycle. For the Thai market, the 1.2-litre engine is compatible with E20 fuel.

=== Markets ===
==== Thailand ====
In Thailand, the Brio was launched on 17 March 2011 as a response to a government-endorsed Eco Car program. It was initially available in S grade with manual transmission and V grade with either manual transmission or CVT. Both S and V versions are powered by a 1.2-litre L12B3 engine that can utilise E20 fuel, and offers a claimed fuel economy of 20 km/L (56 mpg_{‑imp}). However, Honda Thailand also produced the Brio with a 1.3-litre L13Z1 engine for export markets. After the car was facelifted in May 2016, which included updated front fascia, taillights, and dashboard design, the manual transmission option was discontinued, leaving only the V grade with CVT.

At the launch, Honda expected to sell 40,000 Brios annually in the Thai market. However, throughout its lifecycle Honda only managed to sell less than around 32,000 Brio hatchbacks in the country.

==== India ====
The Brio's planned launch in India was delayed in early 2011 due to the 2011 Tōhoku earthquake and tsunami in Japan. It was launched later in September 2011. The Indian market Brio was produced by the company's subsidiary, Honda Cars India Ltd (HCIL), at its production facilities in Greater Noida. Over 80% of its parts were sourced from Indian suppliers. The Rajasthan factory also exports Brio parts to Thailand. The Brio in India were offered in V, VX and VX BL grades. The facelifted model was launched on 4 October 2016.

The Brio stopped production in India in November 2018 and removed from the lineup in February 2019 due to slow sales, leaving the Amaze as Honda's entry-level offering for the Indian market.

==== Indonesia ====
The Brio was launched in Indonesia on 2 August 2012. Initially CBU-imported from Thailand, it was first offered in S and E grades. It used the 1.3-litre L13Z1 engine instead of the 1.2-litre L12B3 unit seen previously in the Thai and Indian market, which was initially mated to either a 5-speed manual or a 5-speed torque converter automatic transmission.

Honda Prospect Motor started the production of the 1.2-litre Brio in Indonesia in August 2013 to fulfill the local demand and to certify the Brio under a government-sponsored Low Cost Green Car (LCGC) program. The qualified variants were given the "Satya" suffix to comply with the program requirements. Only the lower grades (A, S, and E, all with manual transmission) were initially qualified as an LCGC due to price limits imposed by the government. The automatic 1.2-litre model (for S and E grades) was allegedly failed to qualify the LCGC regulations which require a fuel consumption of 20 km/L (56 mpg_{‑imp}; 47 mpg_{‑US}) under certain specific conditions, which made it liable for an extra luxury goods tax. The Thai-imported 1.3-litre model, which was renamed to "Brio Sports", remained on sale as the flagship grade until December 2013, when all models became produced locally.

The Indonesian market Brio received its facelift on 7 April 2016 at the 24th Indonesia International Motor Show. It introduced the RS grade (not part of the LCGC program) with the 1.2-litre engine which replaced Sports grade as the top-of-the-line variant. The A and S automatic grades were dropped. The CVT option replaced the torque converter automatic unit, which made the automatic model (except for RS grade) qualified under the LCGC program. Sales began on 2 June 2016.

==== Philippines ====
The Brio was launched in the Philippines at the Philippine International Motor Show in September 2014.

==== South Africa ====
The Brio was launched in South Africa in December 2012.

=== Safety ===
Safety equipment includes dual front airbags, anti-lock braking system, electronic brakeforce distribution and front pretensioner seat belts. The driver's side airbag feature multi-stage inflation. The front body is designed to absorb impact energy for better pedestrian protection. The cars's front wheels have disc brakes and the rear wheels have drum type brakes. The progressive braking prevents sudden jerks.

=== Recall ===
In May 2014, Honda issued a recall of about 32,000 Brio and Amaze cars in India due to a possible mis-assembly of the proportioning valve. This recall is limited to models which are not fitted with ABS.

=== Gallery ===
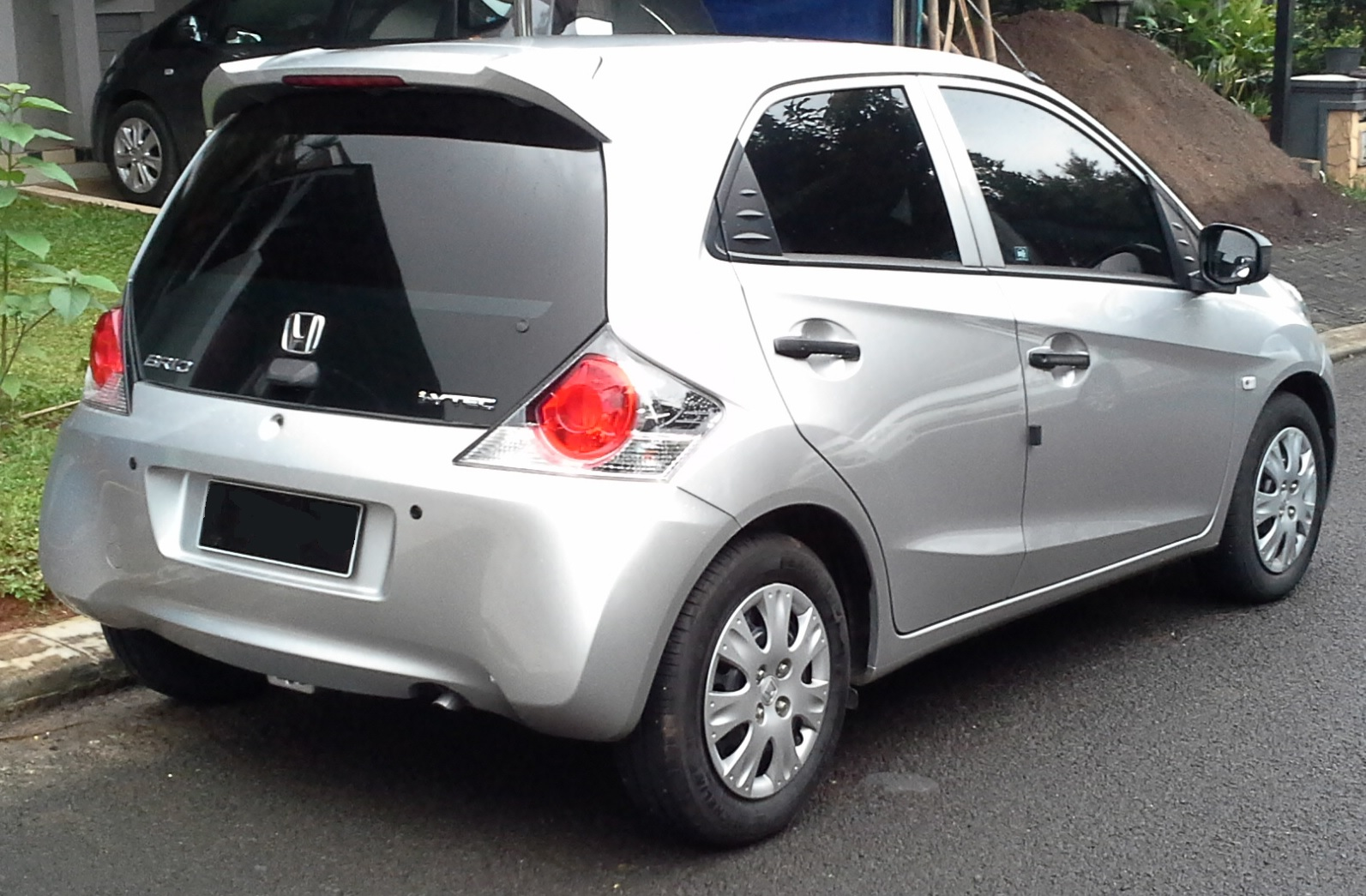
2013 Brio S (DD2; pre-facelift, Indonesia)

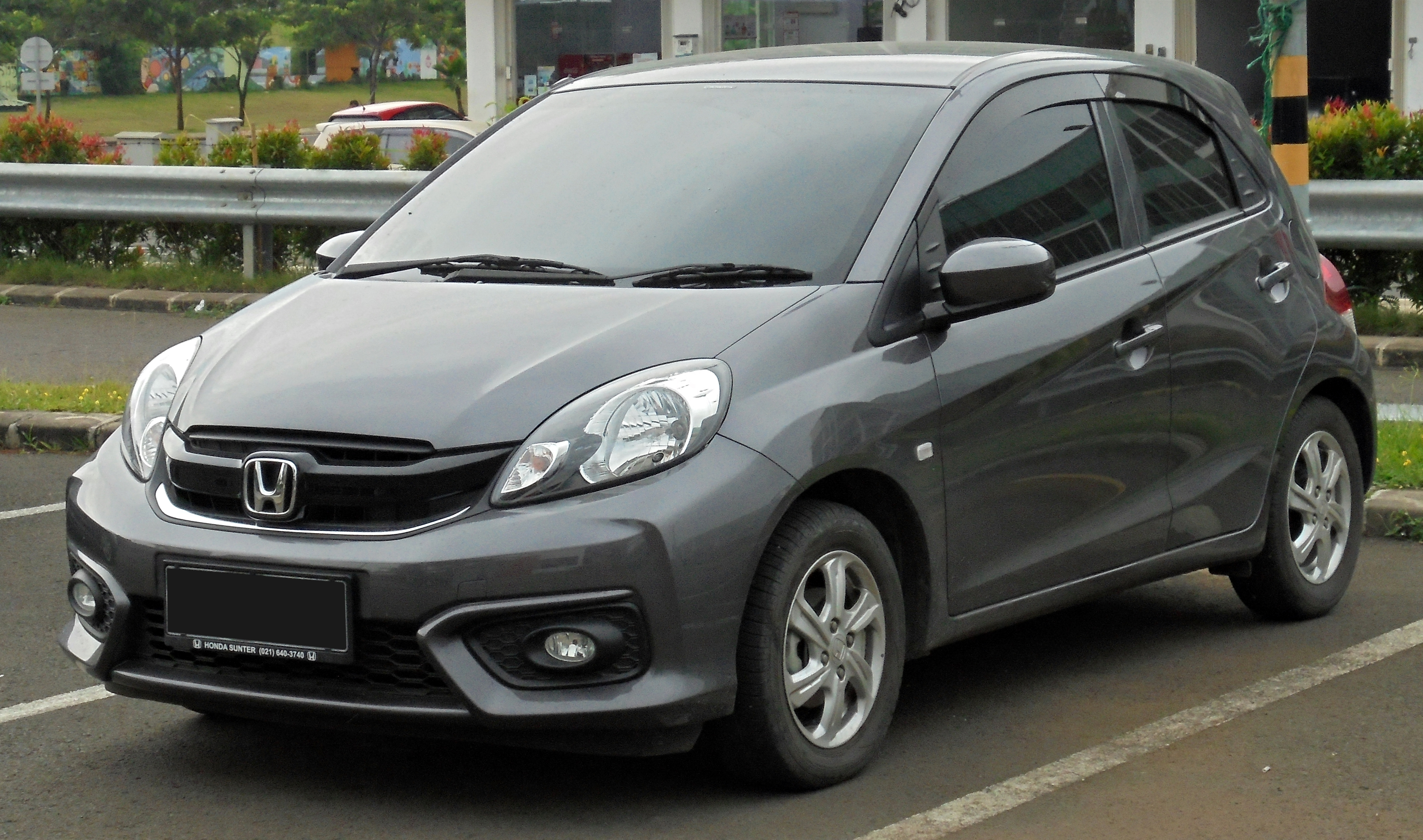
2018 Brio Satya E (DD1; facelift, Indonesia)

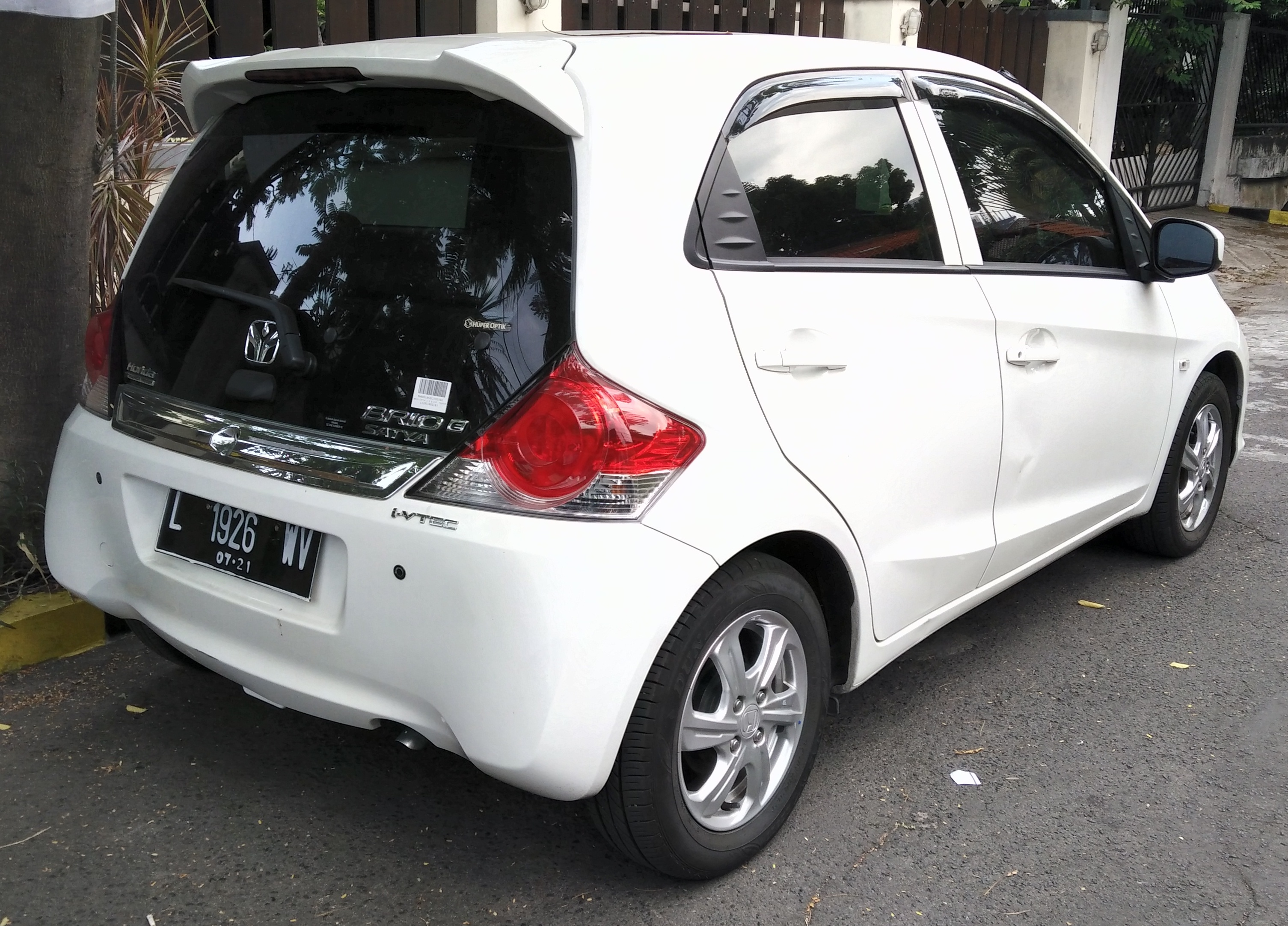
2016 Brio Satya E (DD1; facelift, Indonesia)

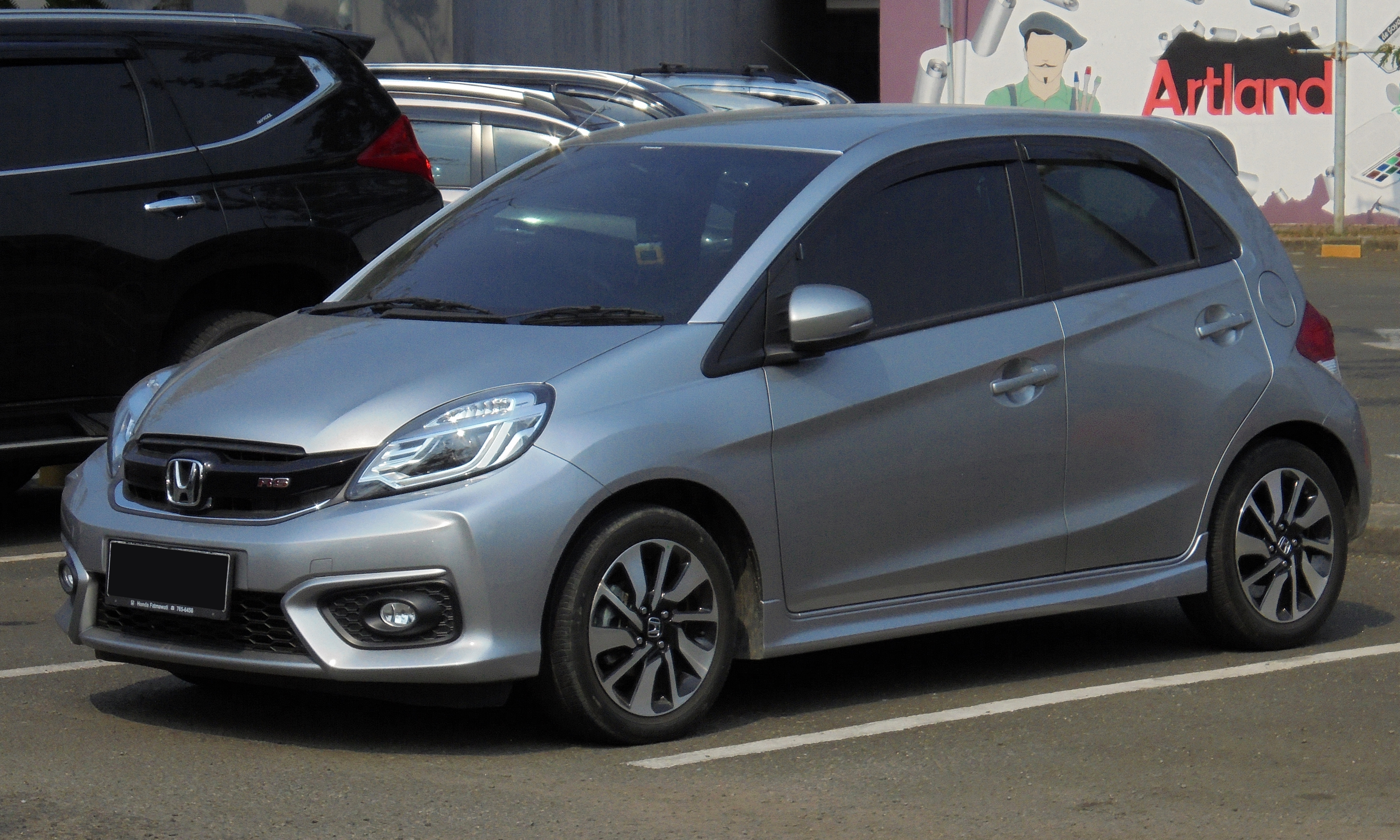
2017 Brio RS (DD1; facelift, Indonesia)

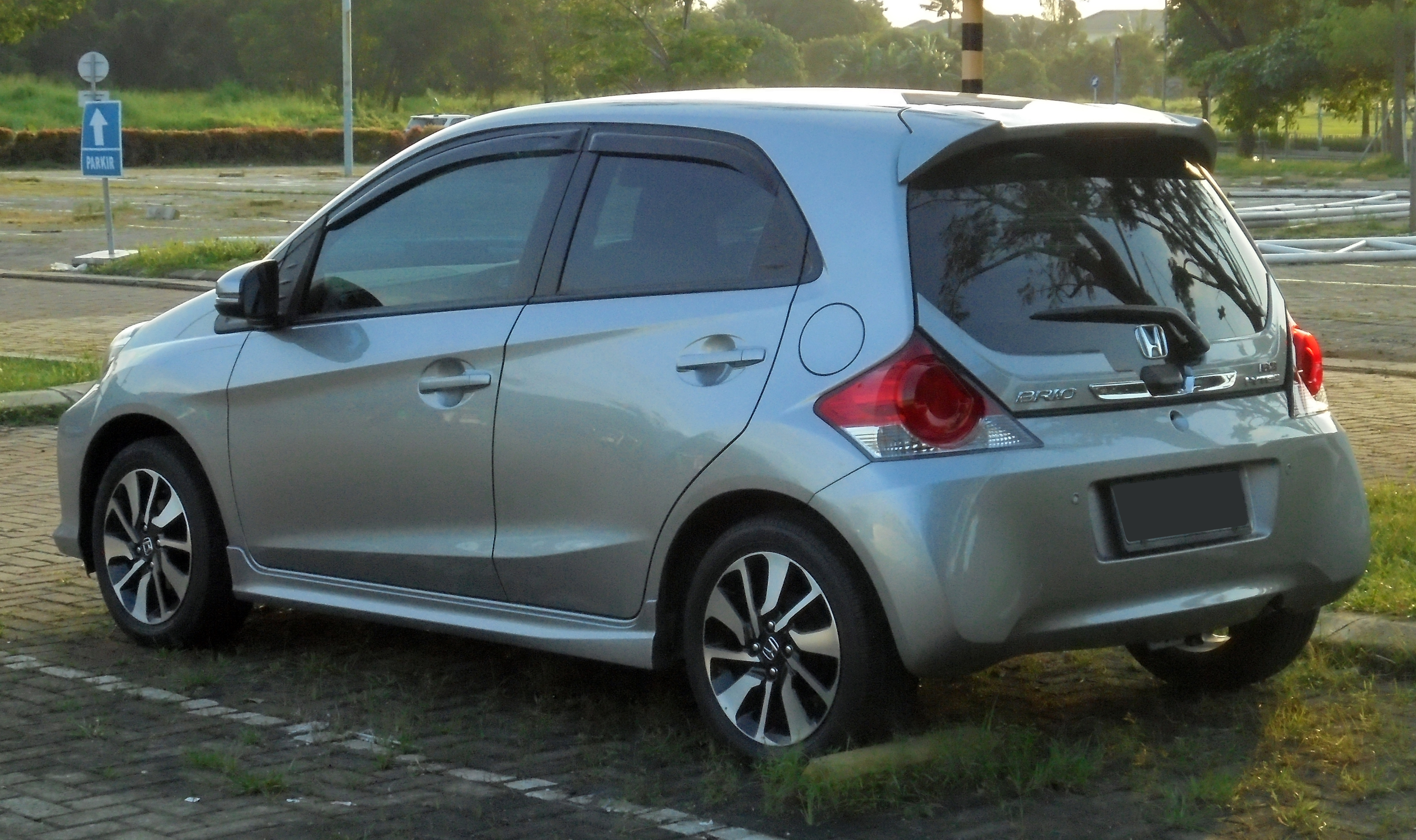
2017 Brio RS (DD1; facelift, Indonesia)

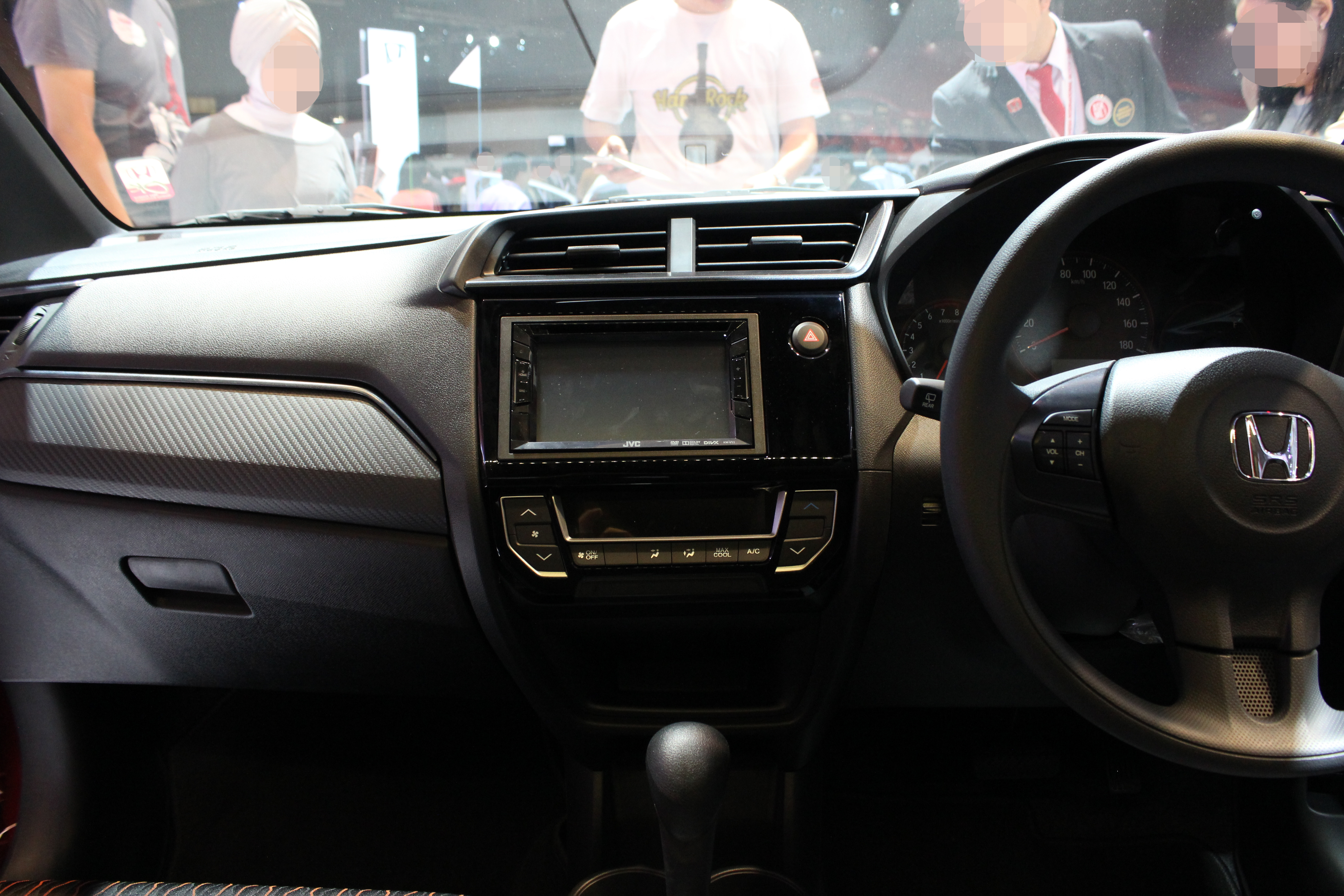
2016 Brio RS interior (facelift, Indonesia)

== Second generation (DD1; 2018) ==
Second generation
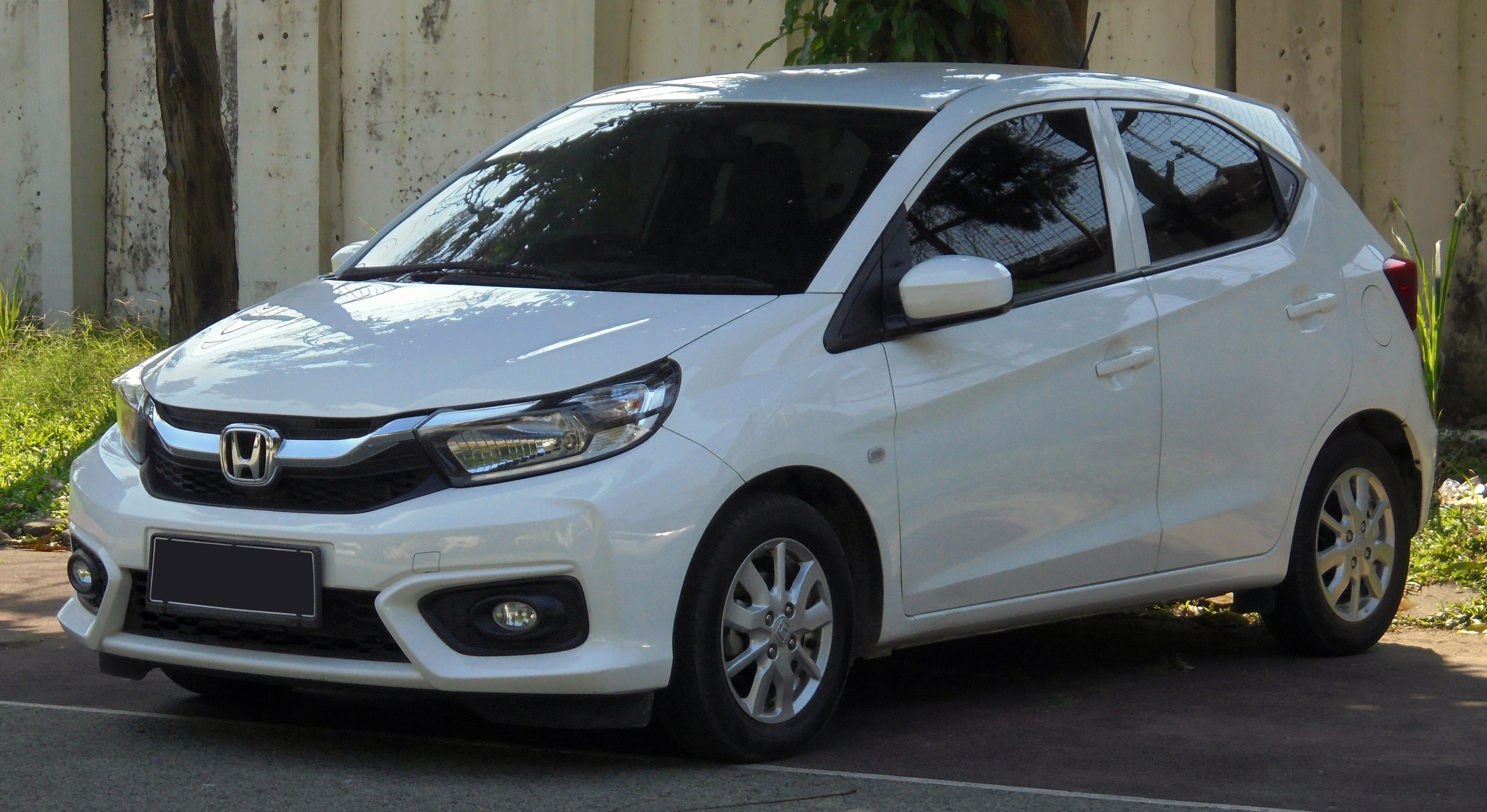
- 2019 Brio Satya E (DD1; pre-facelift, Indonesia)

Overview
- Model code: DD1
- Production: August 2018 – present
- Assembly: Indonesia: Karawang (HPM)
- Designer: Chavakorn Jirapiriyalert

Body and chassis
- Related: Honda Mobilio (second generation)

Powertrain
- Engine: Petrol: 1.2 L L12B3 i-VTEC I4 (DD1)
- Power output: 66 kW (89 hp; 90 PS)
- Transmission: 5-speed manual; CVT

Dimensions
- Wheelbase: 2,405 mm (94.7 in)
- Length: 3,795–3,815 mm (149.4–150.2 in)
- Width: 1,680 mm (66.1 in)
- Height: 1,485 mm (58.5 in)
- Kerb weight: 954–992 kg (2,103–2,187 lb)

The second-generation Brio was unveiled on 2 August 2018 at the 26th Gaikindo Indonesia International Auto Show. It was previewed by the Small RS Concept that was displayed at the 26th Indonesia International Motor Show in April 2018.

Unlike the second-generation Amaze, the second-generation Brio retained the same platform from the previous generation, albeit with an elongated chassis. While retaining the front side doors, front bumper and dashboard from the facelifted first-generation model, the grille, rear side doors, trunk and taillights were redesigned, and the headlights are shared with the facelifted second-generation Mobilio. The rear glass hatch is replaced by a conventional lift-up tailgate.

Due to the falling demand in Thailand and India, the second-generation Brio is exclusively manufactured in Indonesia. Exports from the country commenced on 26 March 2019 to the Philippines and Vietnam.

=== Markets ===
==== Indonesia ====
For the Indonesian market, the second-generation Brio is available in the same grade levels as the facelifted first-generation model, with either manual transmission or CVT. The first 200 units of the car were delivered to customers in Jakarta on 13 October 2018. Sales began nationwide in the same month. Equipment list is mostly carried over from the previous generation.

On 18 February 2021, the Urbanite Edition based on RS grade was launched. The variant received an update on 20 April 2022.

A facelift was released on 5 May 2023. The Brio RS gains a smart entry system which includes push-to-start button and an updated optitron instrument cluster panel, while the Brio RS Urbanite was discontinued from the lineup.

==== Philippines ====
The second-generation Brio was launched in the Philippines on 23 April 2019 and is imported from Indonesia. Grade levels consist of S MT, V CVT, RS CVT and RS Black Top CVT.

The facelifted Brio was launched on 13 July 2023 alongside the facelifted City. It retains the same three grades from the pre-facelift model, the entry-level S, the mid-grade V and the top-spec RS, with the same 1.2-litre i-VTEC engine mated to a 5-speed manual for the S grade, and a CVT for the latter two grades. Unlike the Indonesian market, the Philippine-market Brio RS doesn't get the push-to-start smart entry system and the optitron instrument gauge cluster as it retained the rotary-type ignition and the standard instrument cluster panel from the pre-facelift model.

==== Vietnam ====
The second-generation Brio RS was displayed as a prototype model in October 2018 at the Vietnam Motorshow. It was launched in Vietnam on 18 June 2019. As with the Philippine market, the second-generation Brio for the Vietnamese market was also imported from Indonesia until early 2022, when it was no longer imported since it does not meet the Euro 5 emission standards.

==== Brunei ====
The second-generation Brio in its facelift form was launched in Brunei on 19 November 2023. Imported from Indonesia, it is offered in E variant only mated to a CVT.

=== Gallery ===
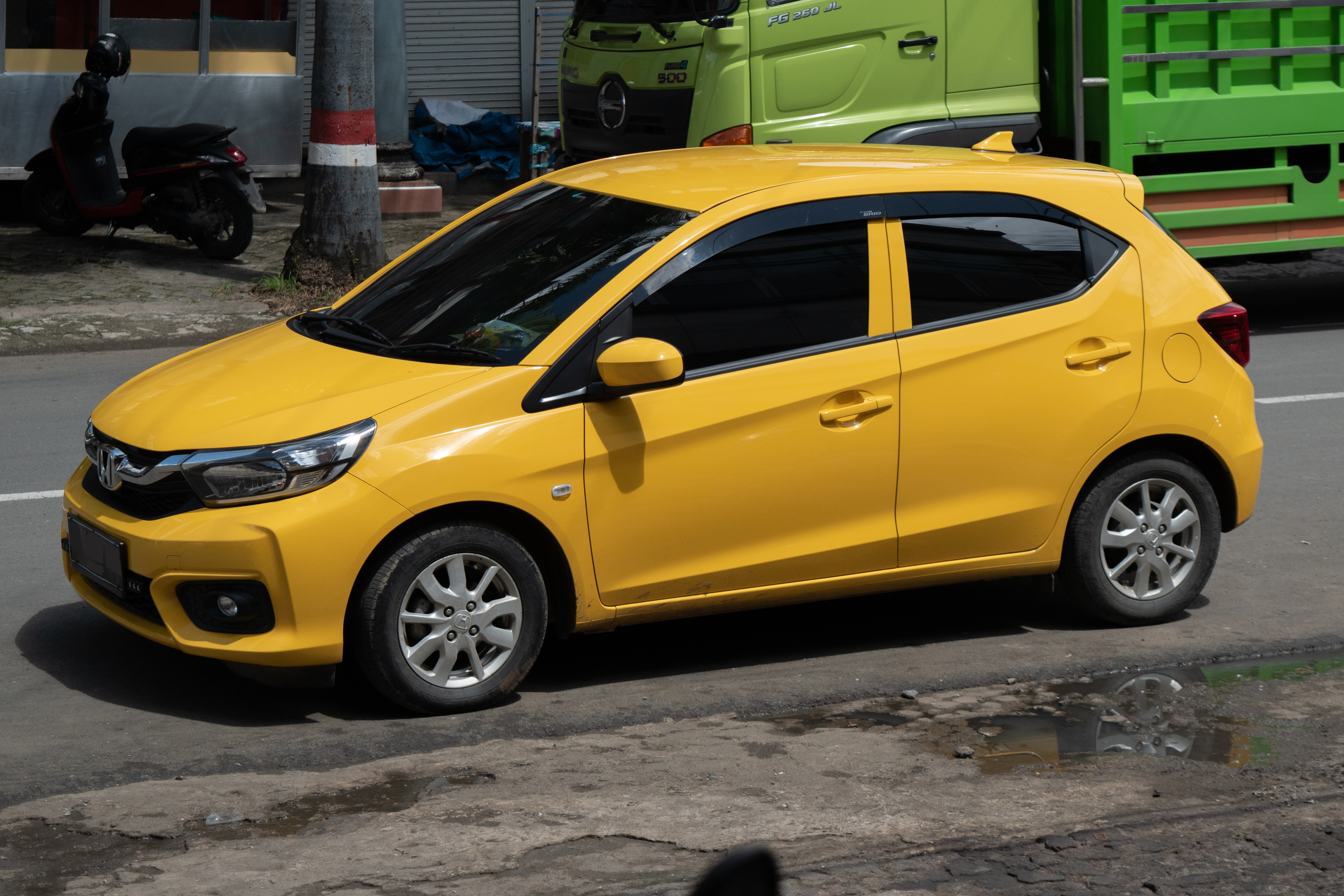
2022 Brio Satya E (pre-facelift)

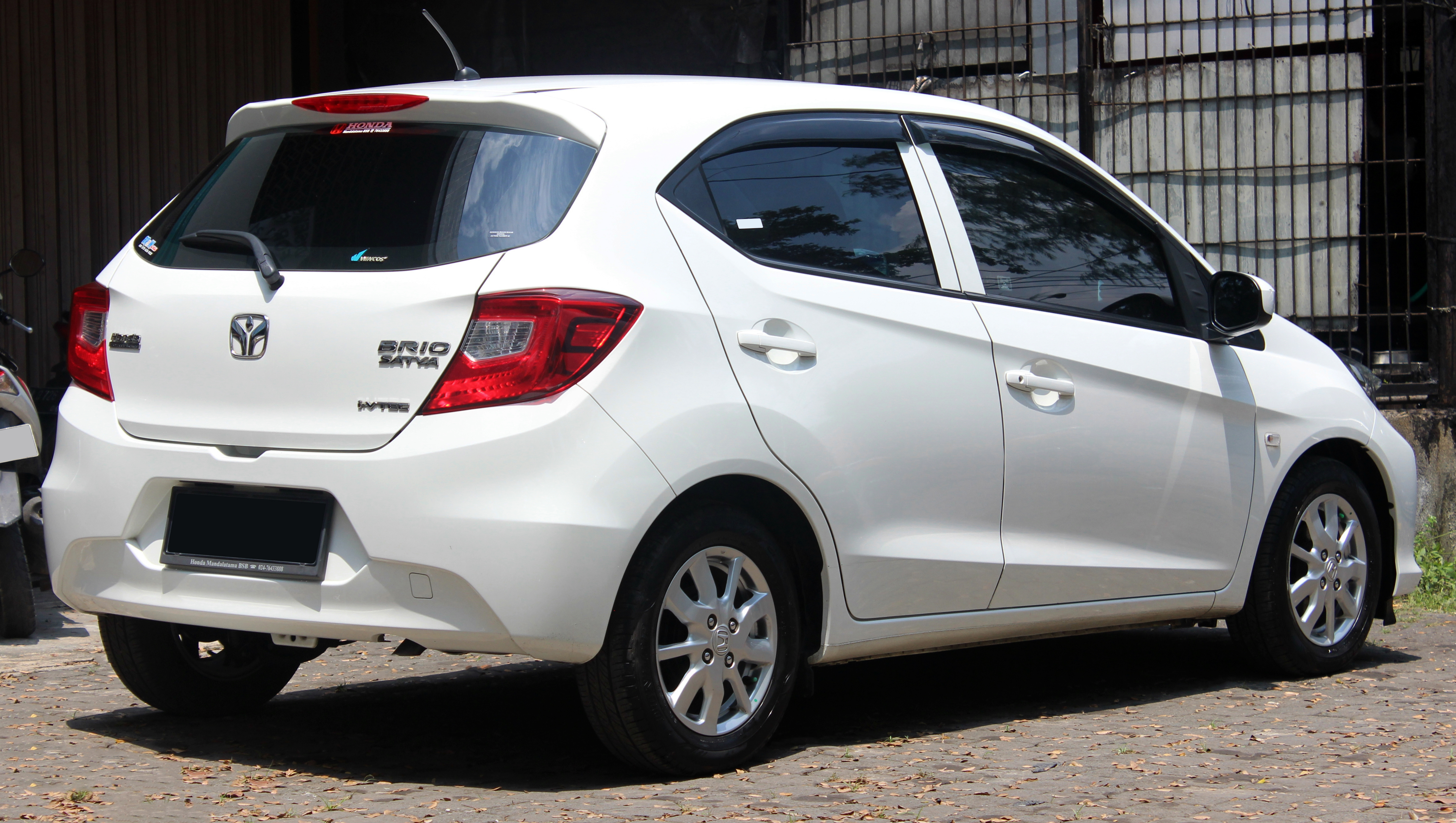
2020 Brio Satya E (pre-facelift)

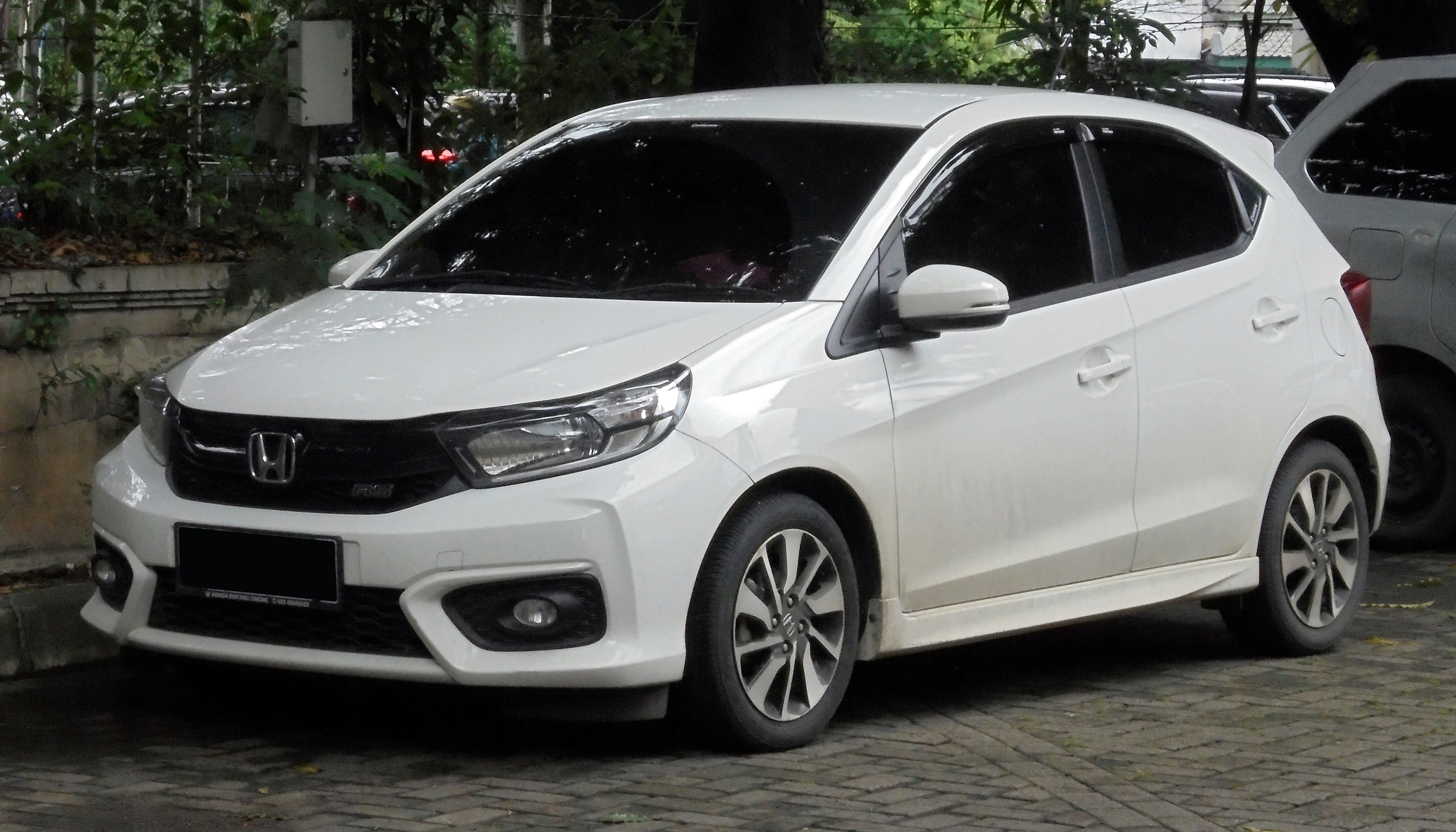
2021 Brio RS (pre-facelift)

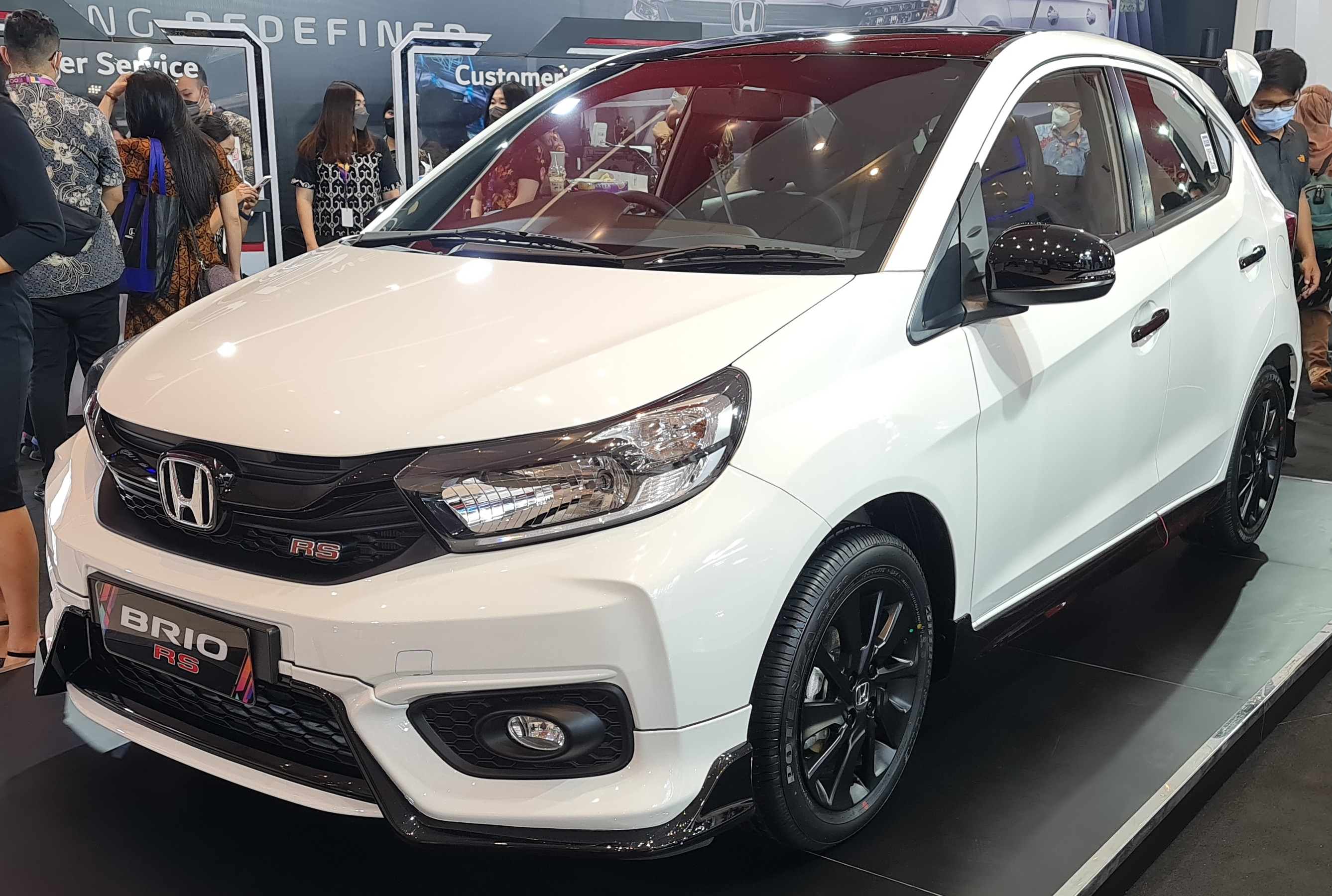
2022 Brio RS Urbanite Edition (pre-facelift)

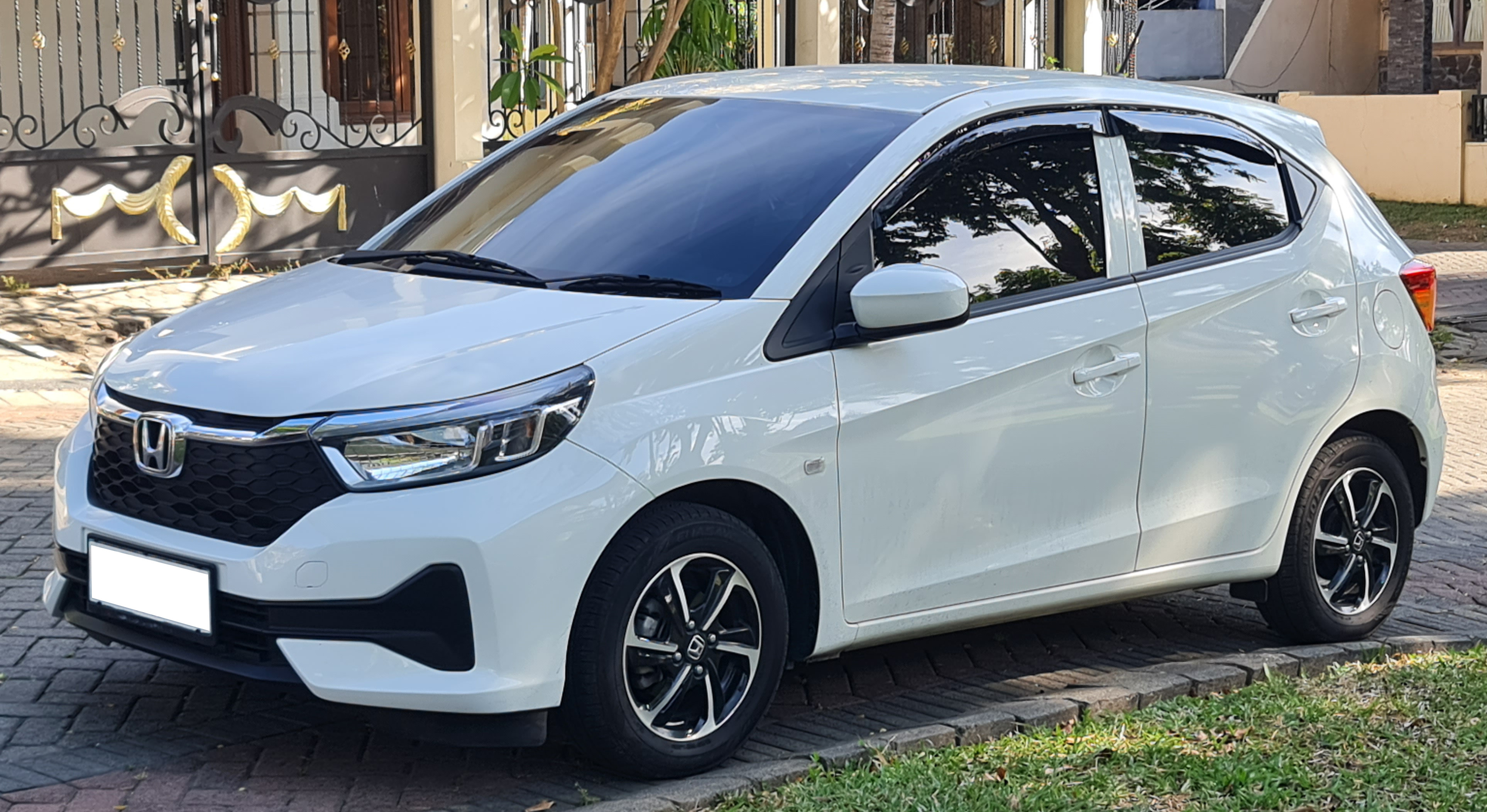
2023 Brio Satya E (facelift)

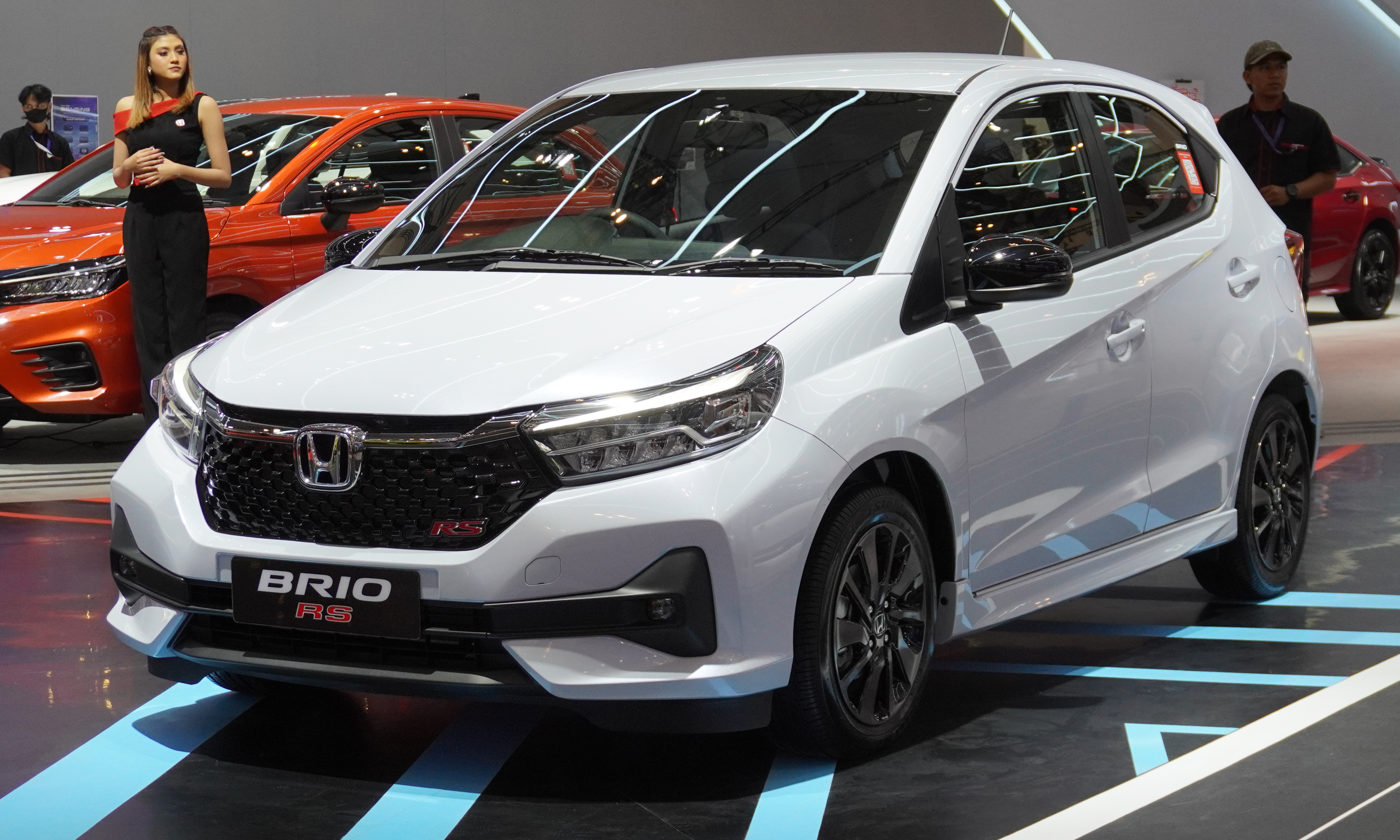
2023 Brio RS (facelift)

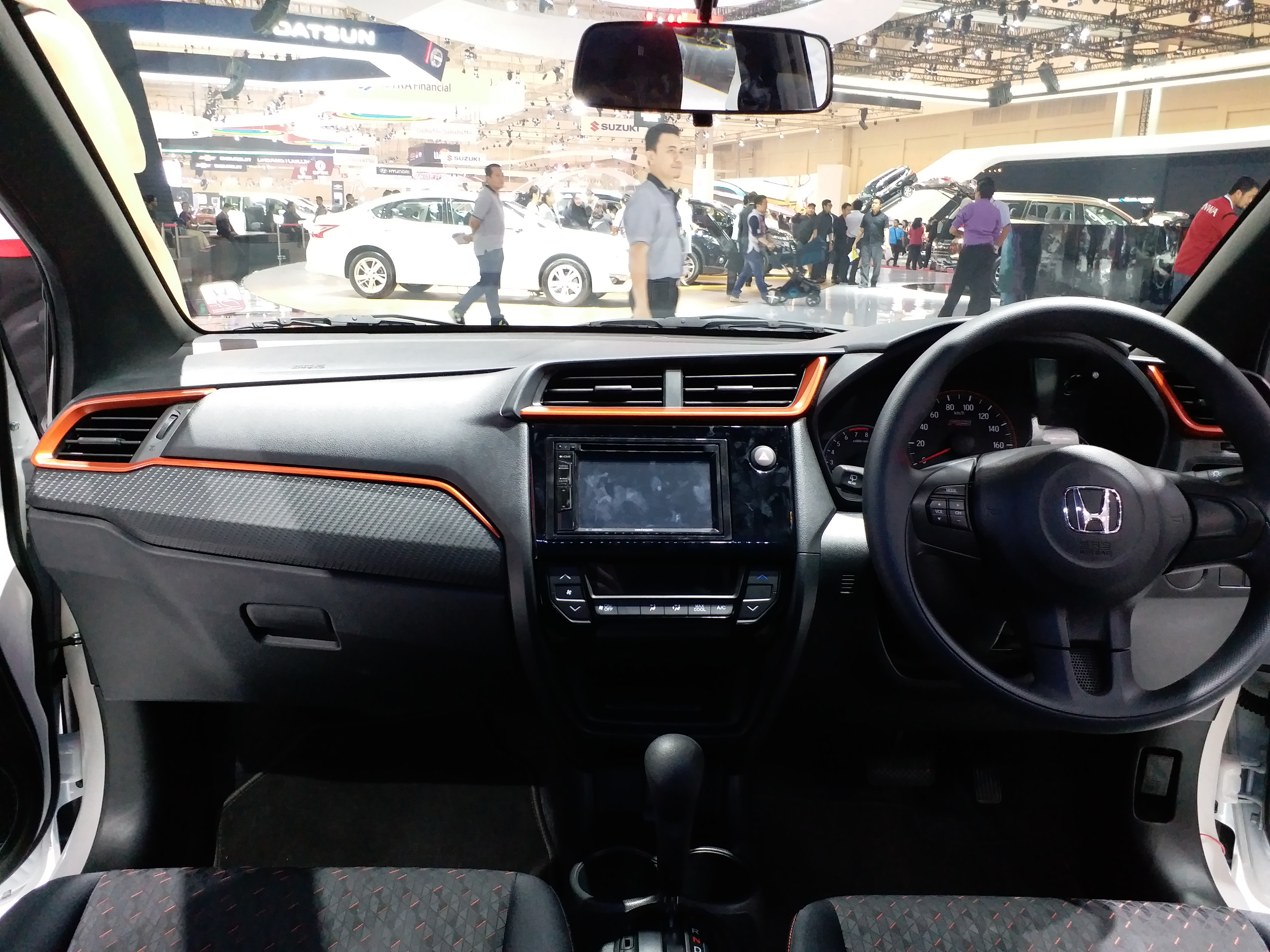
2018 Brio RS interior (pre-facelift)

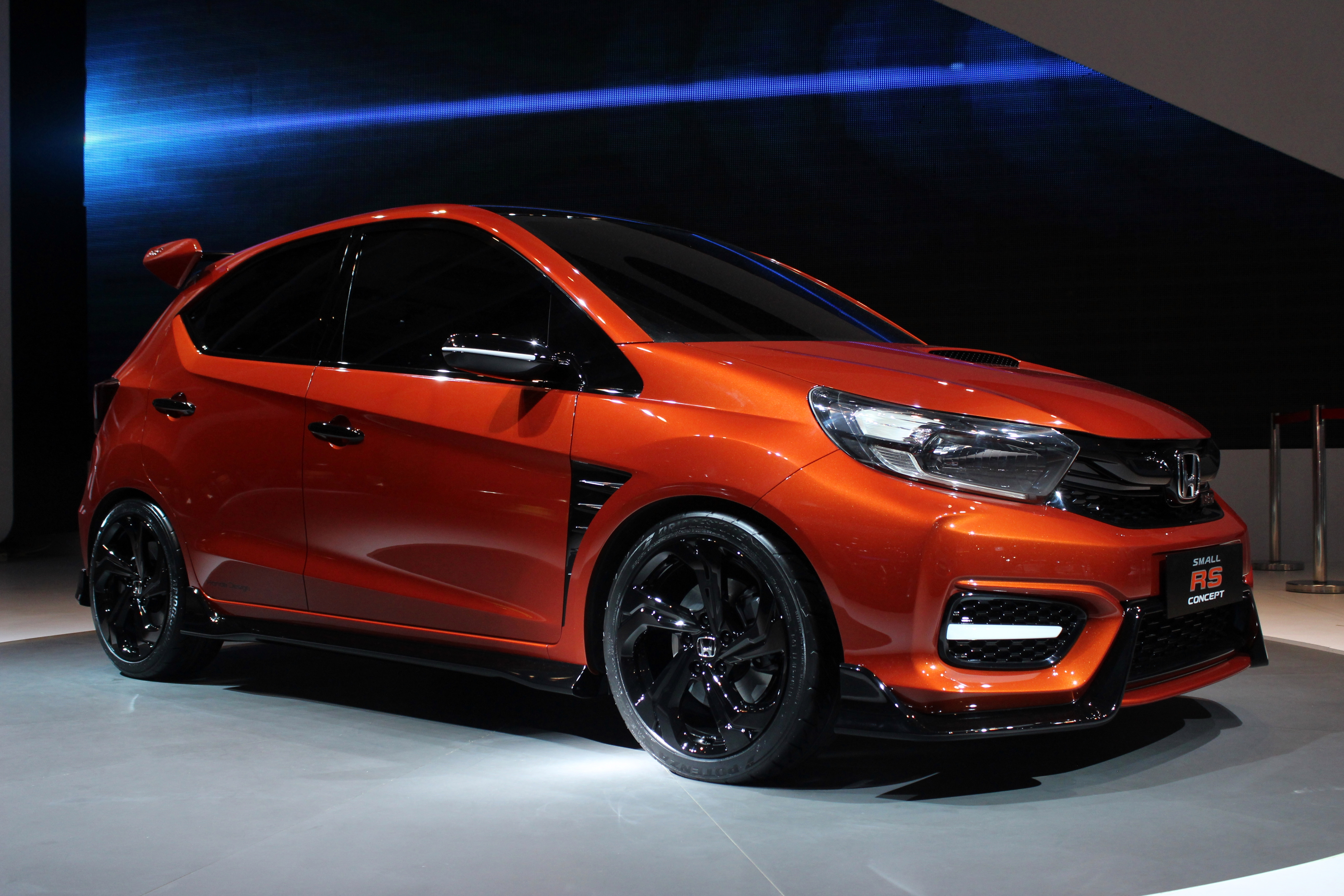
Small RS Concept

== Sales ==
In 2015, the Brio Satya became the third best-selling car in the LCGC category in Indonesia. In 2019, the Brio emerged as the second best-selling passenger car in Indonesia behind the Toyota Avanza. It gained the first position in 2020, replacing the Avanza which had held the position for 13 consecutive years. This position was held again in 2022, before being overtaken by the Toyota Innova in 2023. By April 2022, the Brio had been sold around 435,000 units in Indonesia.

In 2017, total sales in Asia and Oceania reached 65,325, an increase of 26% from the previous year.

Year	Indonesia	Thailand	India	Philippines	Vietnam
2011		3,177			
2012	8,002	12,863	31,221		
2013	17,165	8,567	24,954		
2014	38,693	1,896	13,246	948	
2015	43,426	822	10,618	1,925	
2016	46,496	835	7,260	3,441	
2017	53,958	1,504	5,412	3,946	
2018	59,251	1,347	2,277	2,558	
2019	70,344		3	2,896	
2020	40,879			3,260	2,906
2021	44,995			3,220	2,870
2022	61,025				
2023	62,195			2,504	
2024	51,133				
2025	33,233				
