= Honda Prospect Motor =

Indonesian automobile company

PT Honda Prospect Motor
- Type: Joint venture
- Industry: Automotive
- Predecessors: PT Imora Motor; PT Prospect Motor; PT Honda Prospect Engine Manufacturing (Indonesia)
- Founded: 15 February 1999; 27 years ago
- Headquarters: Jakarta, Indonesia
- Area served: Indonesia
- Key people: Masanao Kataoka (president director)
- Products: Cars
- Production output: ▲103,023 units (2024) ▼31,233 units (2025)
- Owners: Honda Motor Co., Ltd. (51%); PT Prospect Motor (49%)
- Number of employees: 6,900 (2014)
- Website: www.honda-indonesia.com

PT Honda Prospect Motor (abbreviated HPM) is a subsidiary of Honda automobiles for production, marketing and export of passenger cars in Indonesia. Based in Jakarta, it is a joint venture company between Honda (51%) and Prospect Motor (49%). Established on 15 February 1999, HPM replaced PT Imora Motor (stands for Istana Mobil Raya) as the sole distributor of Honda cars in Indonesia.

== History ==
Honda cars have been sold in Indonesia since 1968 through Prospect's affiliated sales company, PT Imora Motor. In 1975, Prospect began local consignment production of Honda automobiles, responding to Indonesian government policy to encourage local automobile production. Honda vehicle sales in 1997 totaled 6,872 units (up 7% over 1996) but declined by 83% in 1998, to 1,182 units, mainly due to the economic crisis that hit the Southeast Asian region.

In 1999, Honda Motor Co., Ltd. established a joint venture company called PT Honda Prospect Motor (HPM) on 15 February 1999. HPM merged Honda's Indonesian automobile businesses, which was previously conducted by four separate companies ranging across vehicle assembly, engine and component manufacturing, and wholesale distribution. HPM was capitalized at US$70 million, with 51% initially held by Honda's partner PT Prospect Motor and 49% by Honda Motor Co., Ltd.

== Facilities ==
HPM began local automobile production in 2003 after the establishment of its first manufacturing plant in Karawang, with the Stream as the first car produced. Prior to the establishment of Karawang plant, Honda assembled vehicles at the older facility owned by Prospect Motor in Sunter, North Jakarta. Its development was supported with Rp 700 billion investment. Initial annual capacity was set to reach 40,000 by 2004. The 100,000th car produced by the Karawang Plant rolled off the production line on January 29, 2007. HPM started exporting the Freed to Thailand and Malaysia from 2010 to 2014, and later the Brio to the Philippines and Vietnam from 2019.

To serve the increasing demand for Honda products in Indonesia, HPM opened a second manufacturing plant next to the existing plant on January 15, 2014 which increased its total annual production capacity from 80,000 units to 200,000 units. The first model produced was the Mobilio, which 86 percent of its parts were produced locally. With total investment of Rp 3.1 trillion, the second factory has total building area of 145,760 m^{2} with main production line facilities including welding area, engine assembly, frame assembly, and painting area. The factory also supported with including material supply area, stamping, plastic injection, plastic painting and vehicle quality.

On 27 February 2017, HPM celebrated one million automobile production milestone.

== Models ==
=== Current models ===
Model	Indonesian introduction	Current model		Current production status
Model	Indonesian introduction	Introduction (model code)	Update/facelift	Current production status
Sedan
City	1996	2021 (GN2)	2023	Imported from Thailand
Civic	1976	2021 (FE4)	2025	Imported from Thailand
Accord	1978	2023 (CY2)	—	Imported from Thailand
Hatchback
Super-One	2026	2026 (JG6)	—	Imported from Japan
Brio	2012	2018 (DD1)	2023	Assembled in Indonesia
SUV/crossover
WR-V	2022	2022 (DG4)	2026	Assembled in Indonesia
BR-V	2016	2021 (DG3)	—	Assembled in Indonesia
HR-V	2015	2022 (RV3/5)	2025	Assembled in Indonesia
CR-V	1999	2023 (RS5)	—	Imported from Thailand
MPV
Stepwgn	2025	2025 (RP8)	—	Imported from Japan
Sports car
Prelude	2026	2026 (BF1)	—	Imported from Japan

=== Former models ===
==== Manufactured locally ====
- Honda Accord (1978–2002)
- Honda City Hatchback (2021–2025)
- Honda Civic (1975–2005)
- Honda CR-V (1999–2023)
- Honda Freed (2009–2016)
- Honda Jazz (2004–2021)
- Honda Mobilio (2014–2024)
- Honda Stream (2003–2007)

==== Imported ====
- Honda Civic Hatchback (2017–2021, imported from Thailand)
- Honda Civic Type R (2018–2026, imported from Japan)
- Honda CR-Z (2012–2018, imported from Japan)
- Honda e:N1 (2024–2026, imported from China)
- Honda Life (1973–1976, imported from Japan)
- Honda Odyssey (2005–2021, imported from Japan)

== President Directors ==
- Kenji Otaka (2003–2007)
- Yukihiro Aoshima (2007–2011)
- Tomoki Uchida (2011–2017)
- Takehiro Watanabe (2017–2022)
- Kotaro Shimizu (2022–2024)
- Shugo Watanabe (2024–2026)
- Masanao Kataoka (2026–present)
