= Philippine International Motor Show =

- Status: Active
- Venue: World Trade Center Metro Manila
- Locations: Pasay, Philippines
- Country: Philippines
- Inaugurated: since 2008

The Philippine International Motor Show, or PIMS, is an auto show that took place on August 9, 2007 at the Philippine World Trade Center. It ended August 12, 2007.

The Chamber of Automotive Manufacturers of the Philippines (CAMPI) produced the exhibition. The show exhibited products, models, services, and technologies related to automobiles.

Participating car companies at the show included Columbian Autocar Corporation, Honda Cars Philippines Inc., General Motors Philippines Inc., Isuzu Philippines Corp., Mitsubishi Motors Philippines Corp., Nissan Motor Philippines Inc., PGA Cars Inc., Scandinavian Motors Corp., Suzuki Philippines Inc., Toyota Motor Philippines Inc., and Universal Motors Corp.

== Second Philippine International Motor Show ==
CAMPI held the second Philippine International Motor Show from August 21–24, 2008 at the World Trade Center Metro Manila. The opening ceremonies featured President Gloria Macapagal-Arroyo as keynote speaker. Fifteen global auto brands participated, including Audi, BMW, Chevrolet, Ford, Honda, Isuzu, Kia, Mazda, Mitsubishi, Nissan, Porsche, Suzuki, Toyota, and Volvo.

== Third Philippine International Motor Show ==
The 3rd Philippine International Motor Show at the World Trade Center from August 19–22, 2010. All 15 CAMPI members will be there with their respective brands, from European nameplates like Audi, BMW, Mercedes Benz, Porsche and Volvo to familiar Japanese marques like Honda, Isuzu, Mitsubishi, Nissan, Suzuki, and Toyota. Korean carmakers will be represented by Hyundai and Kia, Chevrolet will carry the banner for American cars while China will have Chana on its side

== Fourth Philippine International Motor Show ==
The Chamber of Automotive Manufacturers of the Philippines, Inc. (CAMPI) recently stage at the World Trade Center exhibition halls for the 2012 and 4th Philippine International motor Show (PIMS) from August 16–19.

== Fifth Philippine International Motor Show ==
The fifth event was held on September 18–21, 2014.

== Sixth Philippine International Motor Show ==
The Sixth event was held on September 14–18, 2016 at the WTC Metro Manila.

== Seventh Philippine International Auto Show ==
The 7th year of the motor show event in the Philippines. With 17 car brands at all time, on October 24–28, 2018, at World Trade Center Metro Manila, Pasay.

== Eighth Philippine International Auto Show ==
The 8th year of the motor show event was held on September 15–18, 2022. This event was supposed to be scheduled on September 17–20, 2020, but due to the COVID-19 outbreak in the country, the event was pushed back to 2 years. This year's event was participated by 13 car brands, including the new members of CAMPI such as Chery, Geely and Hyundai.

== Ninth Philippine International Auto Show ==
The 9th year of the motor show event will be held on October 24 to 27, 2024, it is also known as the 9th Philippine International Motor Show presented by Netflix after CAMPI signed a five-year partnership deal with Netflix.
