= Honda Freed =

Compact MPV

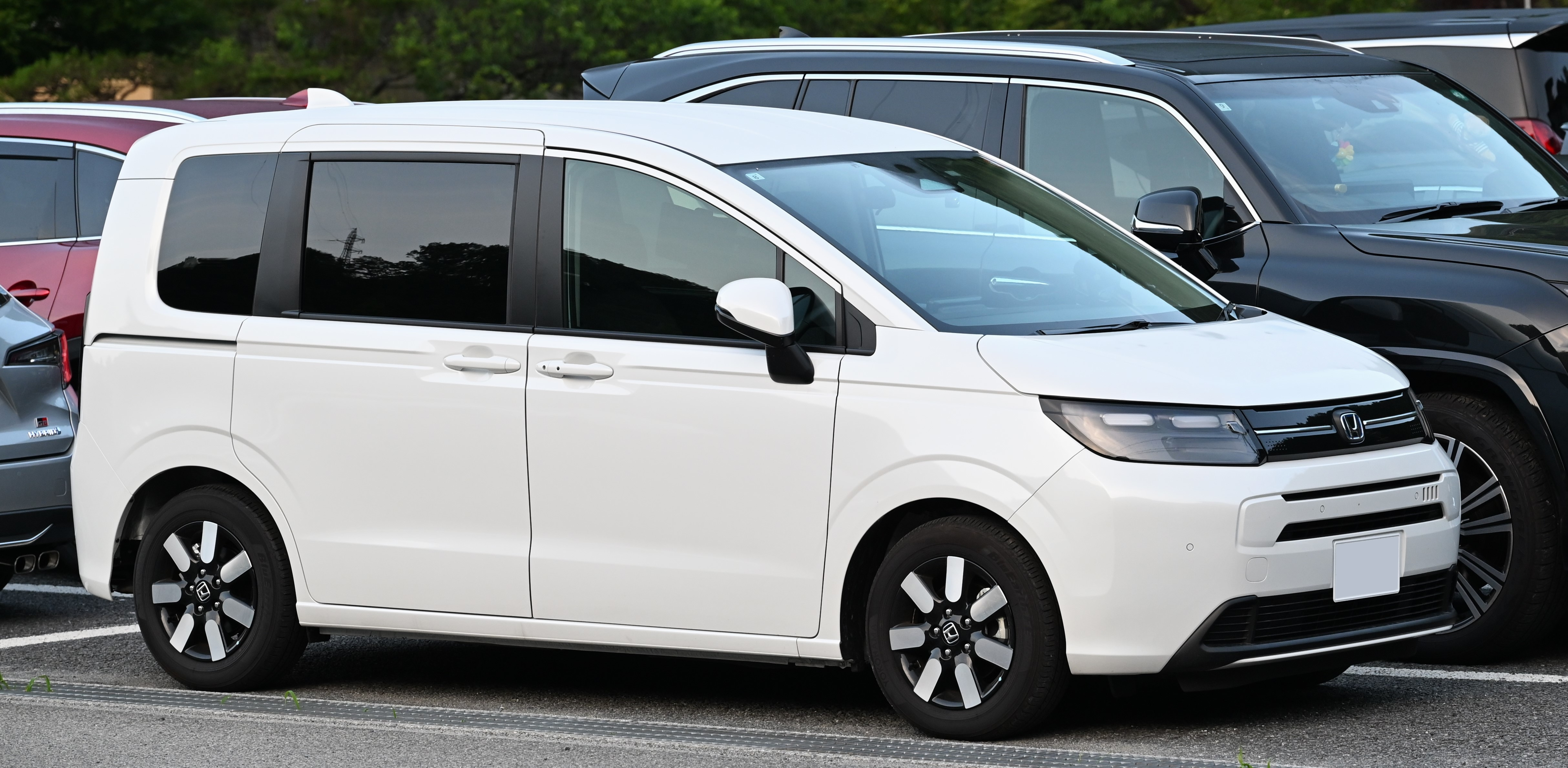
- Honda Freed e:HEV (3rd generation, Japan)

Overview
- Manufacturer: Honda
- Production: 2008–present

Body and chassis
- Class: Mini MPV
- Body style: 5-door minivan

Chronology
- Predecessor: Honda Mobilio (first generation)

The Honda Freed (Japanese: ホンダ・フリード, Hepburn: Honda Furīdo) is a mini MPV produced by the Japanese automaker Honda since 2008. The vehicle is designed mainly for the need of Japanese consumers. It is based on the Fit/Jazz platform and acts as a replacement for the first generation Mobilio in Japan. Three different versions of the Freed are available: a six-seater version which features captain's seats in the second row, a seven-seater version and a five-seater version. Honda also stated that a wheelchair-accessible model is offered in addition to versions with a side lift-up seat and passenger lift-up seat.

== First generation (GB3/GB4/GP3; 2008) ==
First generation
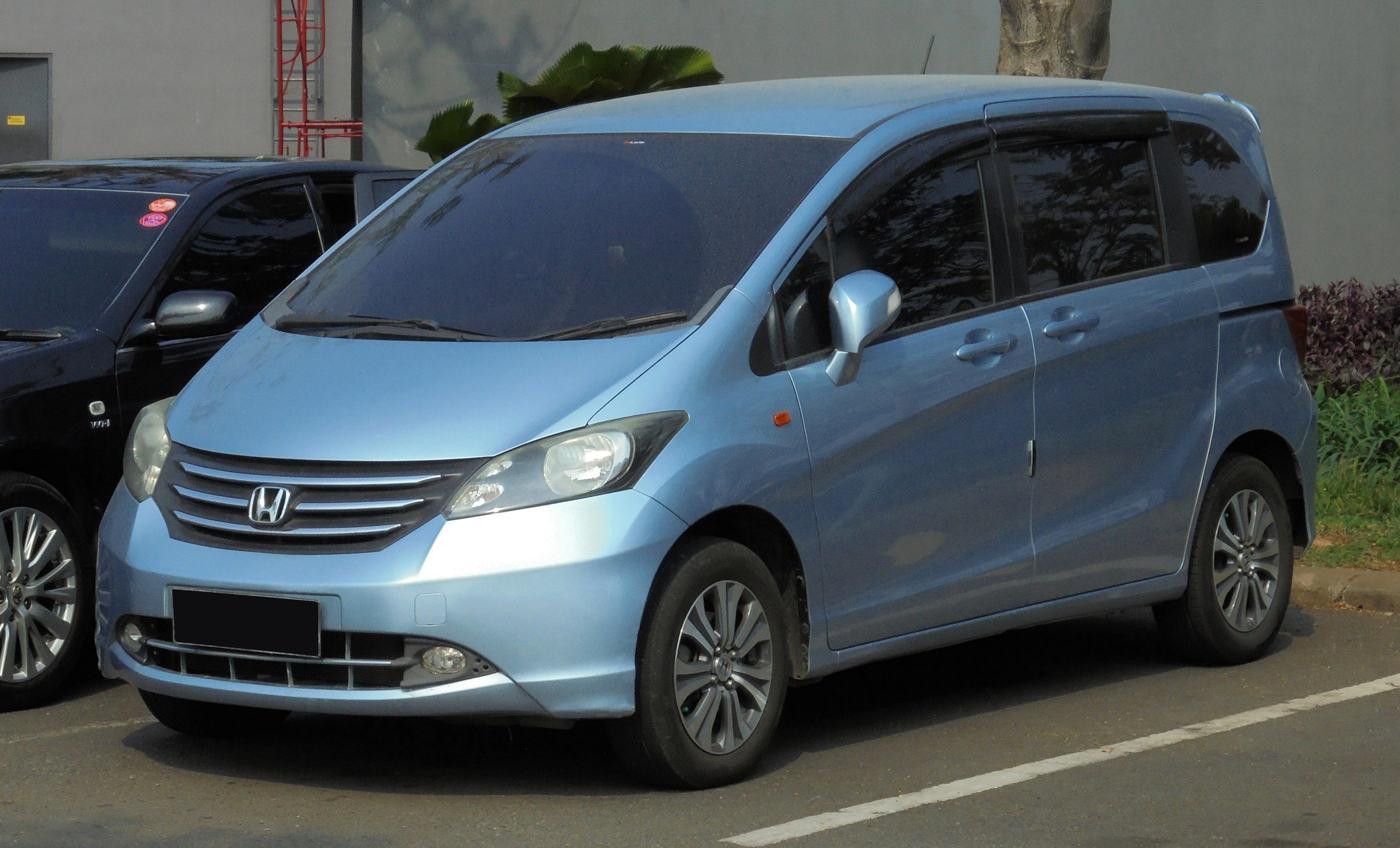
- 2009‐2011 Honda Freed E 1.5 (Indonesia; pre-facelift)

Overview
- Model code: GB3; GB4; GP3
- Production: May 2008– September 2016
- Assembly: Japan: Sayama, Saitama (Sayama Plant); Indonesia: Karawang (HPM)

Body and chassis
- Layout: Front-engine, front-wheel-drive Front-engine, four-wheel-drive
- Related: Honda Fit/Jazz (second generation); Honda City/Ballade (fifth generation)

Powertrain
- Engine: 1.5 L L15A7 SOHC I4; 1.5 L LEA SOHC I4 (Honda IMA hybrid system)
- Transmission: 5-speed automatic CVT
- Hybrid drivetrain: Honda Integrated Motor Assist (IMA)

Dimensions
- Wheelbase: 2,740 mm (107.9 in)
- Length: 4,210–4,215 mm (165.7–165.9 in)
- Width: 1,695 mm (66.7 in)
- Height: 1,715–1,745 mm (67.5–68.7 in)
- Curb weight: 1,270–1,420 kg (2,799.9–3,130.6 lb)

Chronology
- Predecessor: Honda Stream (Indonesia)
- Successor: Honda Mobilio/BR-V (Indonesia)

=== Engine ===
The Freed is equipped with a 1.5-litre engine with 118 horsepower, which is the same engine that is used in the Jazz/City, but the engine used has more torque. The Freed's engine produces 118 hp (88 kW) and 148 N⋅m (109 lbf⋅ft) of torque, while the Jazz/City delivers 120 hp (89 kW) with 145 N⋅m (107 lbf⋅ft) of torque.

=== Japan ===
The first generation Freed was available in Japan in two types; the petrol powered in G or G Aero grade and also a hybrid variant. The hybrid variant uses i-VTEC together with Honda's IMA hybrid car technology.

The facelifted Freed was launched in the Japanese market on 28 October 2011, securing sales of over 20,000 units in its first two weeks on sale, of which 63% were of the hybrid model.

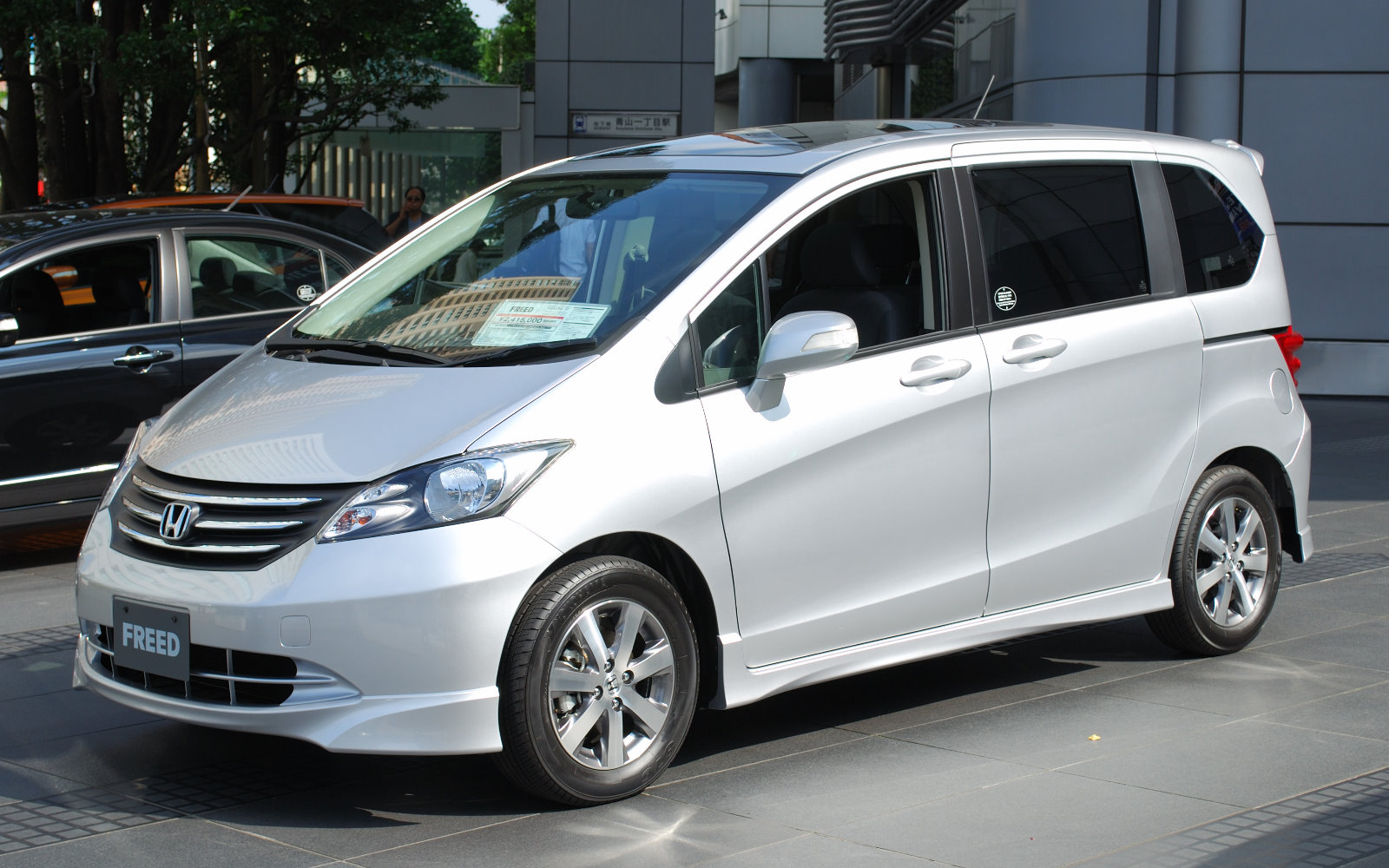
Freed (Japan; pre-facelift)

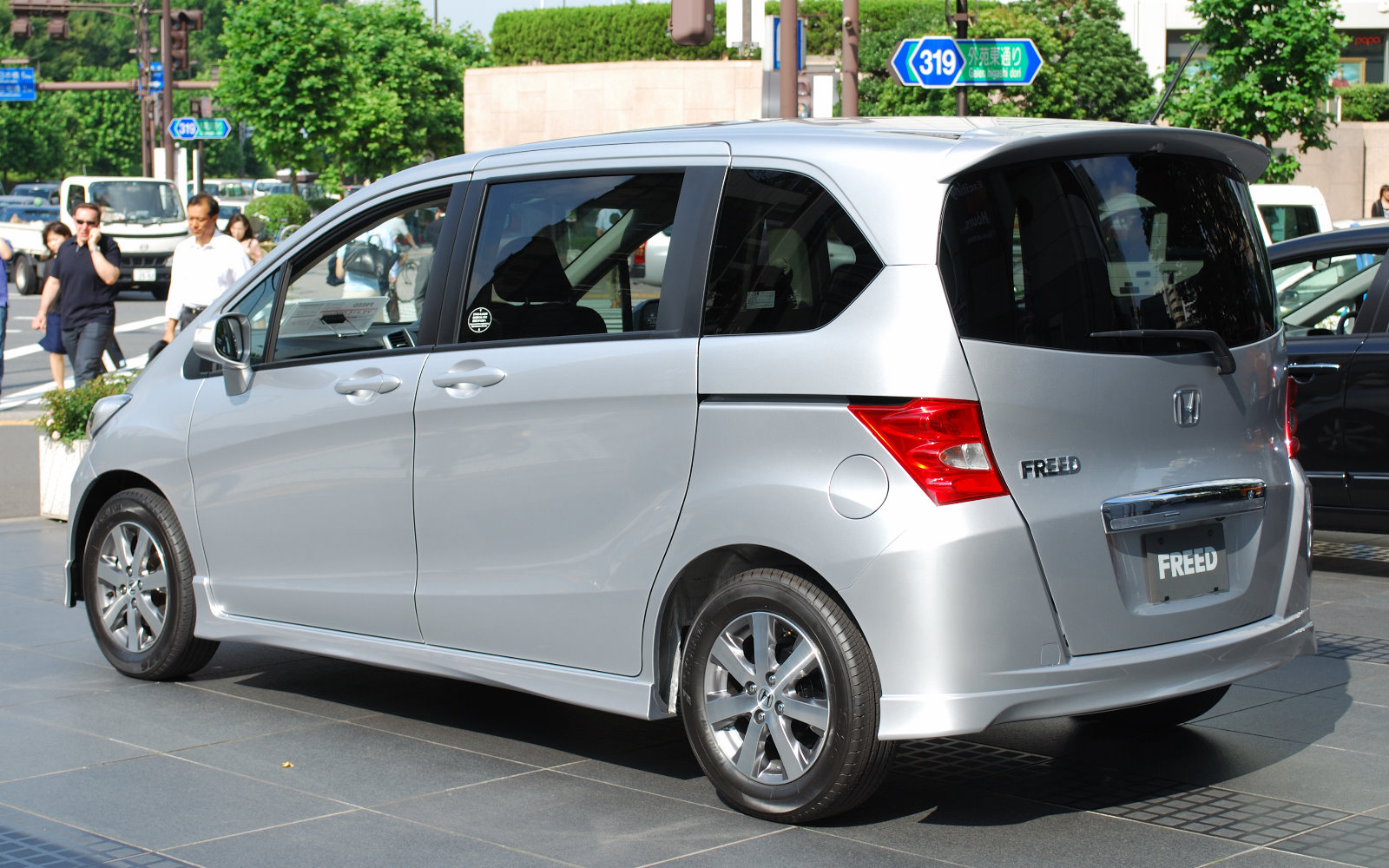
Freed (Japan; pre-facelift)

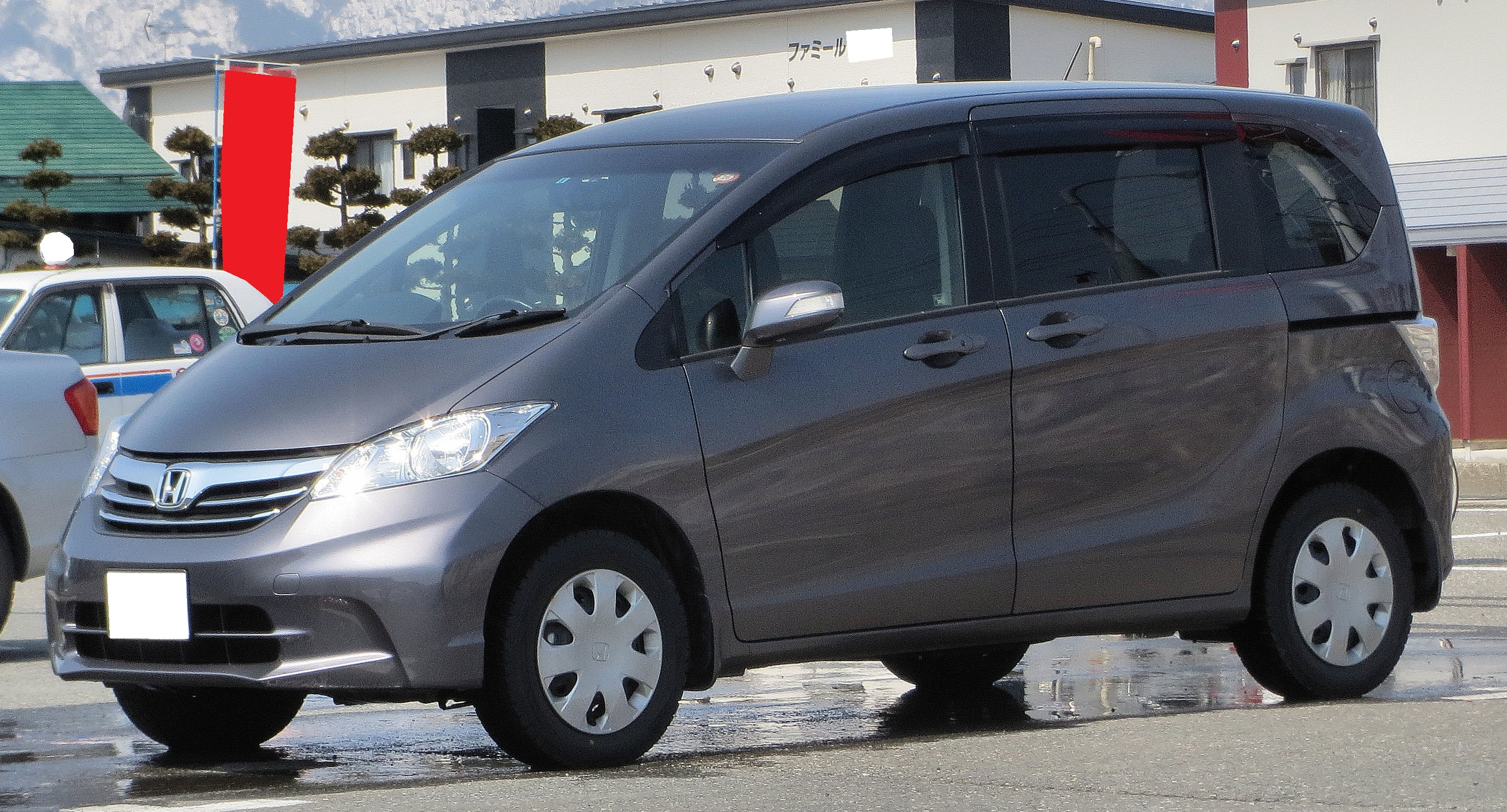
Freed (Japan; first facelift)

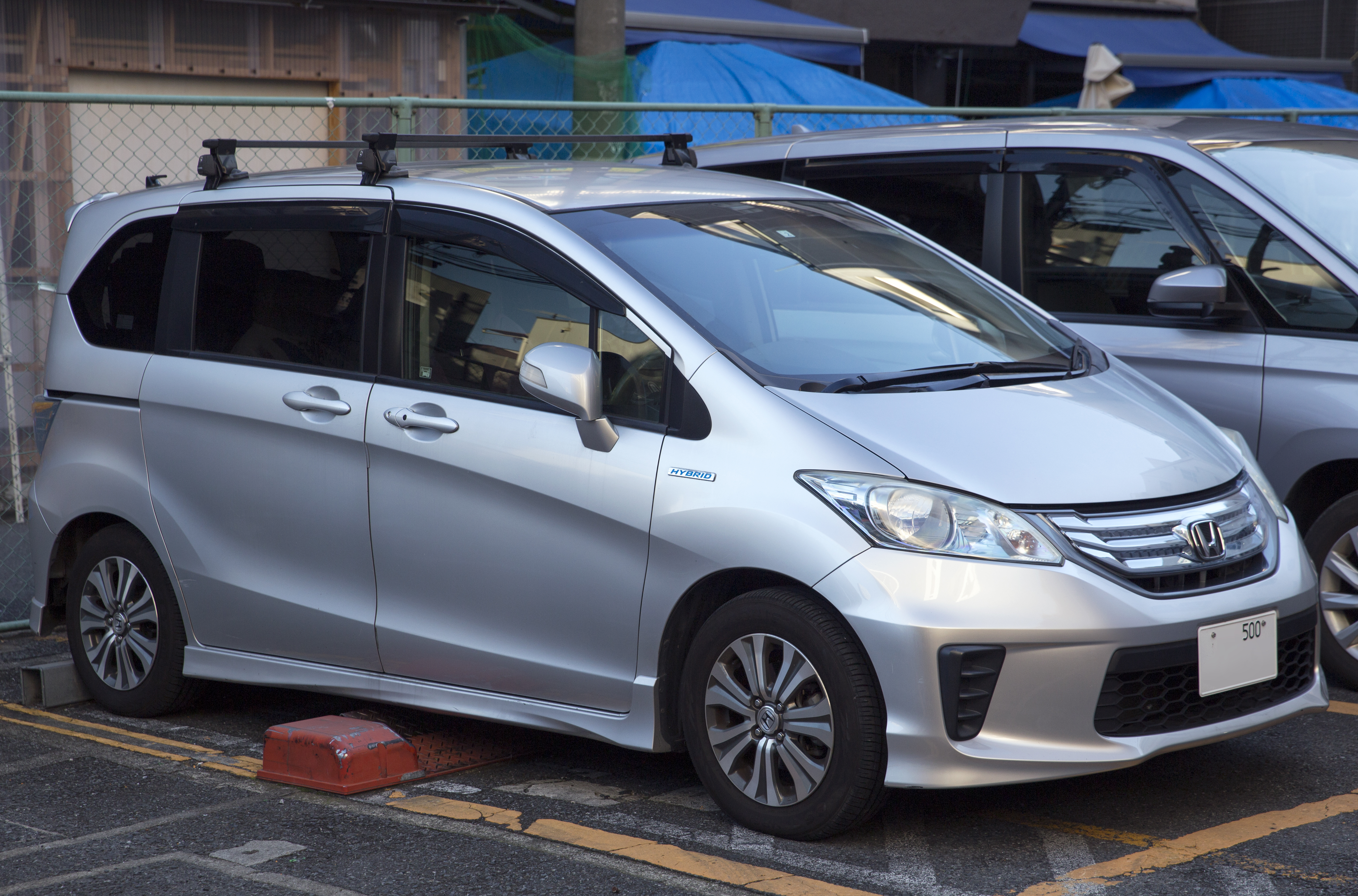
Freed Hybrid (first facelift)

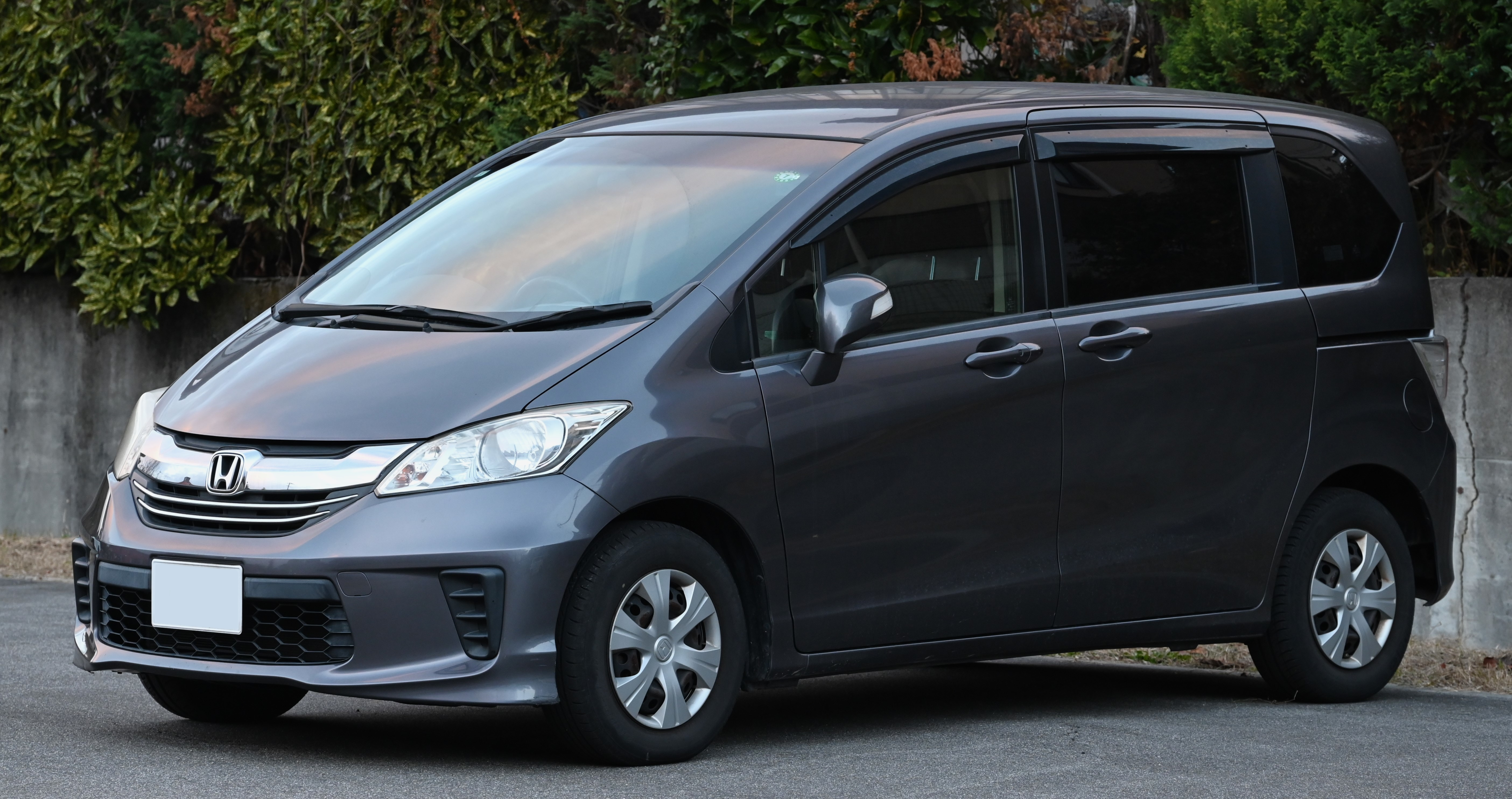
Freed (Japan; second facelift)

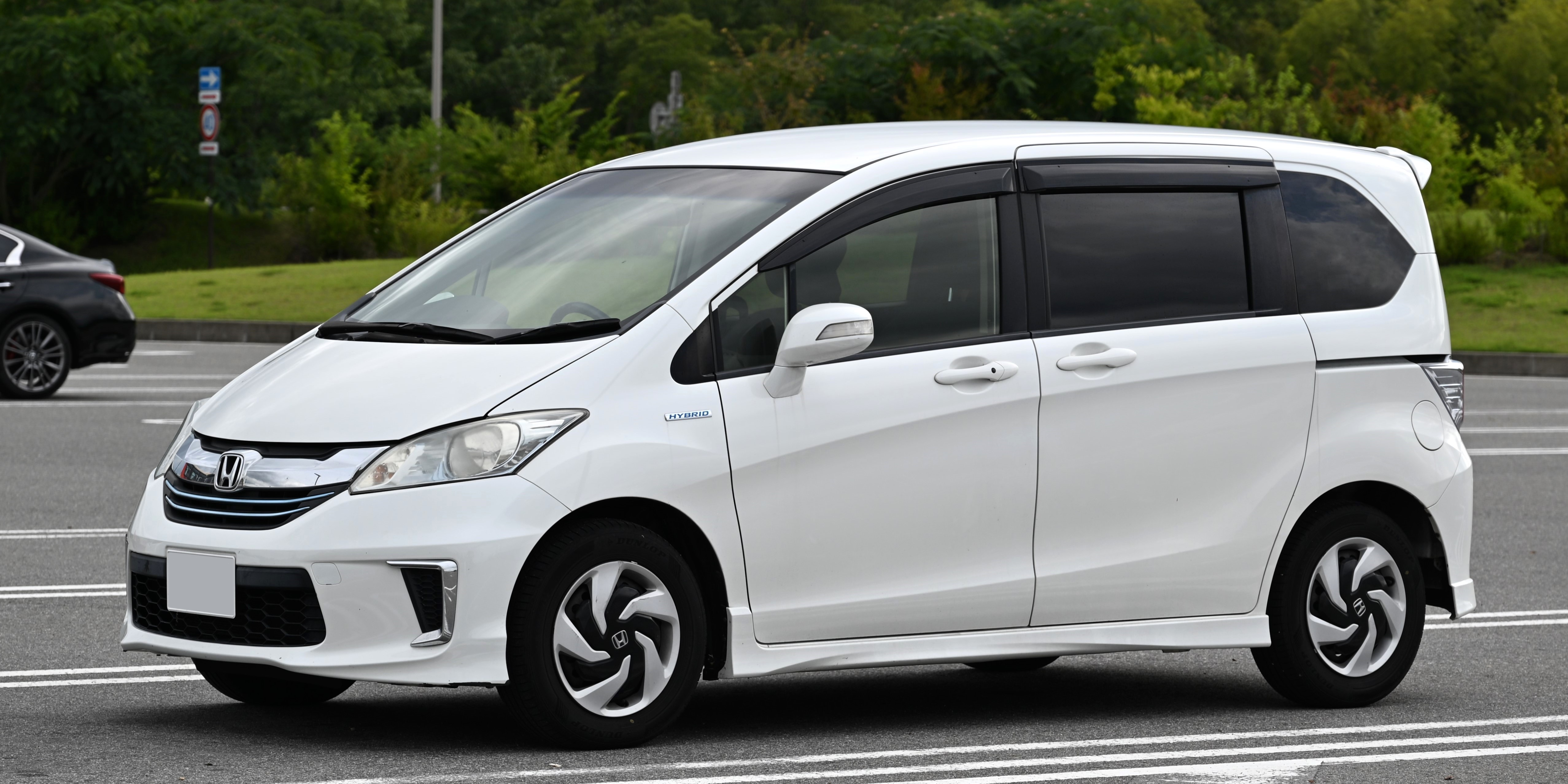
Freed Hybrid (Japan; second facelift)

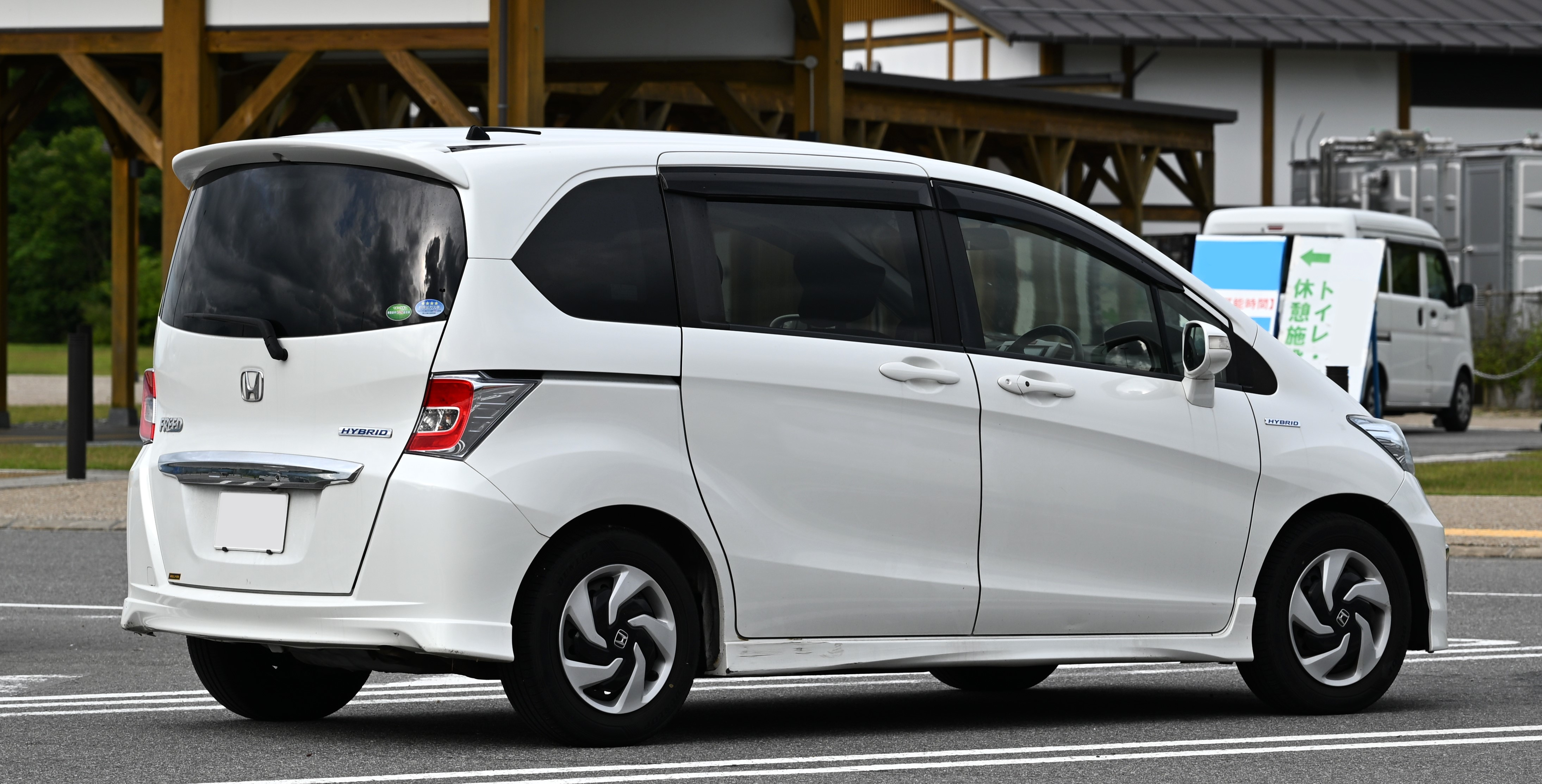
Rear view (facelift)

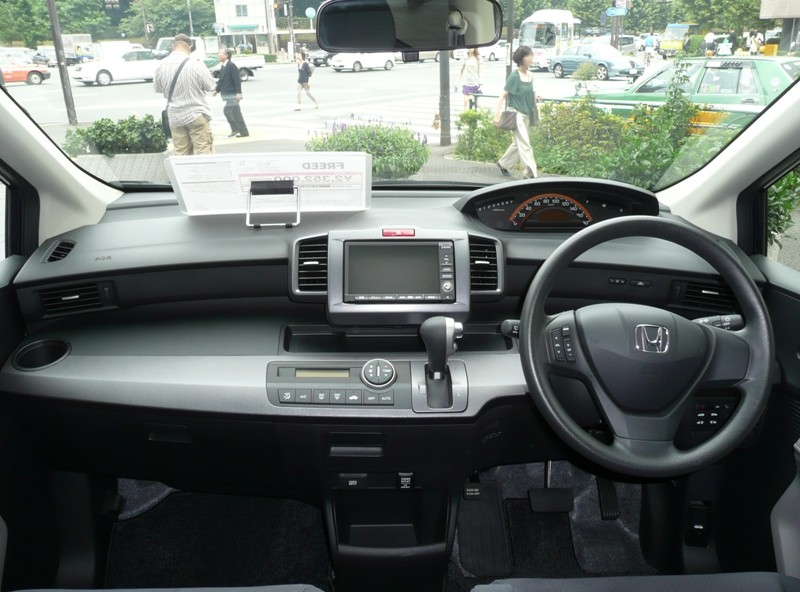
Freed interior (pre-facelift; with Internavi navigation display)

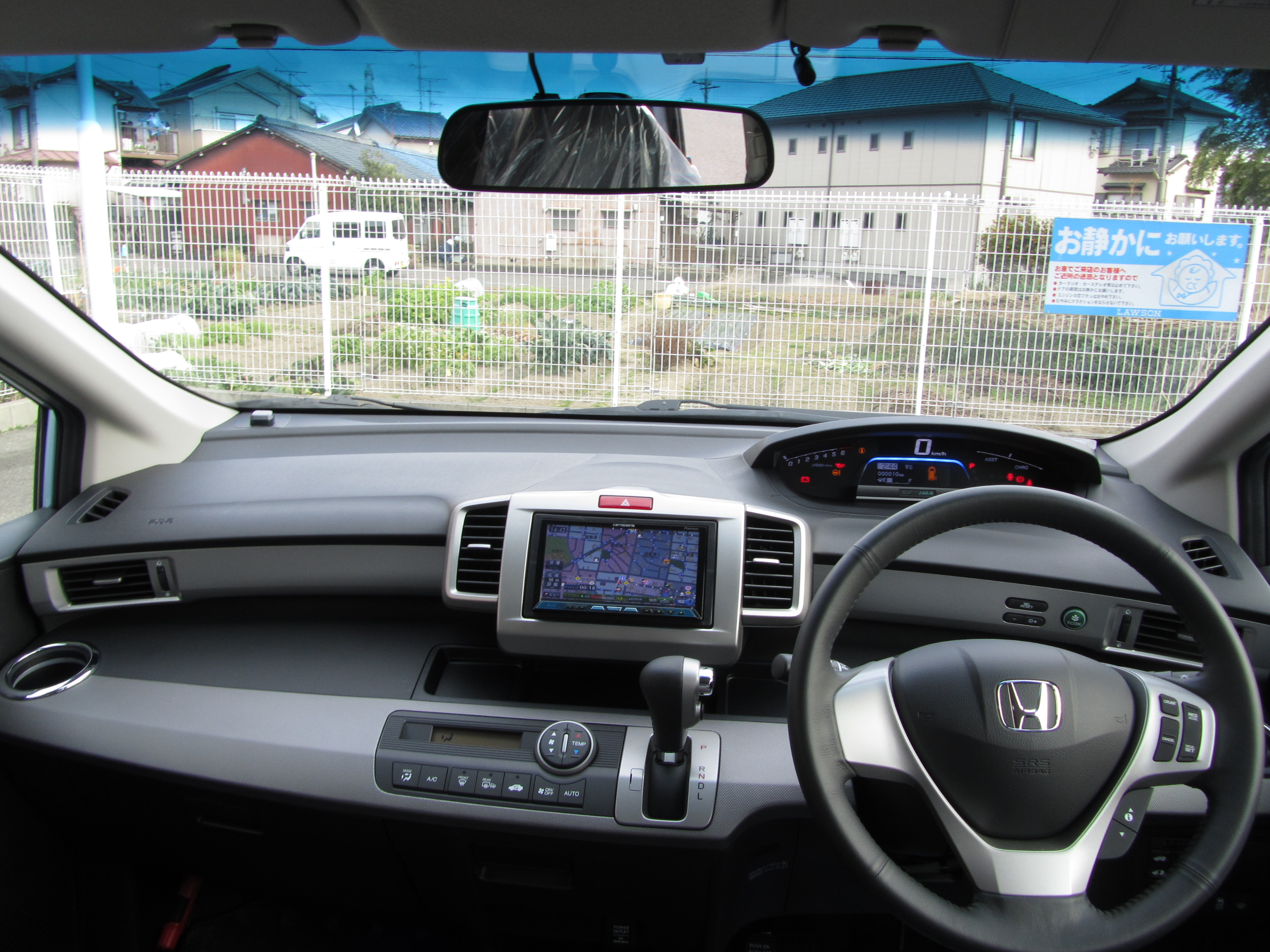
Freed Hybrid Interior (facelift)

==== Freed Spike ====
In 2010, Honda released the 'soul twinbrother' of Freed called Freed Spike for Japanese markets only. Honda said that this car is a "compact multi-wagon" for the people with "active lifestyle."

This car features a whole different grille, headlamps and front fascia; a covered third side window, partially covered tail lights and new alloy wheels. Inside, apart from the familiarly similar dashboard to Freed, it has a dual height floor in the cargo area and some additional storage areas on the side panels.

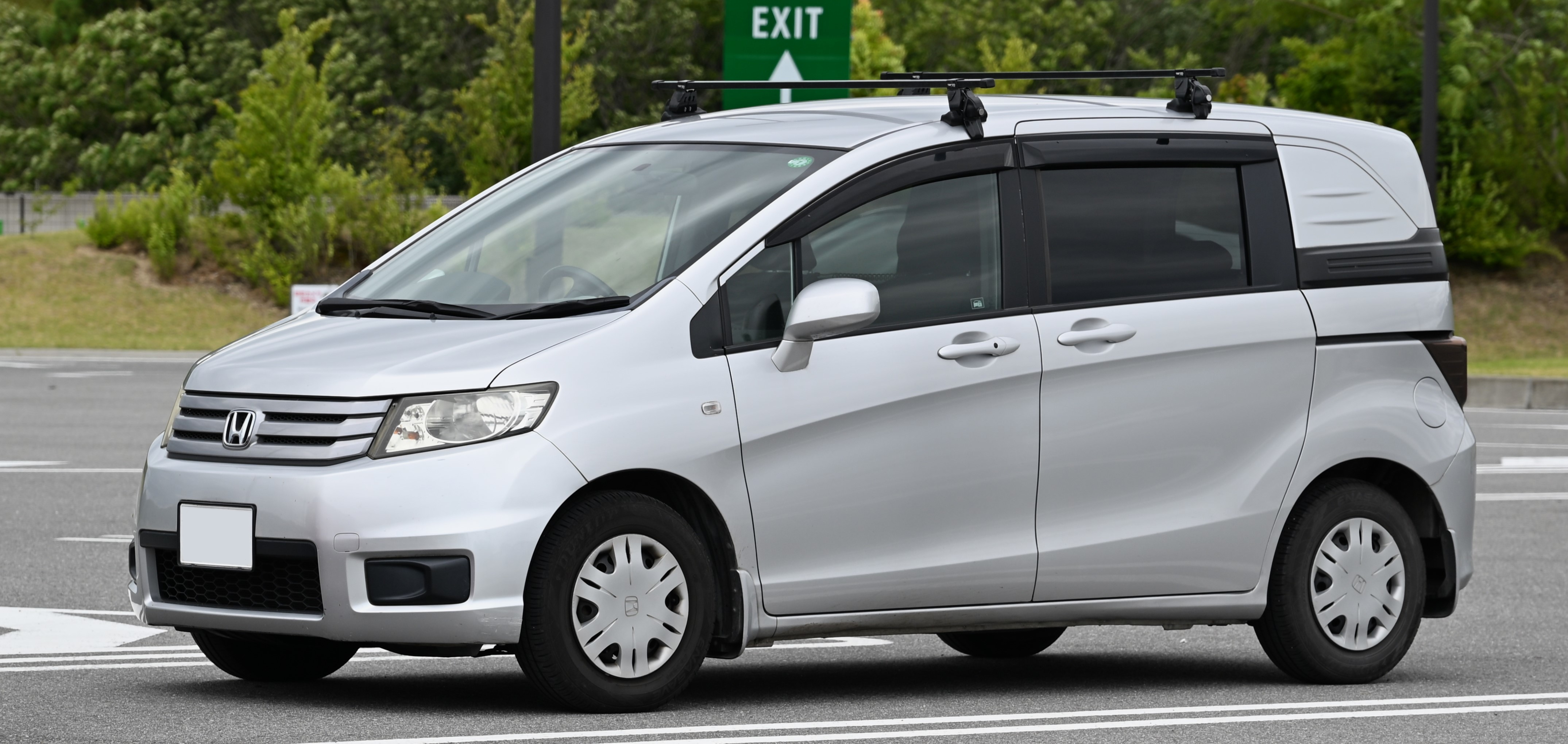
Freed Spike

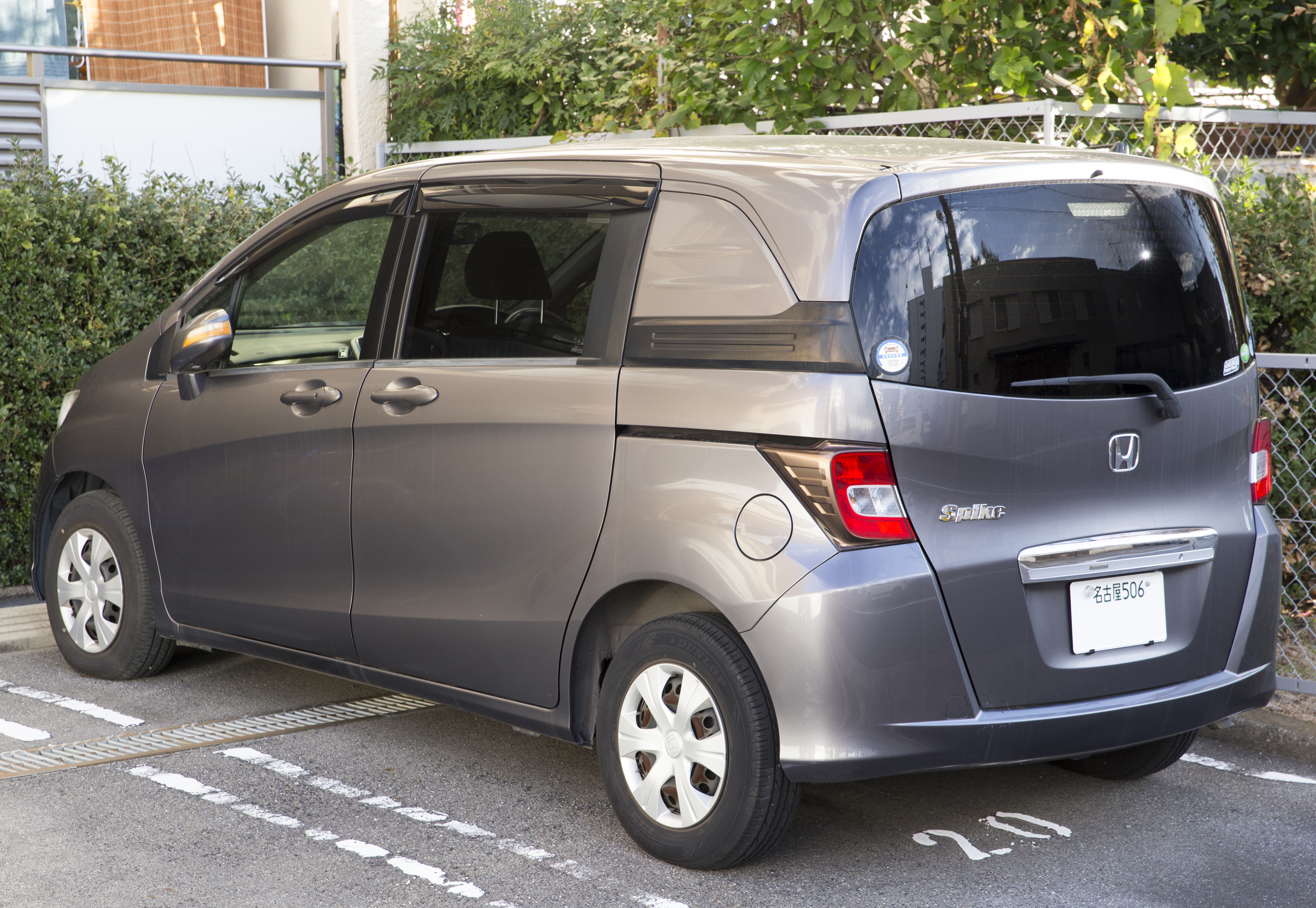
Freed Spike

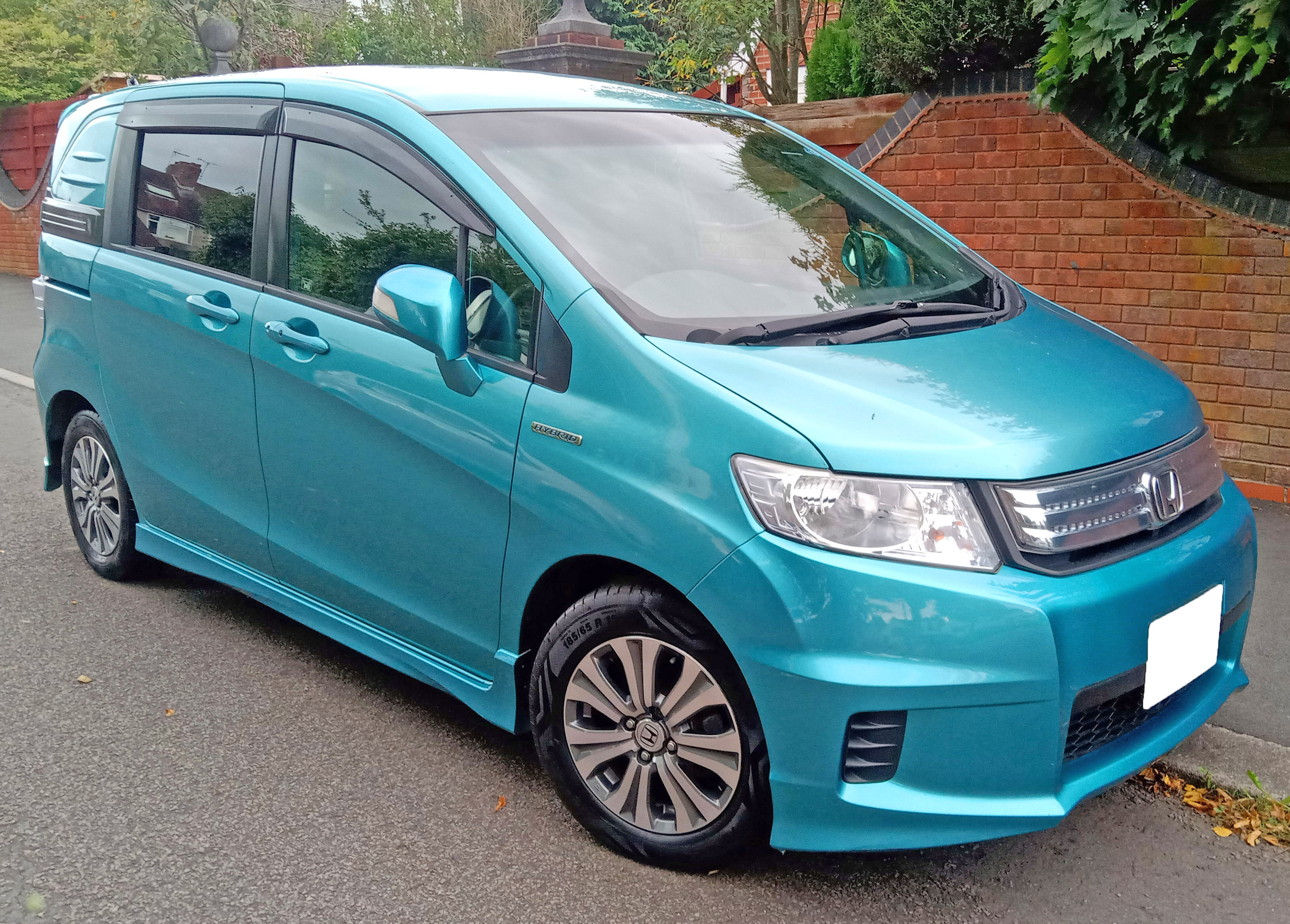
Freed Spike Hybrid

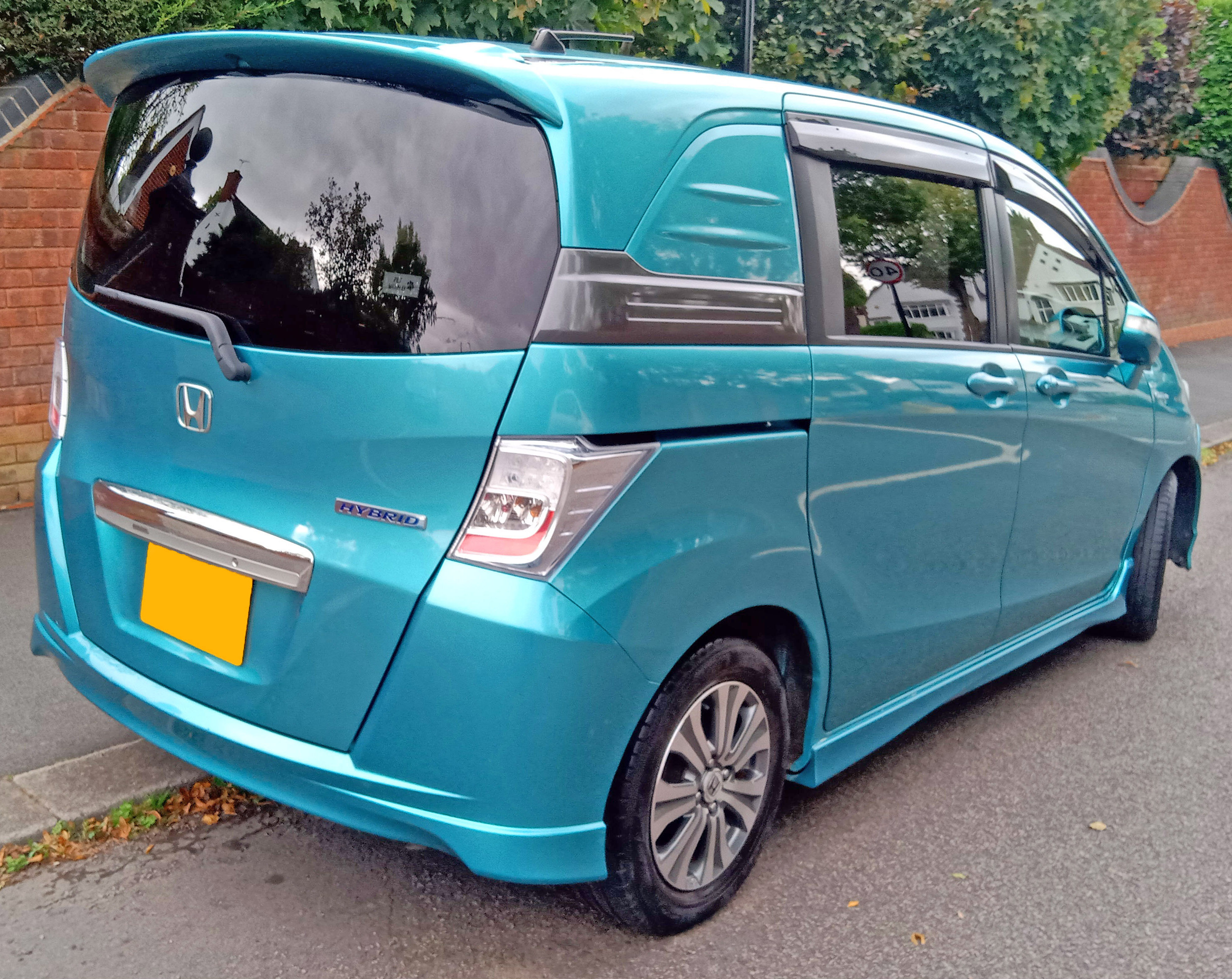
Freed Spike Hybrid

=== Indonesia ===
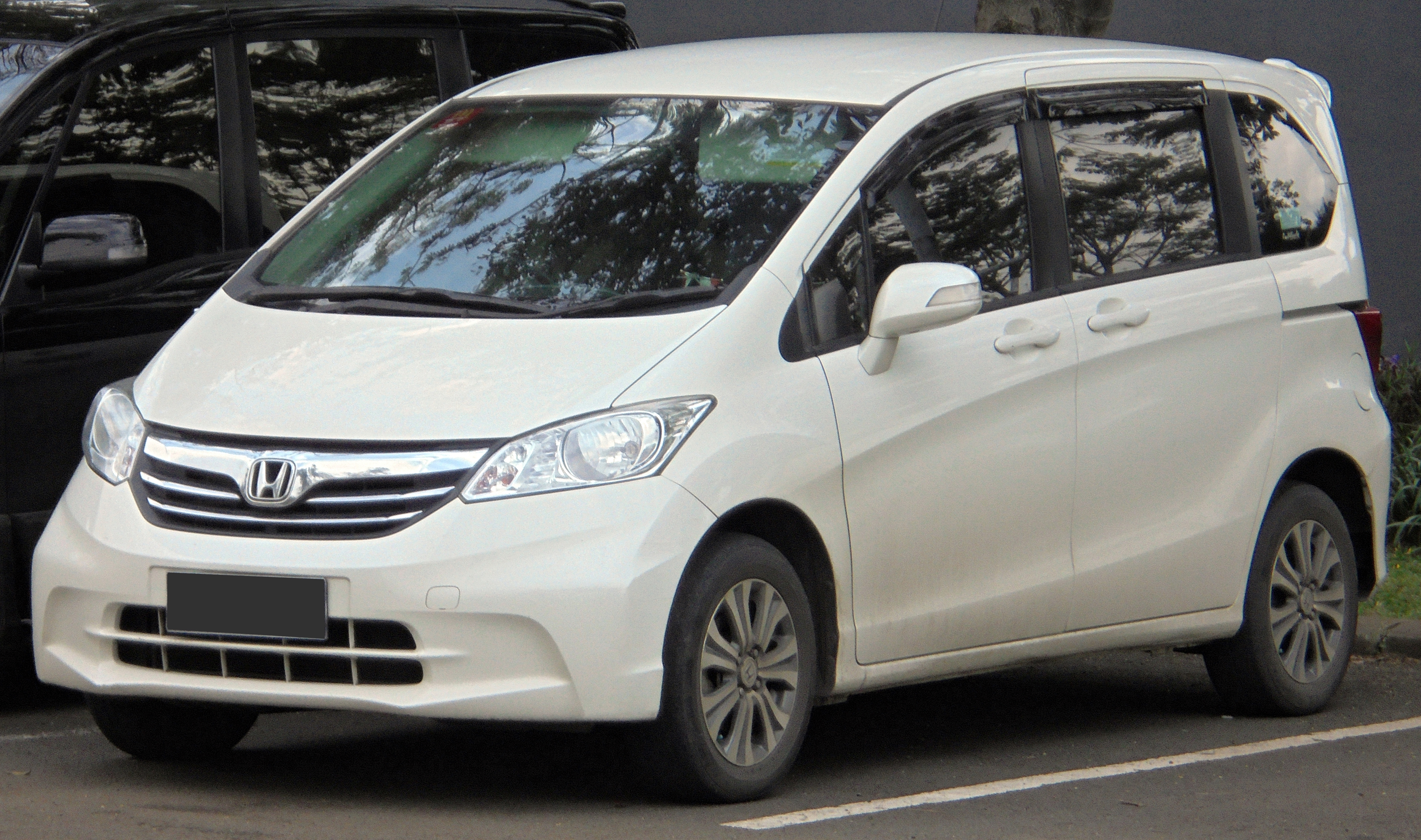
Freed S (Indonesia; first facelift)

On 29 June 2009, the first generation Freed was launched in Indonesia, the second country where the Freed was released after Japan. It was assembled at Honda Prospect Motor's Karawang plant and exported to other Southeast Asian markets. The Freed's ground clearance is 20 mm higher. For the Indonesian market, the Freed uses the 7-seater layout and a 5-speed automatic transmission instead of CVT in the Japanese domestic market version.

The Freed for the Indonesian market consists of three trim levels, the A, S and E. It received a facelift on 8 May 2012, adding a new grille, taillights, and new interior. It also received an improvement on 20 March 2013, adding a double blower AC for the S and E trim. The E trim comes with anti pinch function on both sliding doors, retractable door mirror with turning lamps and double DIN audio monitor with iPod/iPhone compatible.

The second facelift model was introduced at IIMS 2014. with the addition of three wide horizontal lines front grille (similar to the first facelift JDM 2011 Freed G Aero), silver accent on the sides of the stop lamp and cruise control for the E trim before it was discontinued due to poor sales figure.

The Indonesia-spec Freed was discontinued in June 2016, following a decline in sales.

=== Thailand ===
In 2010, the Freed was launched in Thailand. It was imported from Indonesia. It was only available in four trim levels (S, E, E Sport and E Sport NAVI).

=== Malaysia ===
On 22 April 2010, the Freed was launched in Malaysia. It was only available in one trim level (Grade E). Honda Malaysia's target sales were 1,200 units a year.

In July 2012, Honda Malaysia added an affordable variant of the Honda Freed called the Grade S. Features omitted from the Grade E were the powered sliding rear doors with remote operation, automatic air conditioning, indicators for the side mirrors or intermittent wipers, tail spoiler, and the Alpine DVD player.

In January 2013, Honda Malaysia launched the facelifted model to Malaysia. Like before, it was available in two trim levels (Grade E and Grade S). The Grade E model gained some extra features which included leather seats, and fold-down armrests for both front seats are now available across the board (previously only the driver and two mid-row chairs had armrests).

=== Hong Kong ===
On 23 January 2011, the Freed was officially launched in Hong Kong. Unlike other non-Japanese market models, all Freeds sold in Hong Kong are manufactured in Japan and seats 6 passengers.

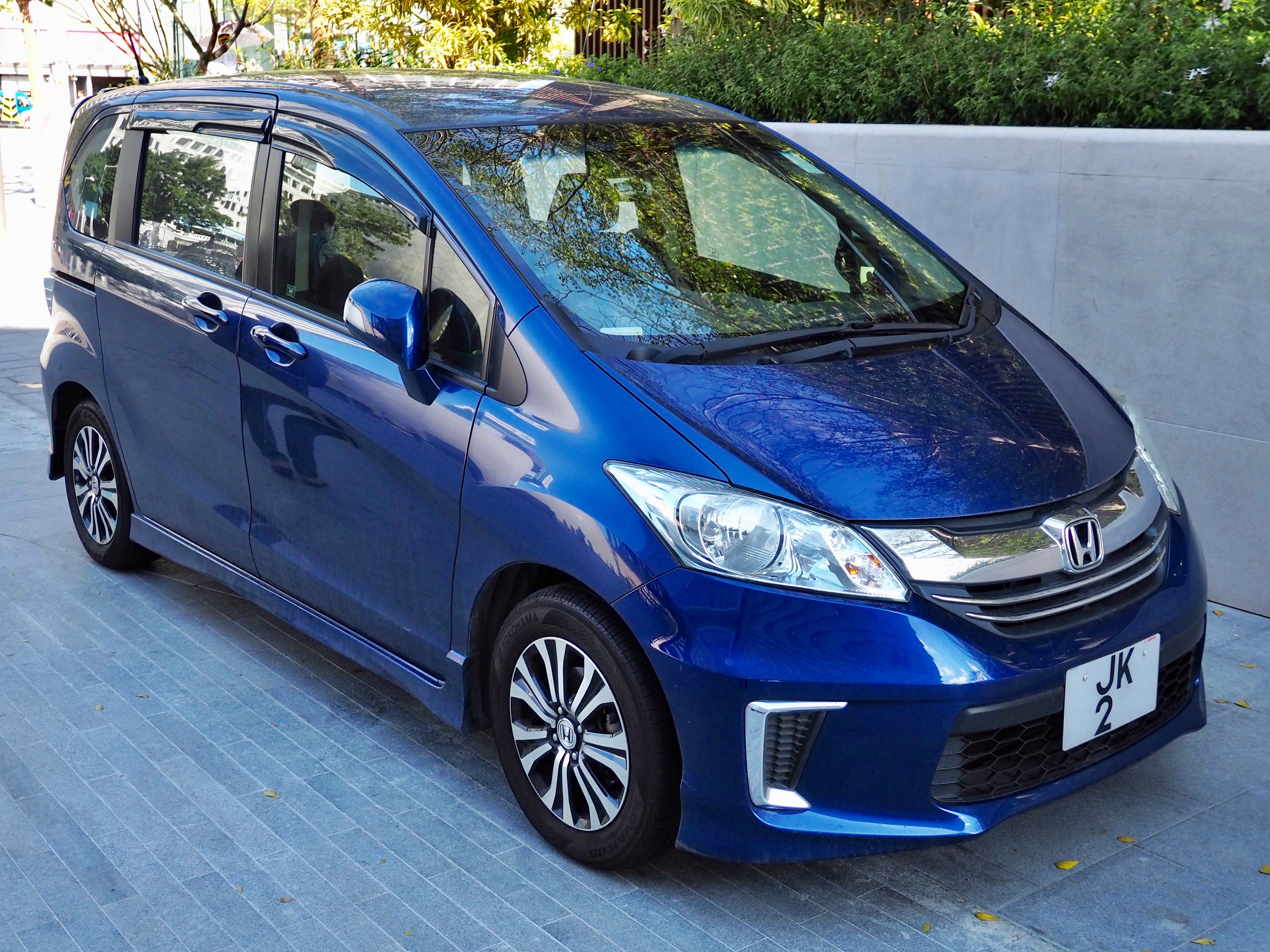
Freed Hybrid (Hong Kong; second facelift)

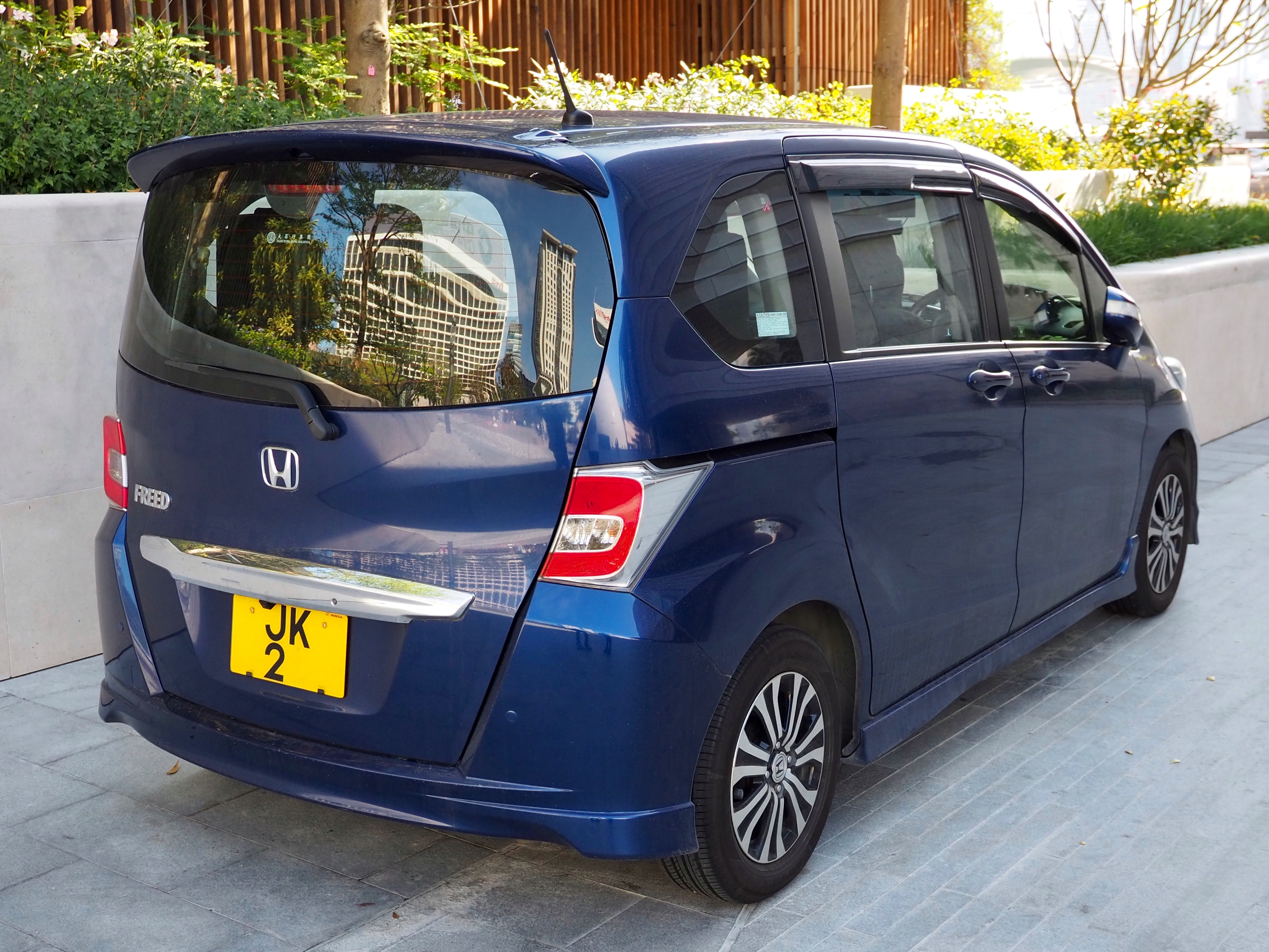
Freed Hybrid (Hong Kong; second facelift)

=== Singapore ===
In Singapore, the Freed is available through parallel import distributors.

== Second generation (GB5/GB6/GB7/GB8; 2016) ==
Second generation
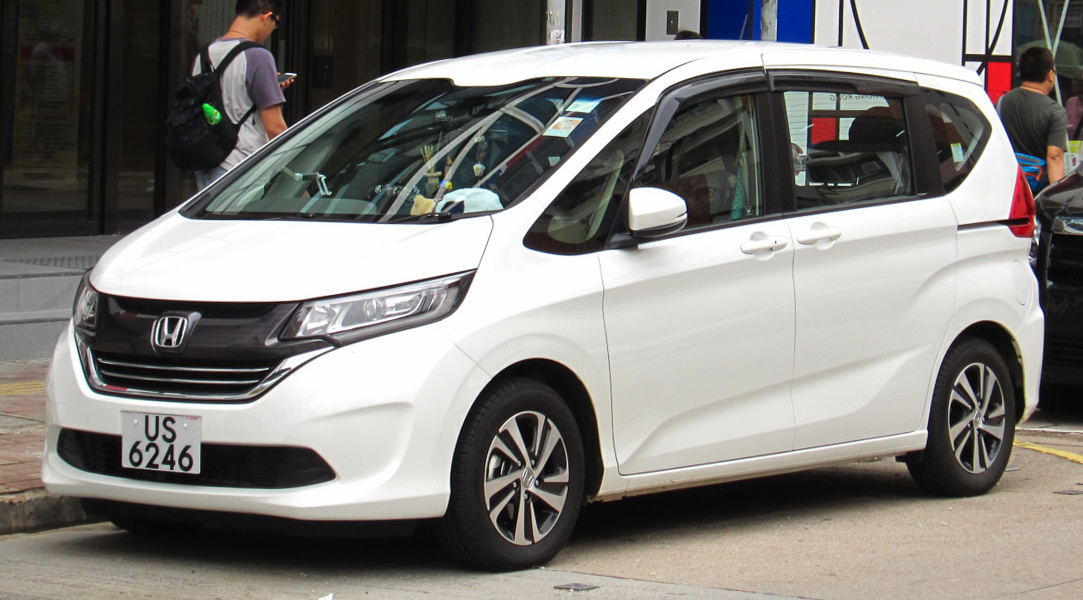
- Freed (GB5; pre-facelift, Hong Kong)

Overview
- Model code: GB5; GB6; GB7; GB8
- Production: September 2016– June 2024
- Assembly: Japan: Sayama, Saitama (Sayama Plant)

Body and chassis
- Layout: Front-engine, front-wheel-drive Front-engine, four-wheel-drive
- Related: Honda Fit/Jazz (third generation); Honda City/Ballade (sixth generation); Honda Vezel/HR-V (second generation)

Powertrain
- Engine: 1.5 L L15B1 DOHC Earth Dreams i-VTEC I4; 1.5 L LEB DOHC (Hybrid) I4
- Transmission: 7-speed automatic (Hybrid); CVT
- Hybrid drivetrain: Parallel hybrid

Dimensions
- Wheelbase: 2,740 mm (107.9 in)
- Length: 4,265–4,295 mm (167.9–169.1 in)
- Width: 1,695 mm (66.7 in)
- Height: 1,710–1,735 mm (67.3–68.3 in)
- Curb weight: 1,340–1,420 kg (2,954–3,131 lb)

The second generation Freed was revealed in June 2016 and released in Japan on 16 September 2016.

The second generation Freed is conceived based on the "Dynamism and Functionality" theme, does not differ much in looks from its curvier predecessor. Apart from the updated grille and lights, the new Freed retains the rear sliding doors with some minor improvements. Its marketing campaign heavily used Happy by Pharrell Williams.

It is also offered in five-seater option as the Freed+, which replaced the Freed Spike in the previous generation.

On 15 December 2017, the Freed Modulo X was released in Japan. It featured a full body kit, front and rear bumpers, side skirts, and a tailgate spoiler.

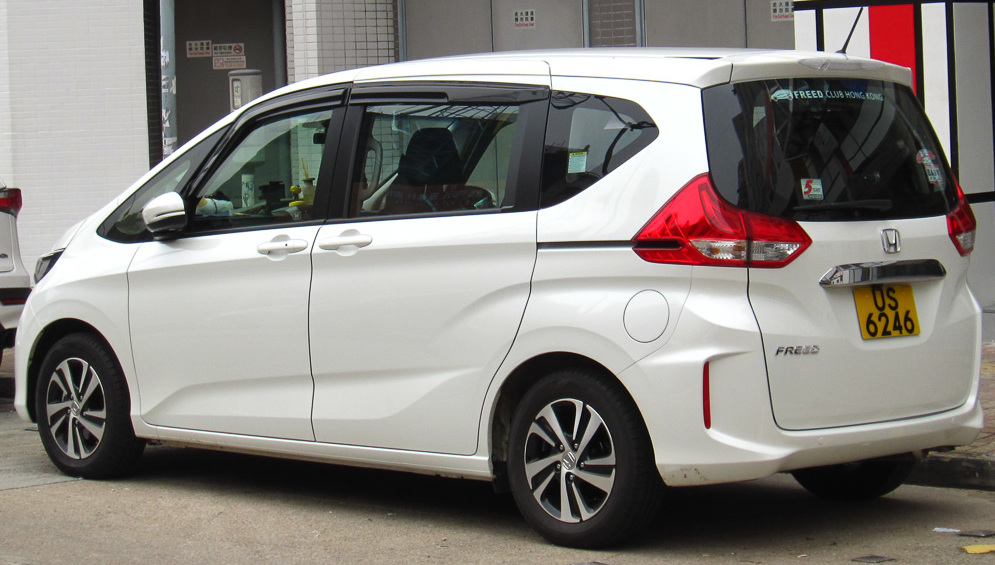
Freed (GB5; pre-facelift, Hong Kong)

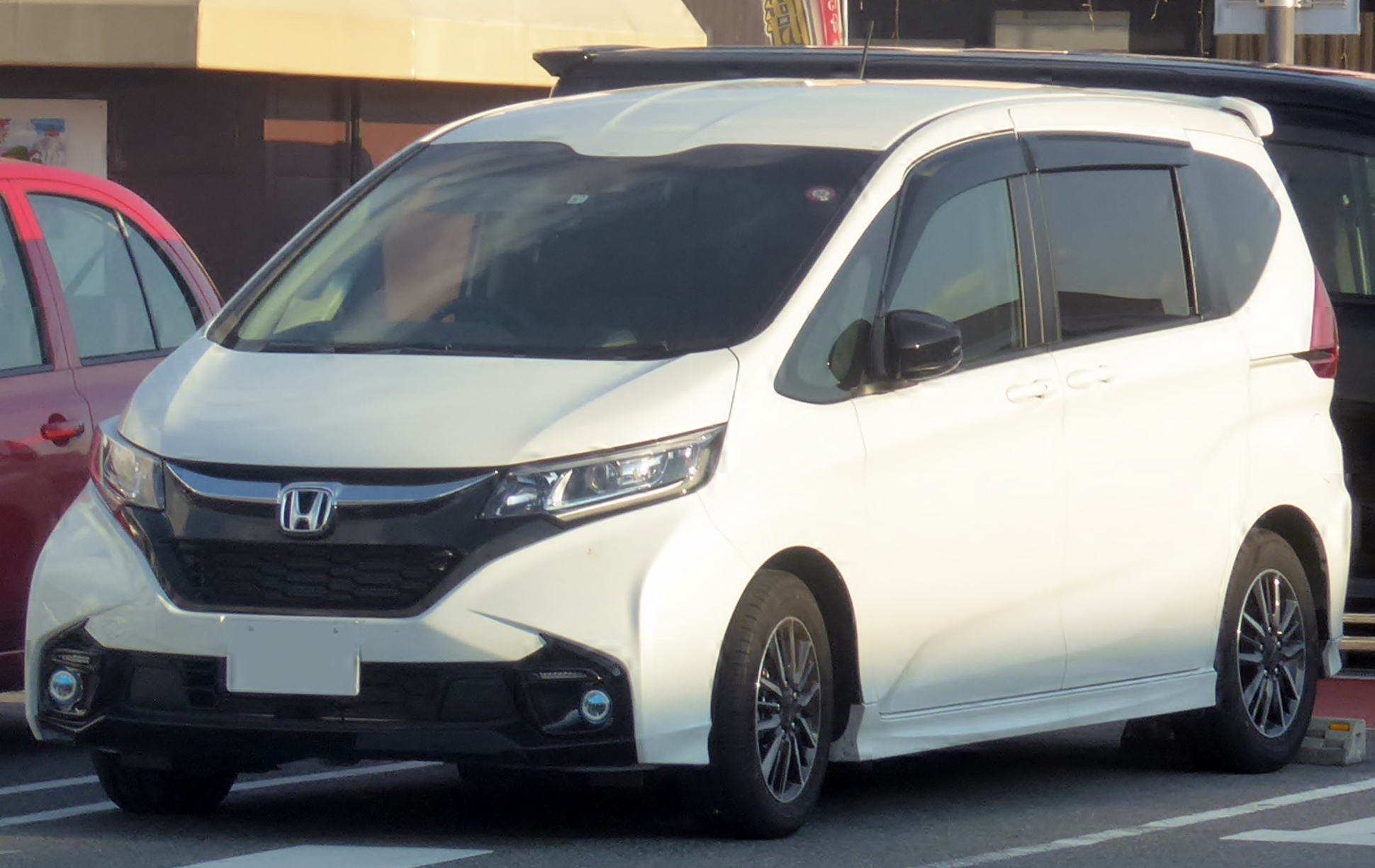
Freed Modulo X (GB5; pre-facelift, Japan)

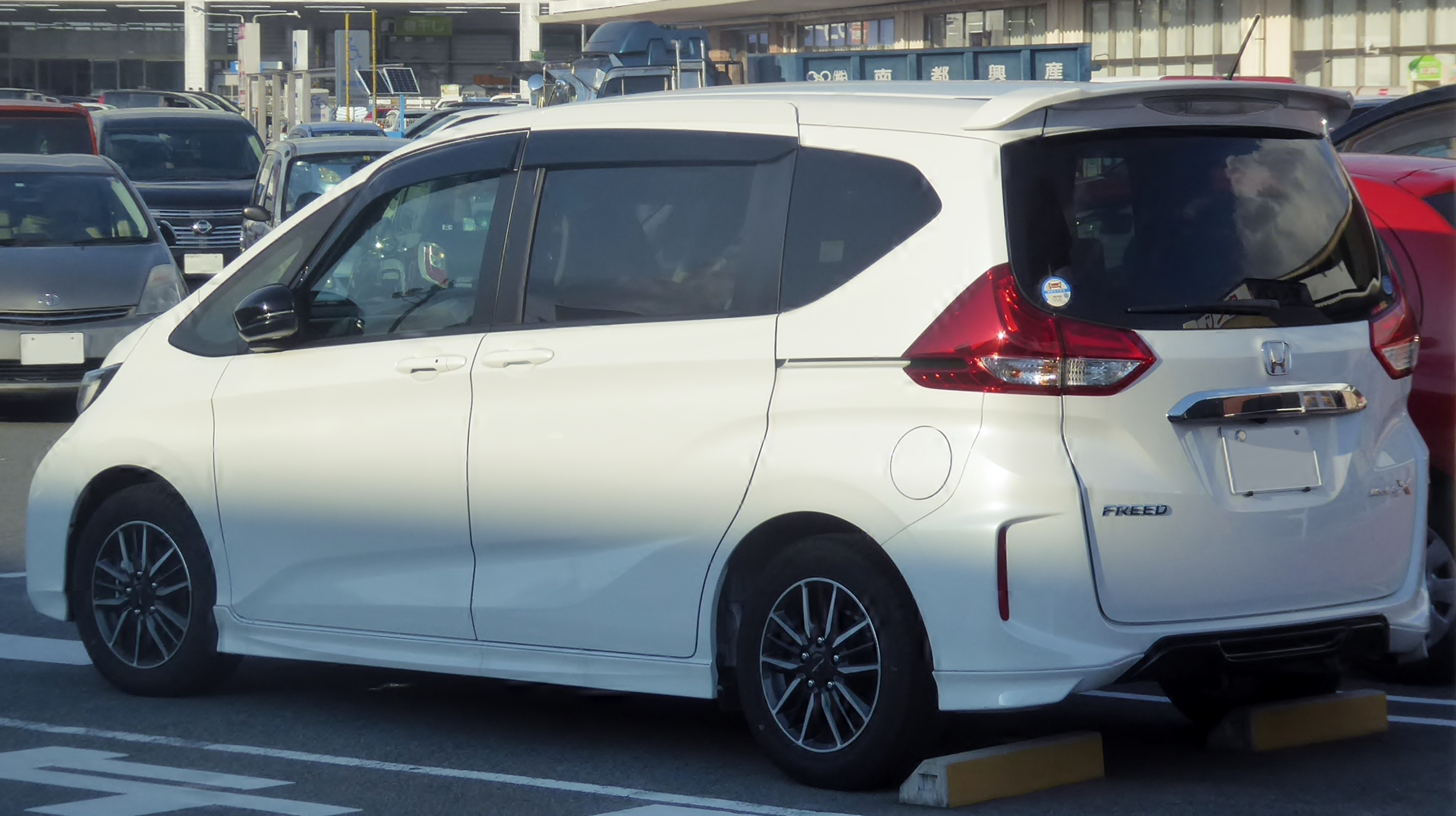
Freed Modulo X (GB5; pre-facelift, Japan)

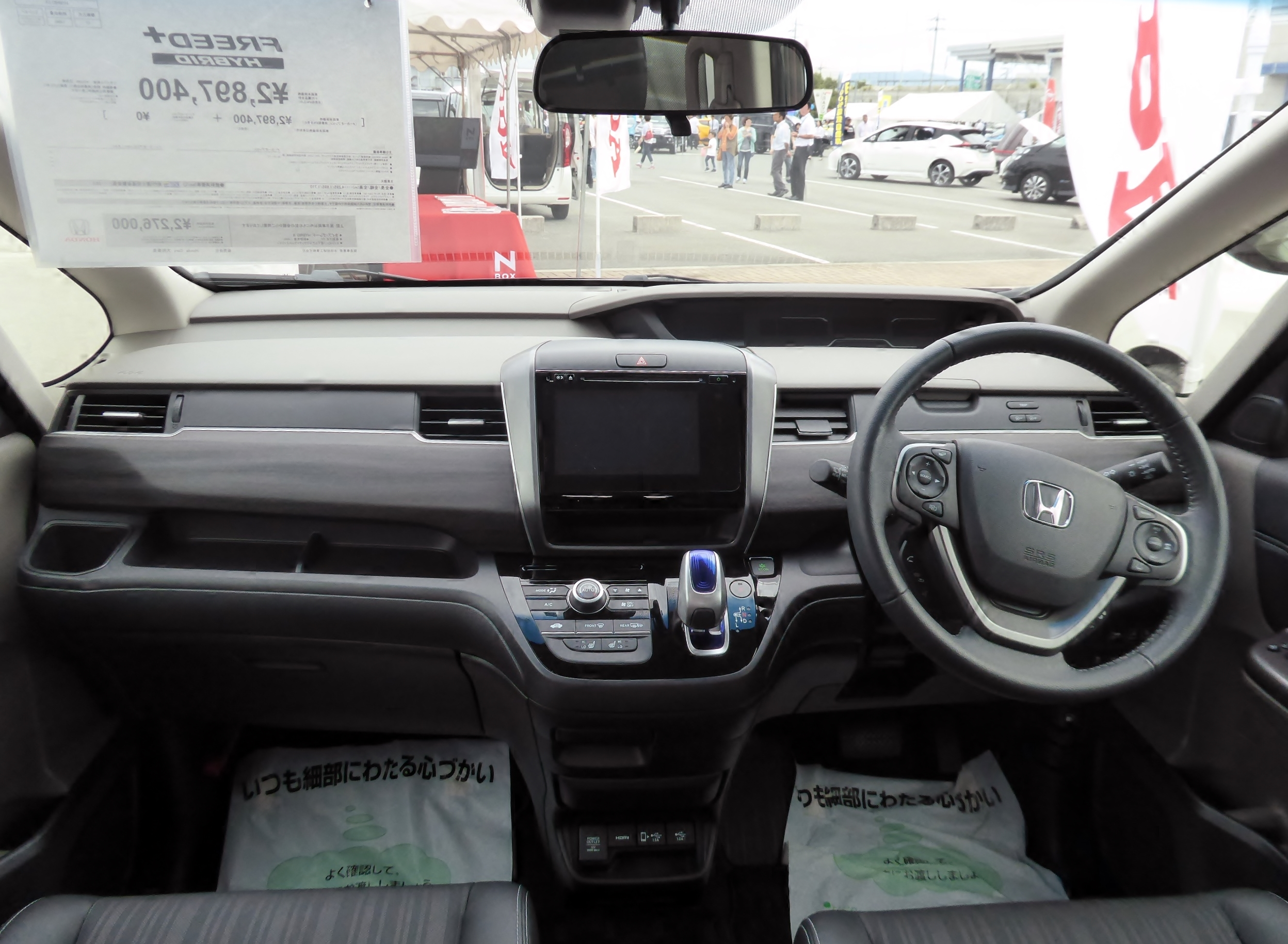
Freed+ Hybrid EX interior (Japan)

=== Facelift ===
The second generation Freed received its facelift and was released on 18 October 2019, as announced on 30 August 2019. The frontal section has been revised with an angular edged body coloured grille similar to the new Fit along with redesigned foglamps. In its interior, it uses a lighter trimming on the dashboard panel. Together with this facelift, the crossover SUV-inspired variant of the Freed, called Freed Crosstar, was added.

The facelifted second generation Freed went on sale in Singapore in early August 2022 through Honda's official distributor Kah Motor and was imported from Japan. It is available in two trim levels (S7 and E7). The Freed Hybrid is also available in Singapore through parallel import distributors.

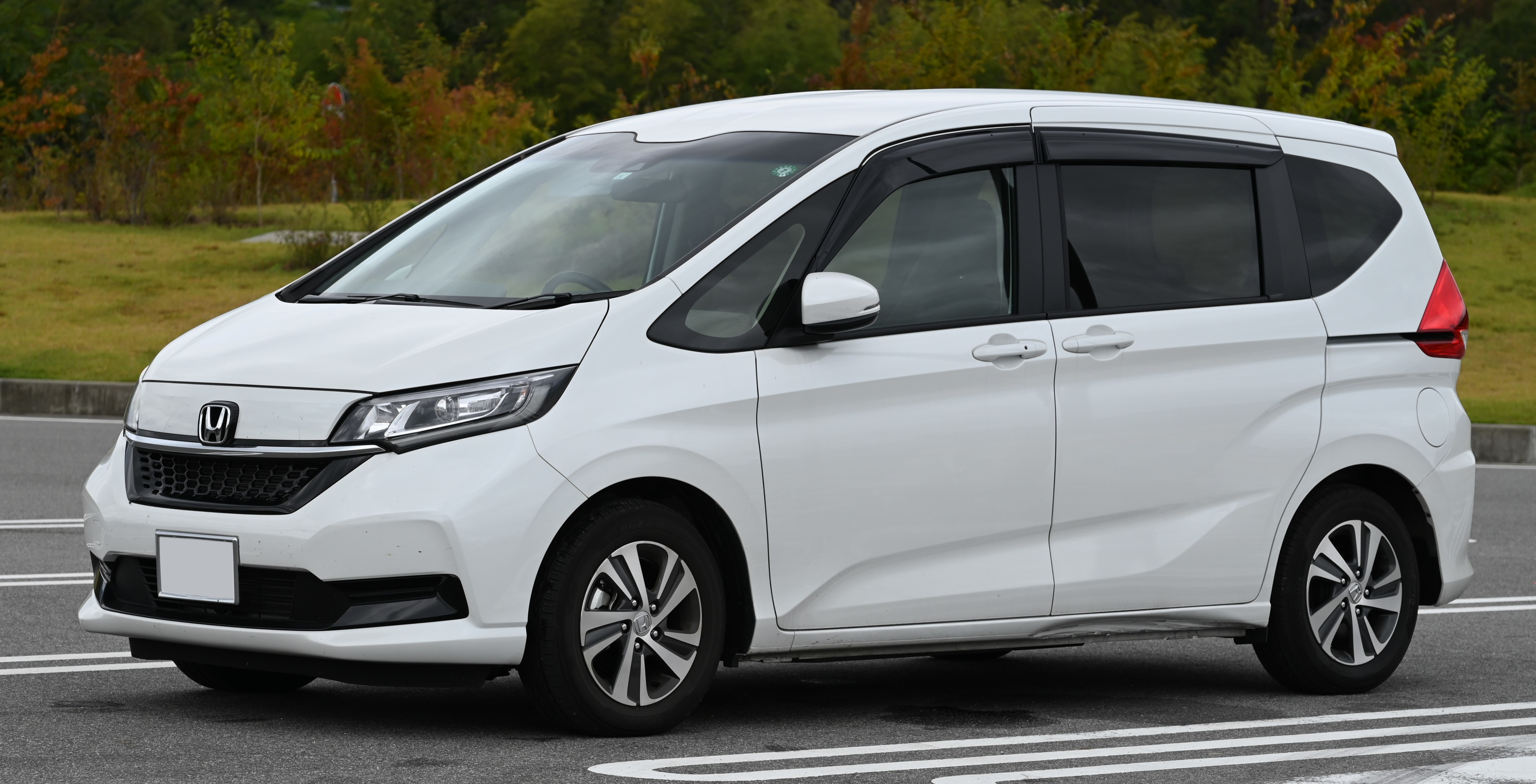
Freed+ Hybrid G (GB7; facelift, Japan)

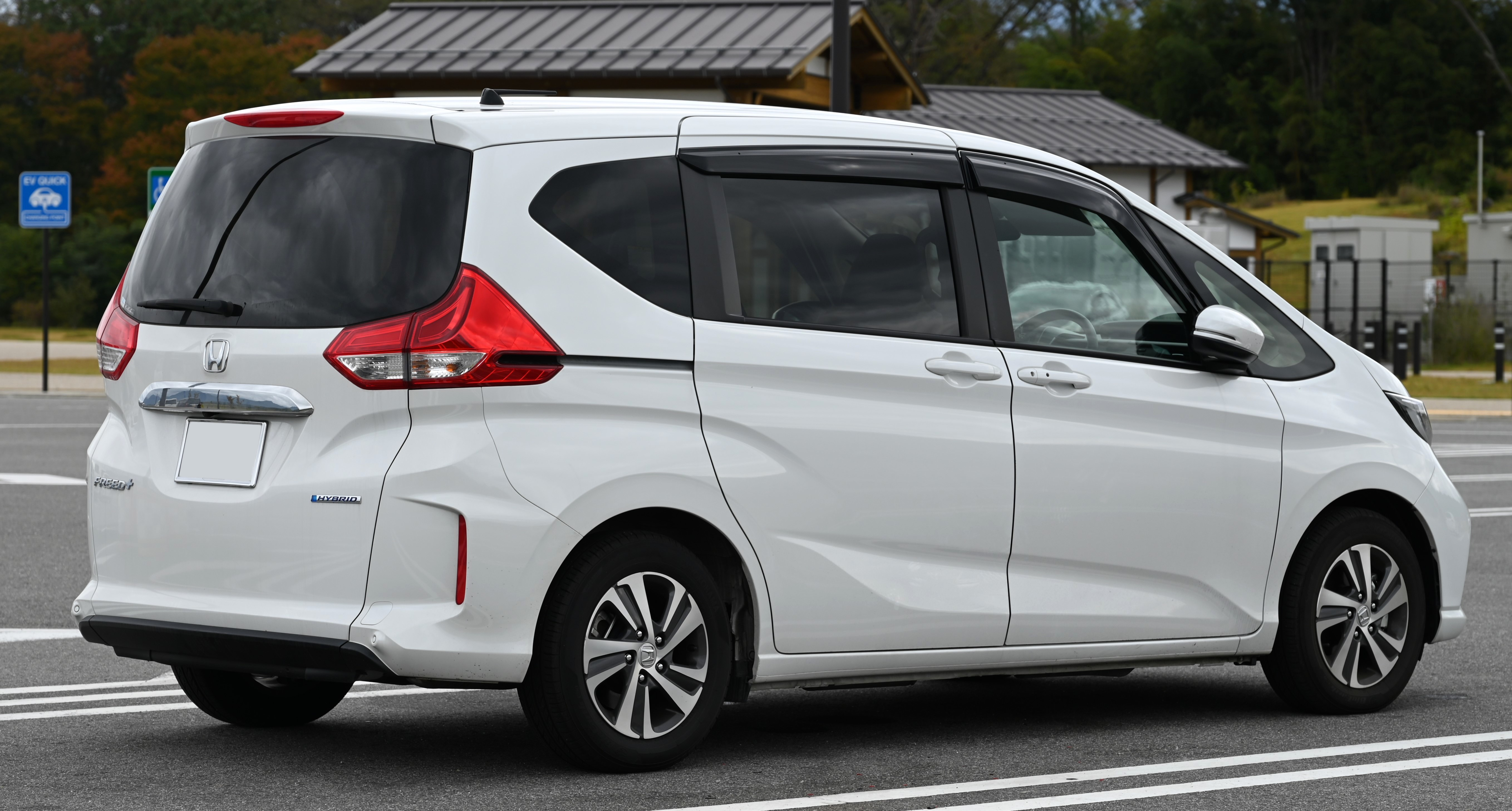
Freed+ Hybrid G (GB7; facelift, Japan)

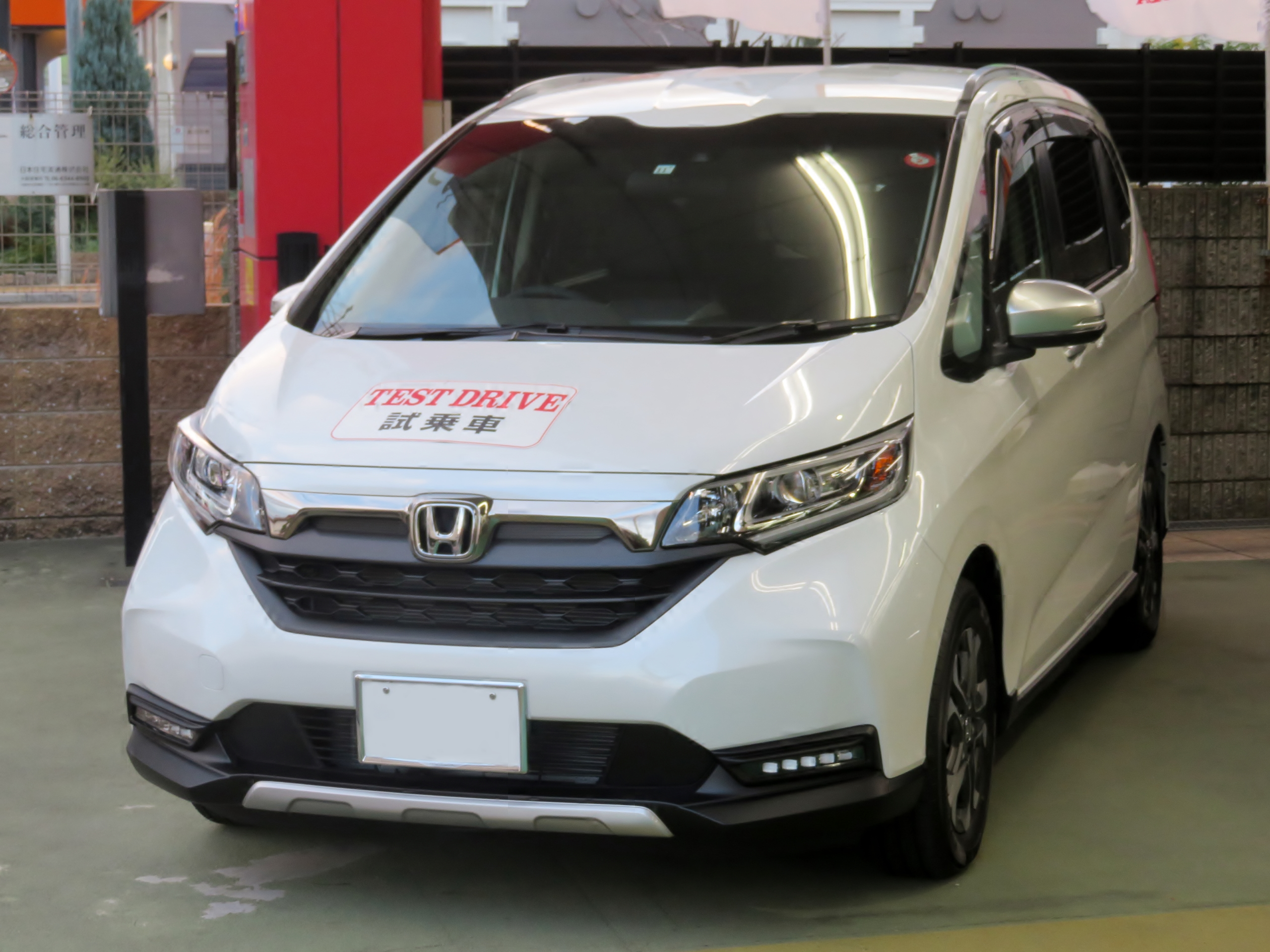
Freed+ Crosstar (GB5; facelift, Japan)

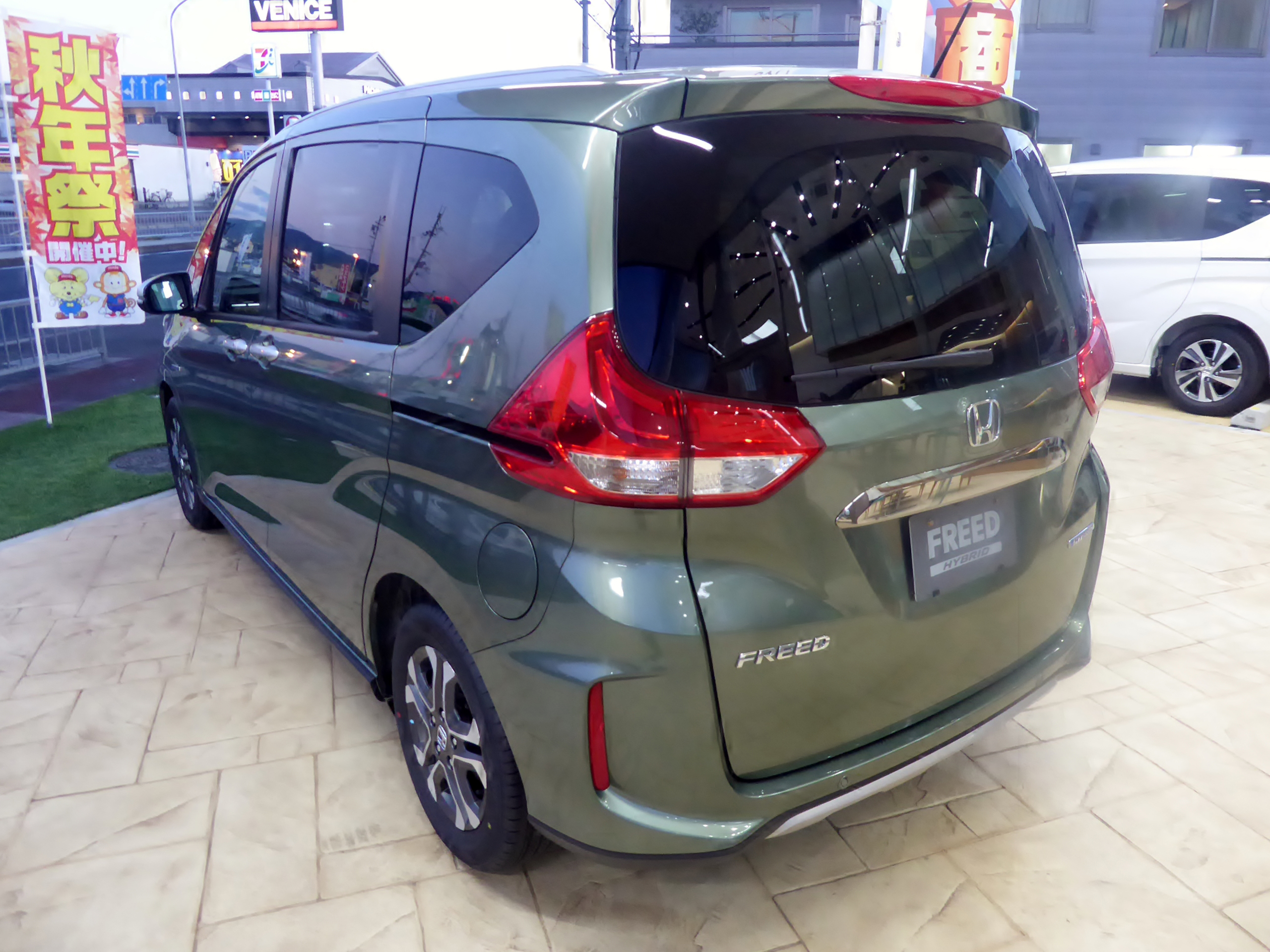
Freed Hybrid Crosstar (GB7; facelift, Japan)

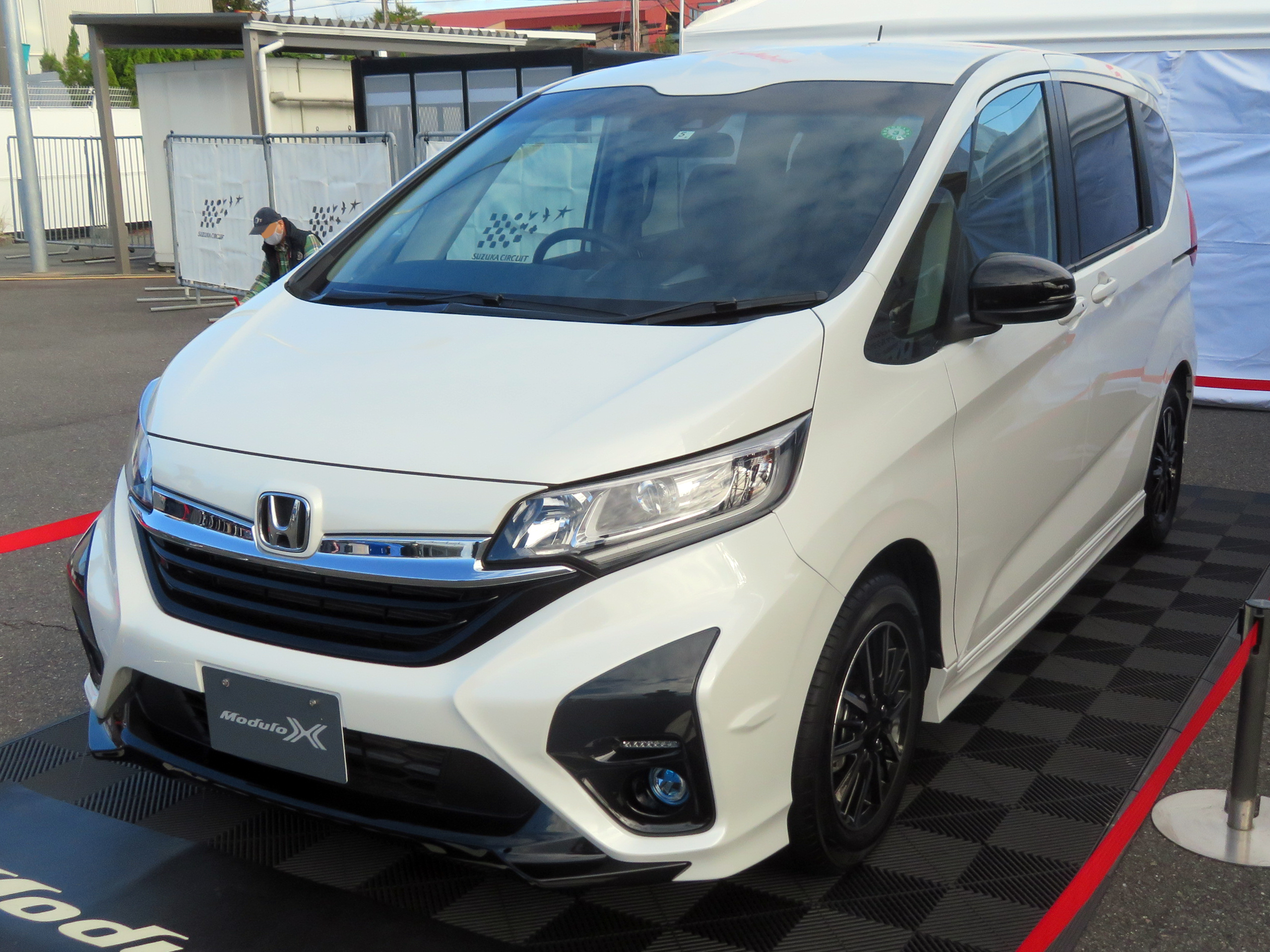
Freed Modulo X (GB5; facelift, Japan)

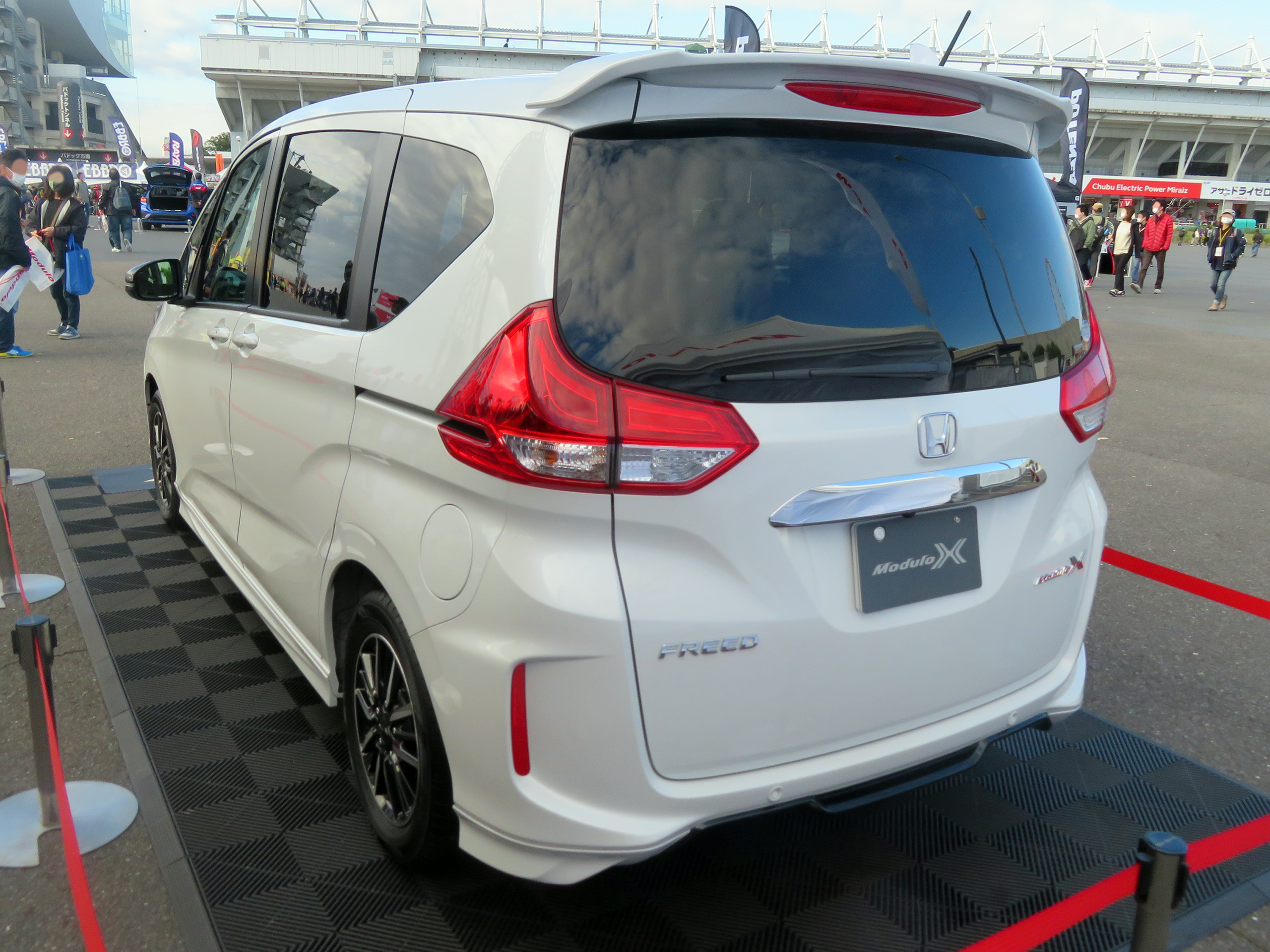
Freed Modulo X (GB5; facelift, Japan)

== Third generation (GT; 2024) ==
Third generation
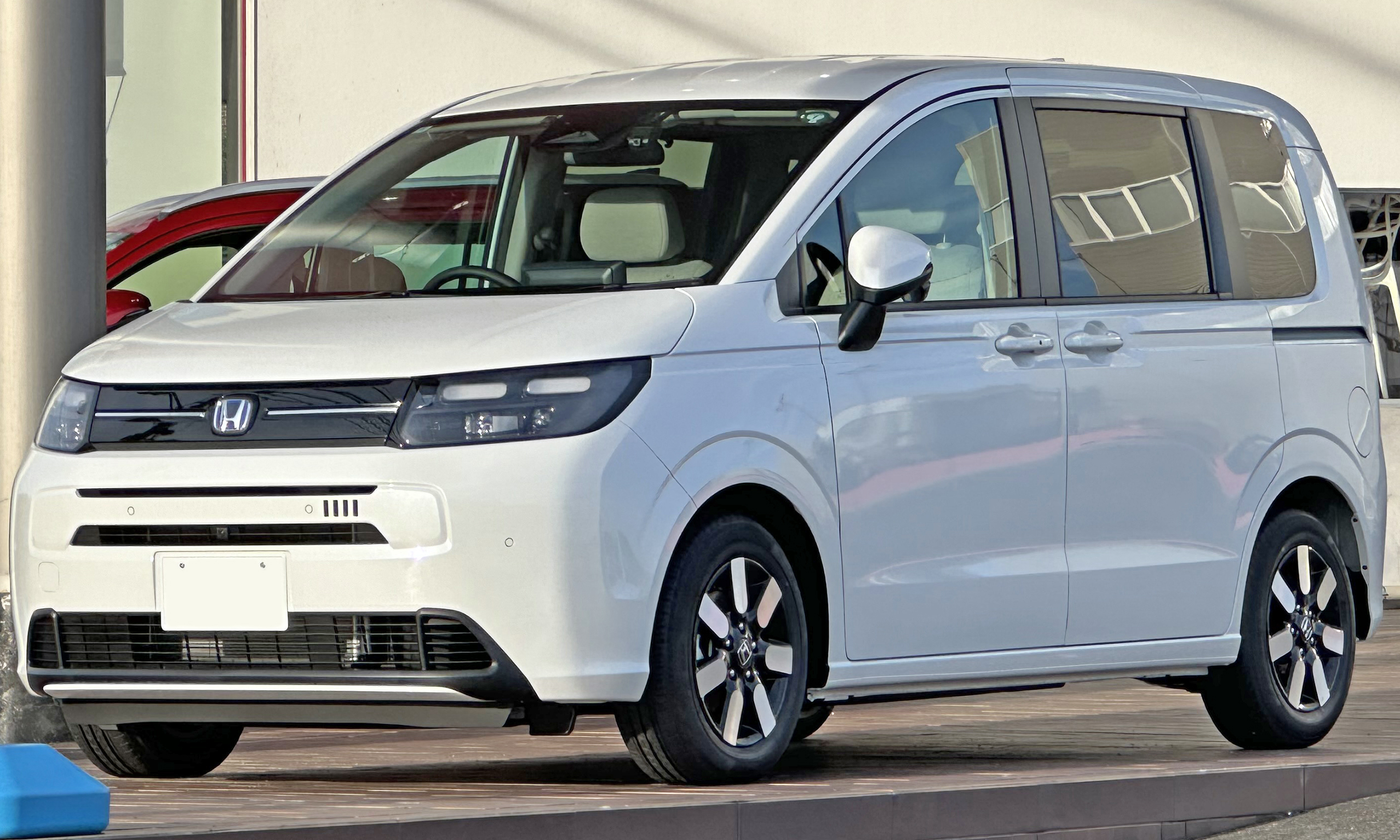
- Freed Air e:HEV (GT6)

Overview
- Model code: GT1; GT2; GT3; GT4; GT5; GT6; GT7; GT8
- Production: 2024–present
- Assembly: Japan: Yorii, Saitama

Body and chassis
- Layout: Front-engine, front-wheel-drive Front-engine, four-wheel-drive
- Related: Honda Fit (fourth generation); Honda Vezel (second generation)

Powertrain
- Hybrid drivetrain: Power-split (e:HEV)

Dimensions
- Wheelbase: 2,740 mm (107.9 in)
- Length: 4,310 mm (169.7 in)
- Width: 1,695 mm (66.7 in)
- Height: 1,755 mm (69.1 in)

The third generation Freed was revealed on 9 May 2024 and released in Japan on 28 June 2024. It is available with either a conventional petrol or self-charging e:HEV hybrid powertrains.

The Freed comes in two versions: the Air with a high-quality and simplified design, and a Crosstar with rugged crossover elements. The front and rear fascias are uncluttered as compared to its predecessor where all of the design elements are placed on the horizontal character line and borrows a few styling elements from the Stepwgn.

The interior features a larger free-standing infotainment display, a smaller digital instrument cluster, an enlarged storage area on the dashboard and roof mounted climate vents for the rear occupants.

For seating configurations, the Air comes with a three-row 6-seater and the Crosstar comes with a two-row 5-seater. The Crosstar version has a two-tone black and khaki interior colour, a utility side panel in the luggage compartment and a utility nut in the tailgate.

The Freed has won Japan Car of the Year in 2024–2025.

=== Markets ===
==== Brunei ====
The Freed was previewed in Brunei on 12 March 2026 in a sole variant powered by e:HEV petrol hybrid powertrain.

==== Singapore ====
The Freed was launched in Singapore on 29 November 2024, in two variants: HS7 and HE7, it is powered by the e:HEV petrol hybrid powertrain.

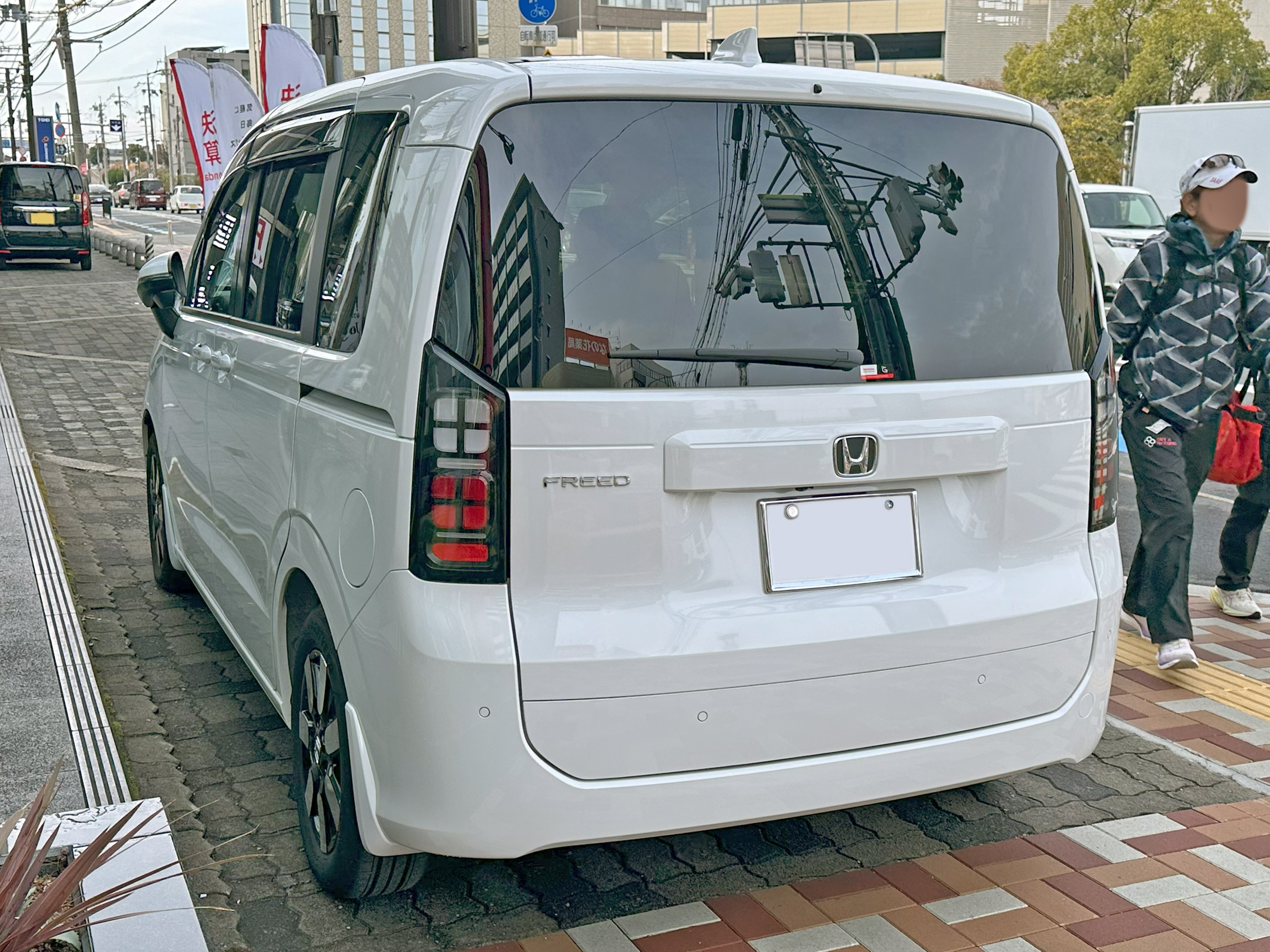
Freed Air EX (GT1) rear view

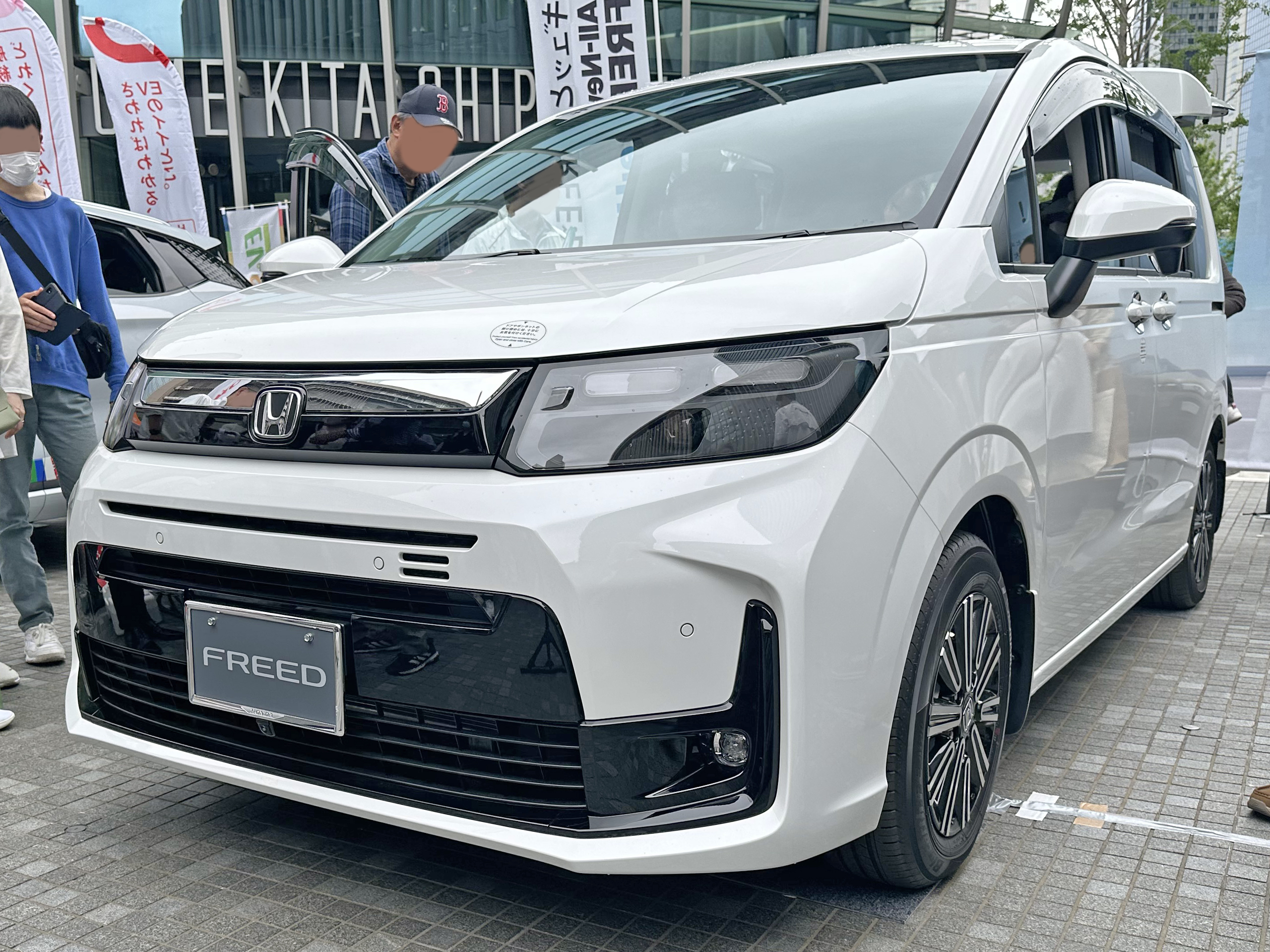
Freed Air (GT1) with Superior Style package

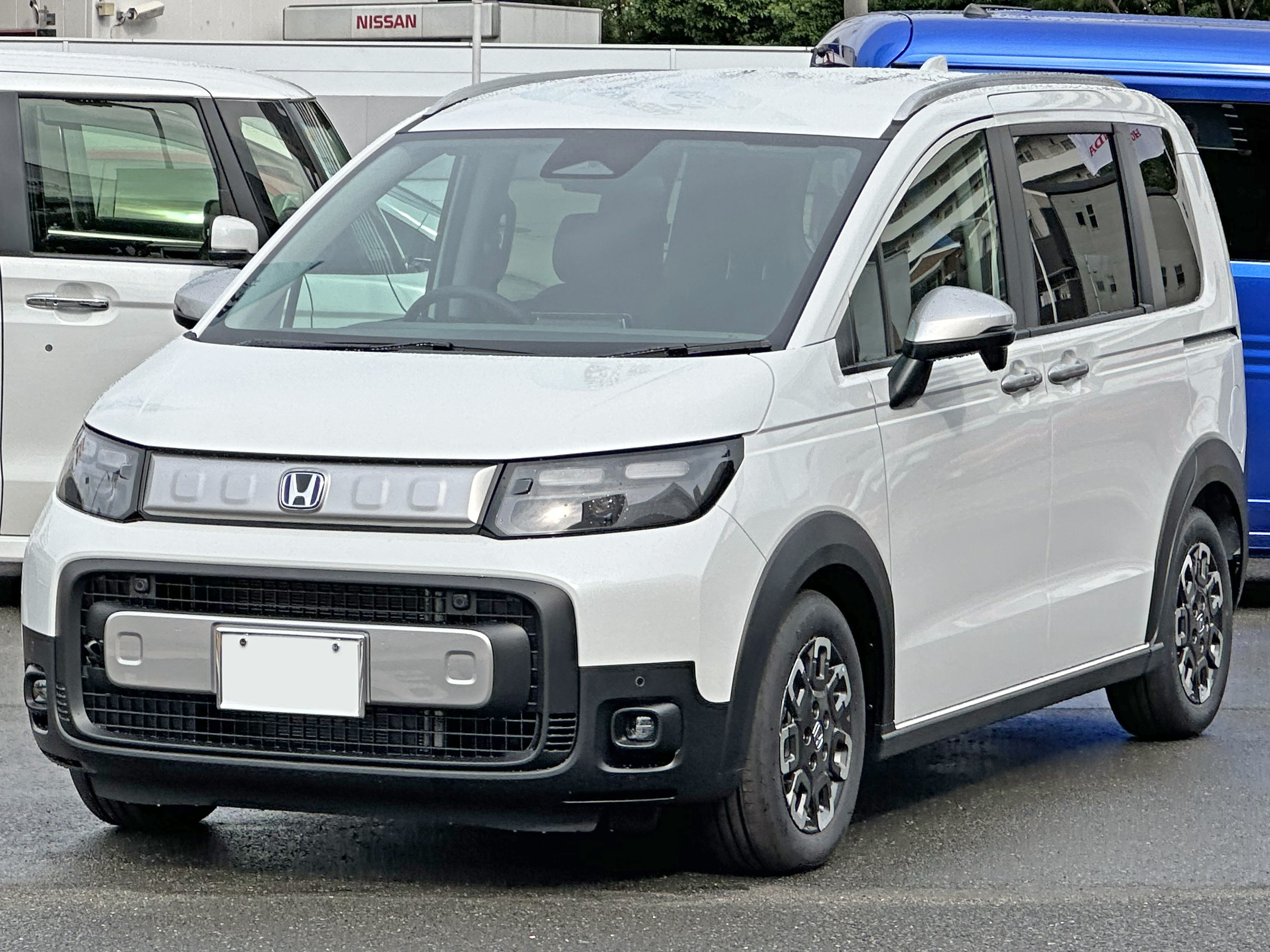
Freed Crosstar e:HEV (GT6)

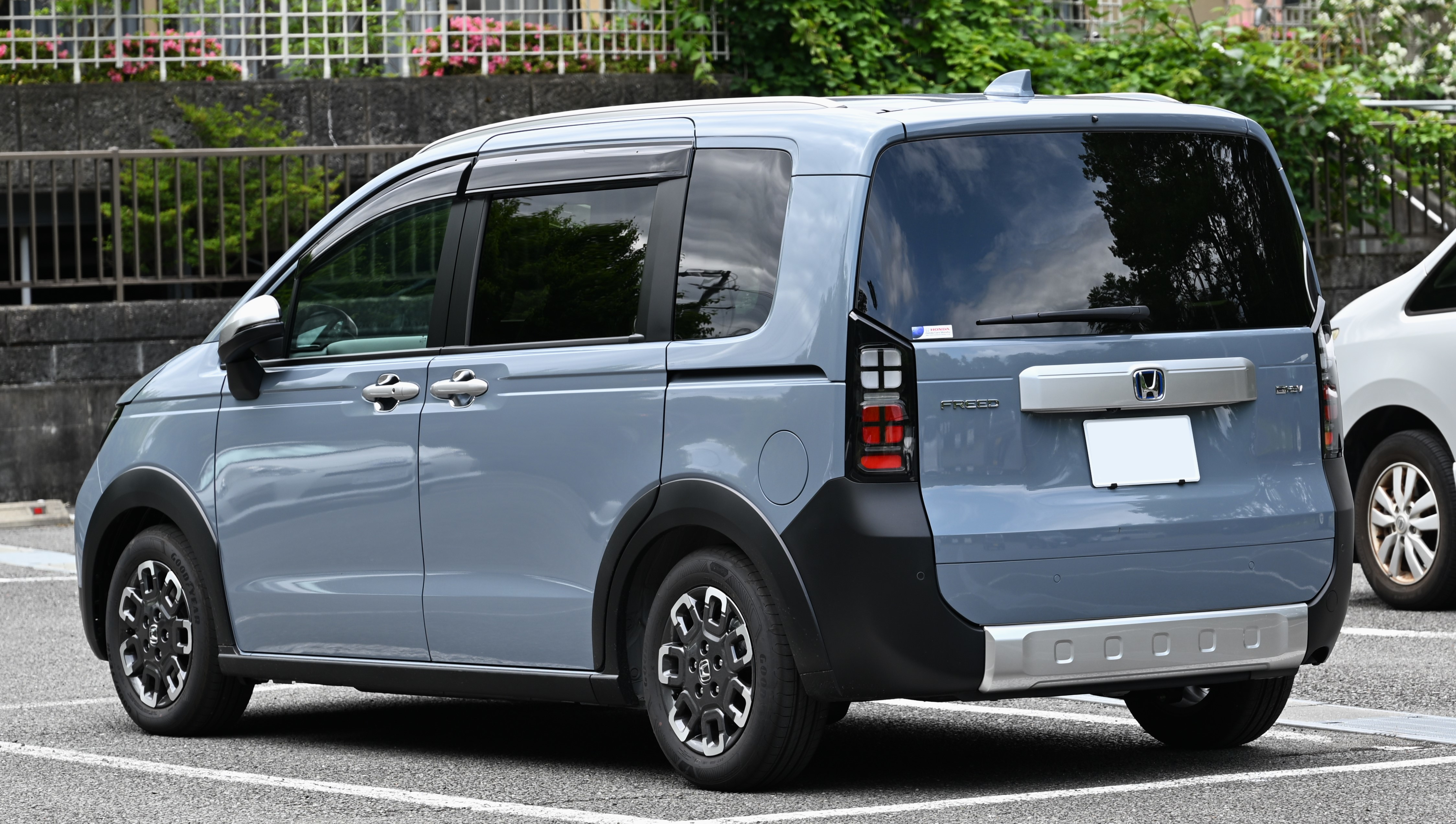
Freed Crosstar e:HEV rear view

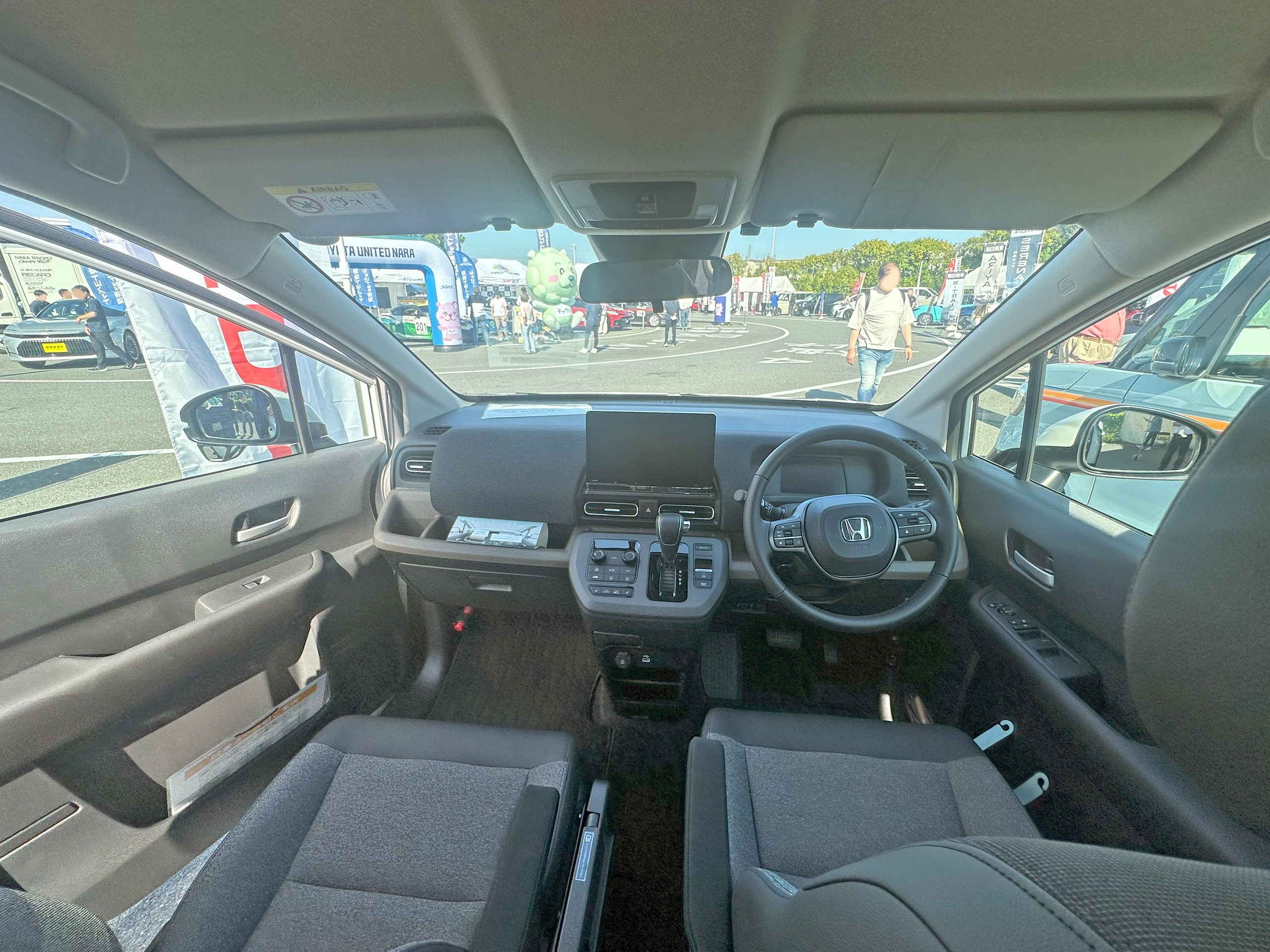
Interior

== Sales ==
Year	Japan	Indonesia	Thailand	Malaysia (Note: Figures based on registration (Malaysia))
2008	50,646			
2009	79,525	8,900		
2010	95,123	13,500		850
2011	67,736	10,112		590
2012	106,316	19,811		1,015
2013	76,818	18,595		367
2014	54,313	6,517	3,251	1
2015	41,091	3,288	788	
2016	52,202	617		
2017	104,405			
2018	84,121			
2019	85,596			
2020	76,283			
2021	69,577			
2022	79,525			
2023	77,562			
2024	85,368			
