= Teylers Eerste Schilderijenzaal =

Teylers Museum rooms

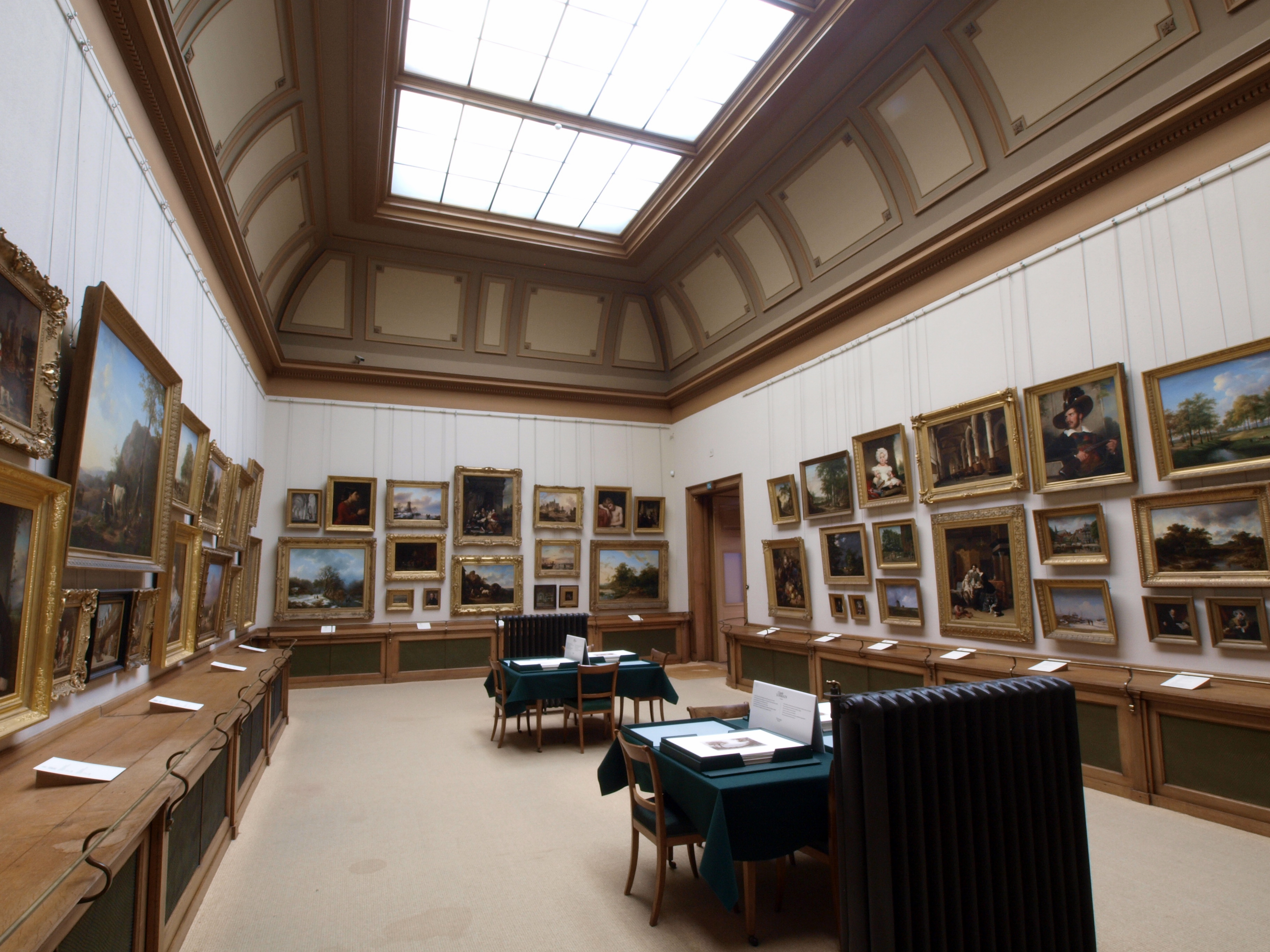
Eerste Schilderijenzaal

The Eerste Schilderijenzaal, or Painting Gallery I, is one of two art gallery rooms in Teylers Museum and is the oldest art gallery for contemporary Dutch art in the Netherlands. It was built onto the back of Teylers Oval Room in 1838. It was the young museum's first exhibition space for paintings and could be entered through the Oval Room, which was itself located behind the Fundatiehuis, the former home of Pieter Teyler van der Hulst.

== History ==
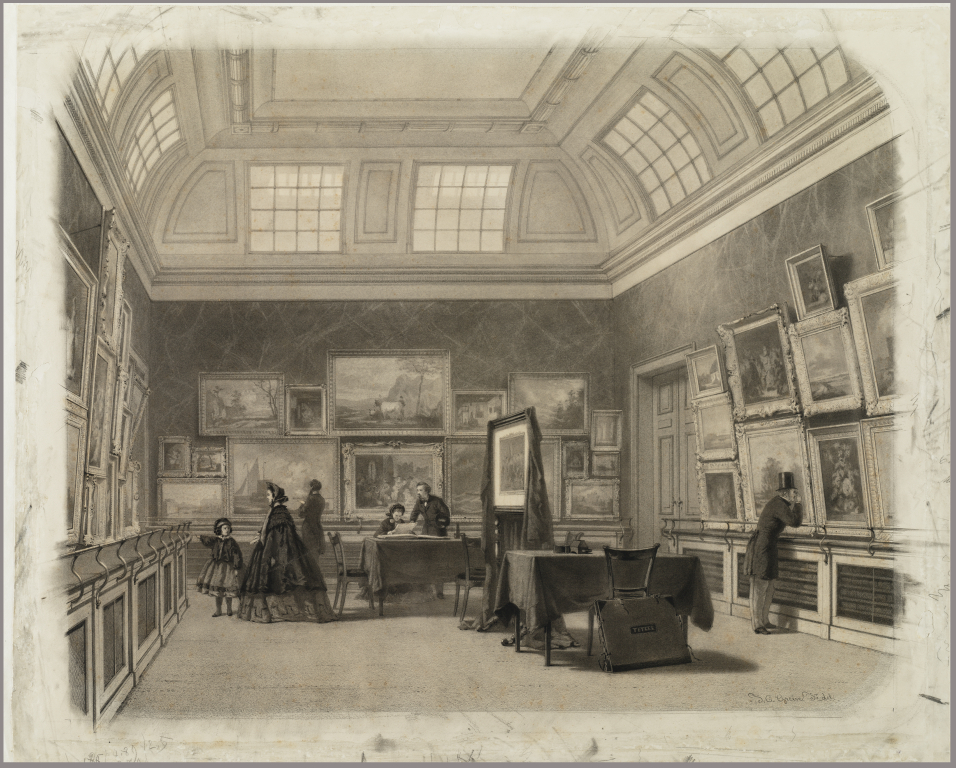
Johan Conrad Greive, Interior of Paintings Gallery I, drawing, 1862.

Teylers Foundation started collecting contemporary Dutch paintings in 1821. The paintings were either commissioned directly from the painters or acquired at exhibitions. The first room used to display paintings was the room that is today used as a print cabinet and was added to the Oval room in 1824 along with the library room upstairs. The lack of light quickly made viewing the paintings there unpopular and it was used mostly for lectures and experiments. According to the archives, the expansion was done by the foundation's own building crew that was on hand for day-to-day improvements. The gallery had large curved windows like the Oval room, which have since been closed. An impression of the original windows can be seen in a charcoal sketch by Johan Conrad Greive in 1862. The collection today is mostly based on that same group of paintings. The gallery also contains a table that was used to hold the portfolios of drawings and a similar portfolio with Rembrandt and Michelangelo reproductions can still be consulted (the actual drawings are held in special storage).

== Paintings ==
The selection of paintings was done mostly according to the advice of the curator and concierge, who lived in the Fundatiehuis. For the early days this was Vincent Jansz van der Vinne. Van der Vinne was replaced by Wybrand Hendriks, whose own works, those of his friends, and works by his successor Gerrit Jan Michaëlis hang in the gallery. No works by Van der Vinne are represented, who left Teylers after a disagreement with Martin van Marum. One of the first large canvases to be purchased (1825) was Storm at sea, by the marine painter Johannes Christiaan Schotel. A few years later, its counterpart was ordered: Calm sea. It is striking that, in the early period, paintings were often bought in pairs.

List of painters in alphabetical order, accompanied by an example hanging in the first gallery:

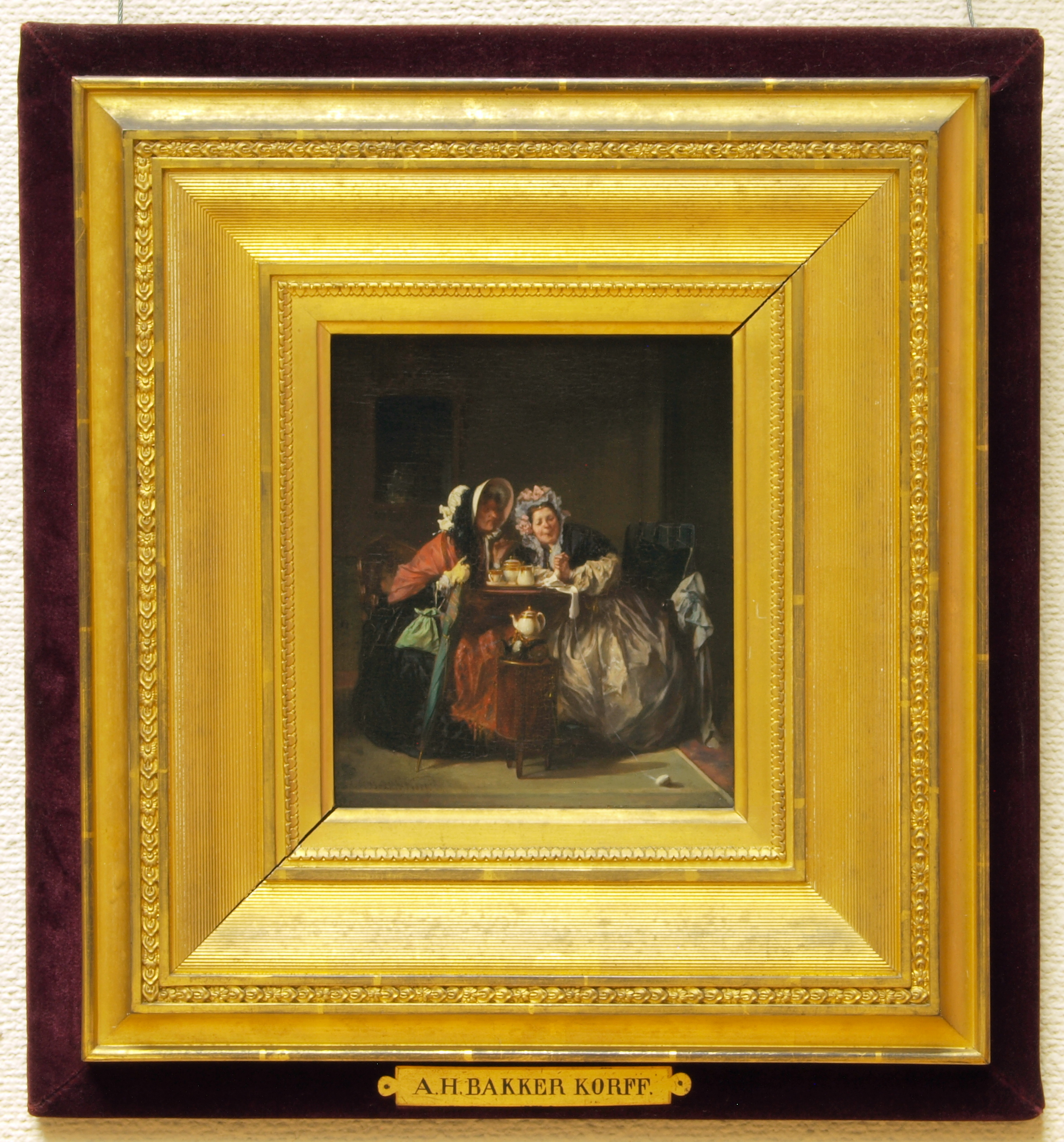
Alexander Hugo Bakker Korff

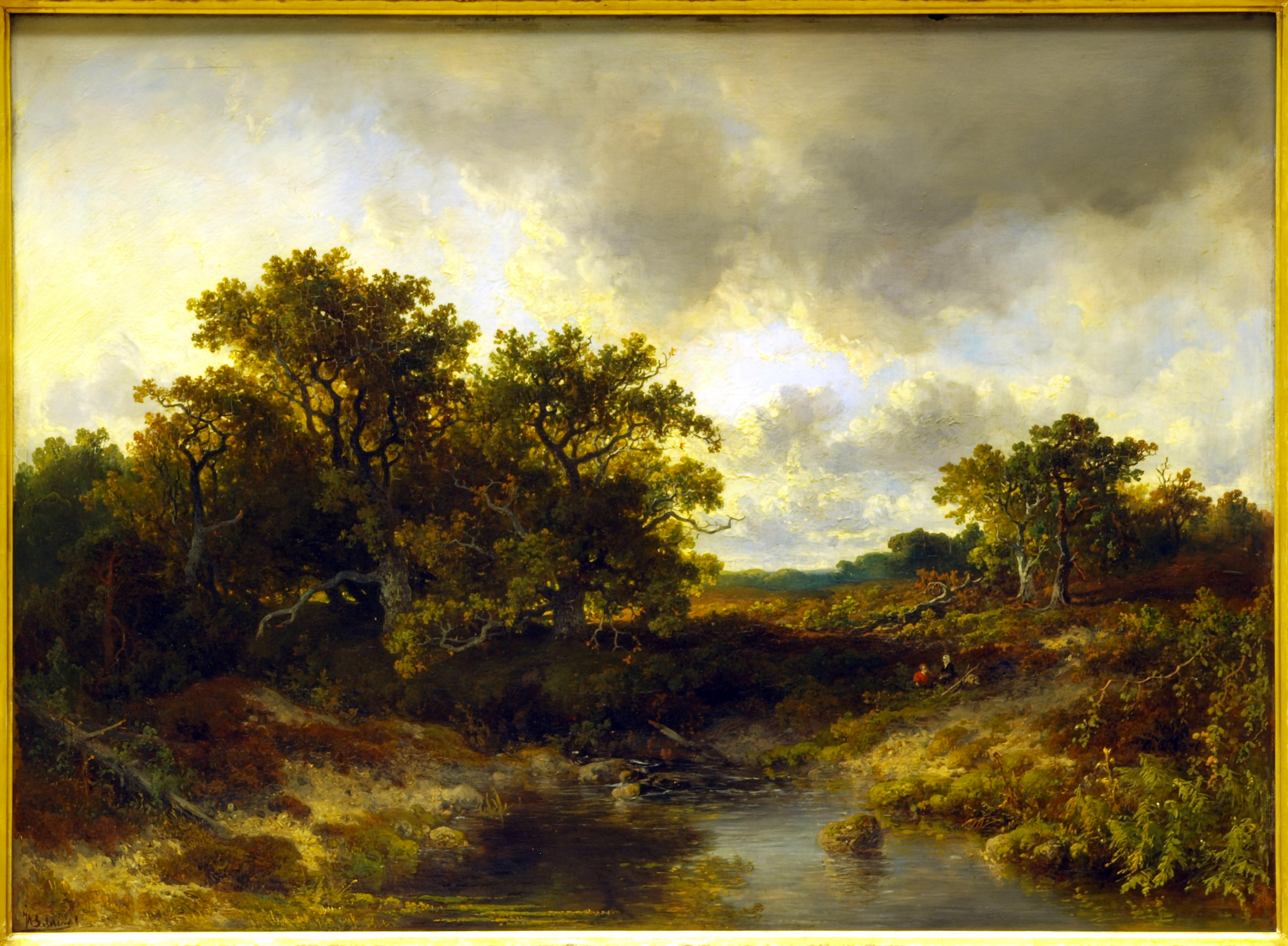
Johannes Warnardus Bilders

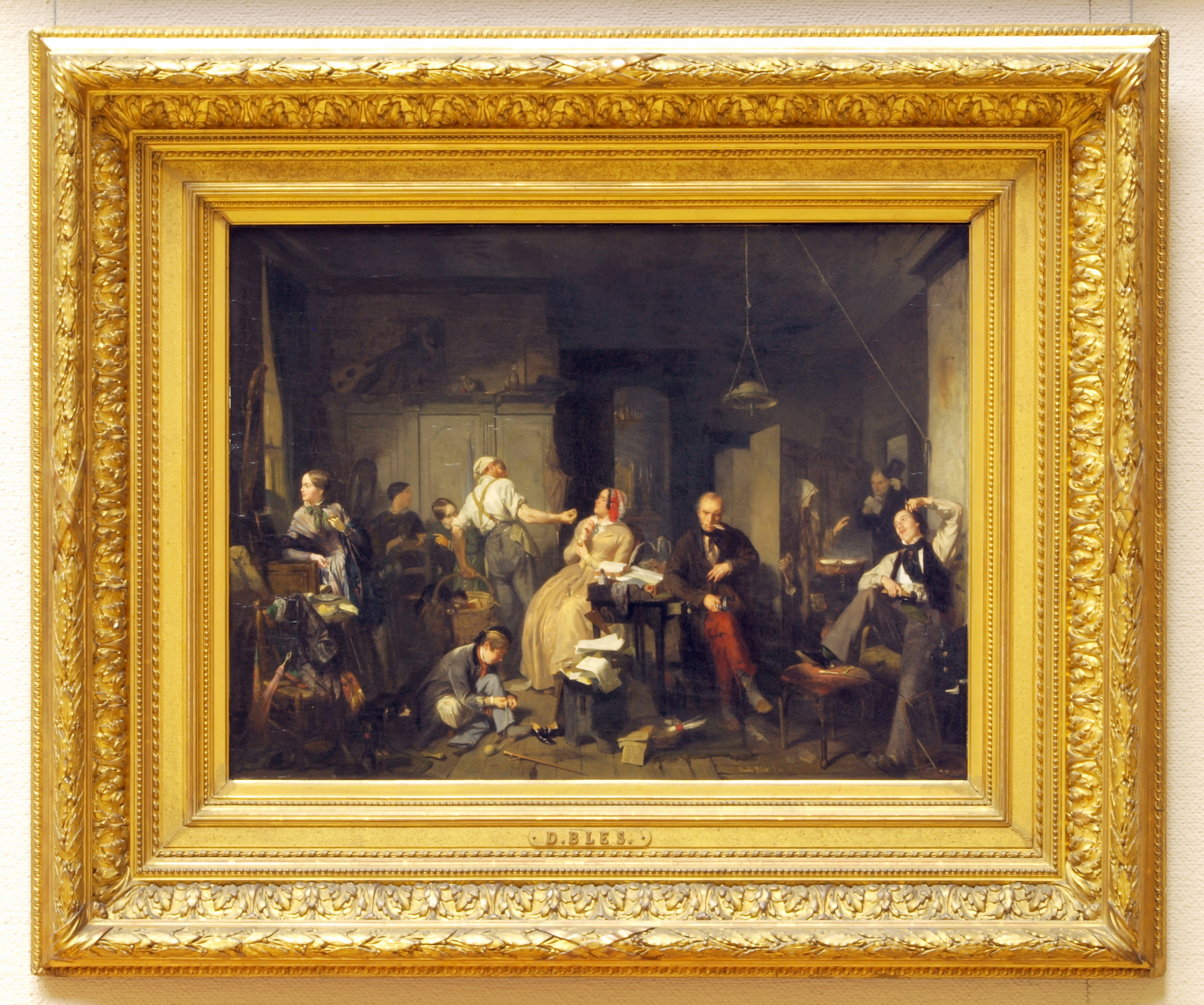
David Bles

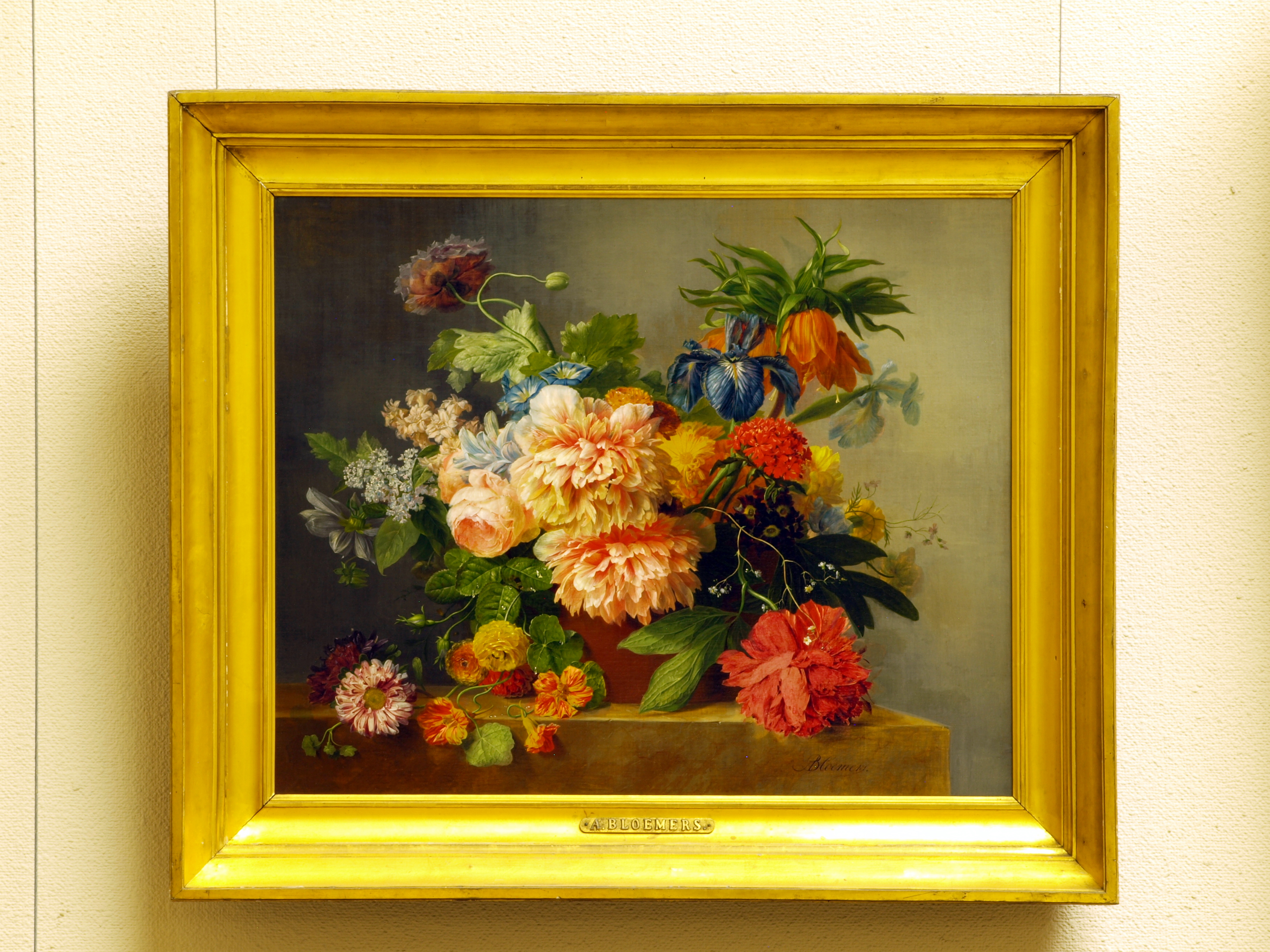
Arnoldus Bloemers

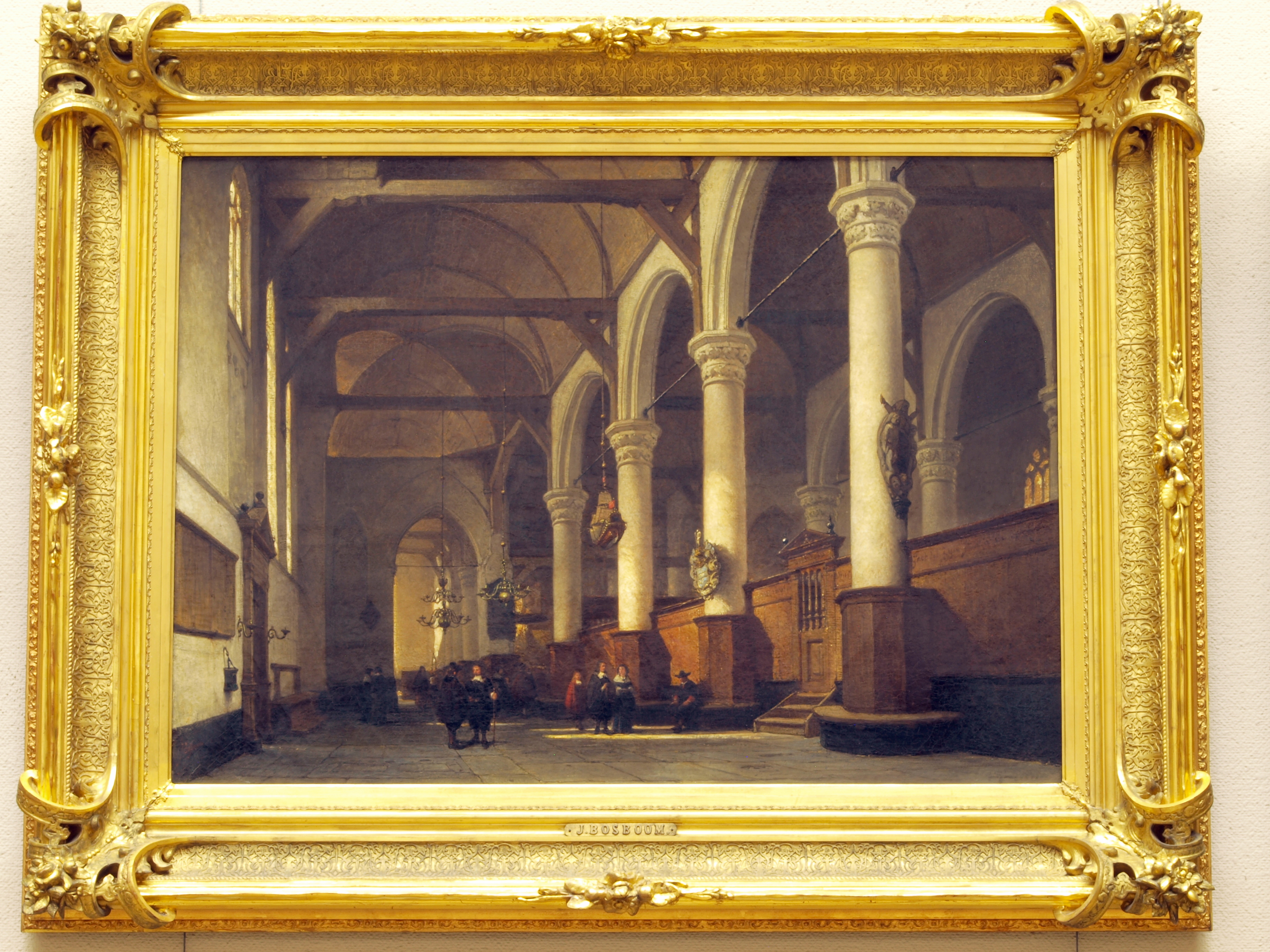
Johannes Bosboom

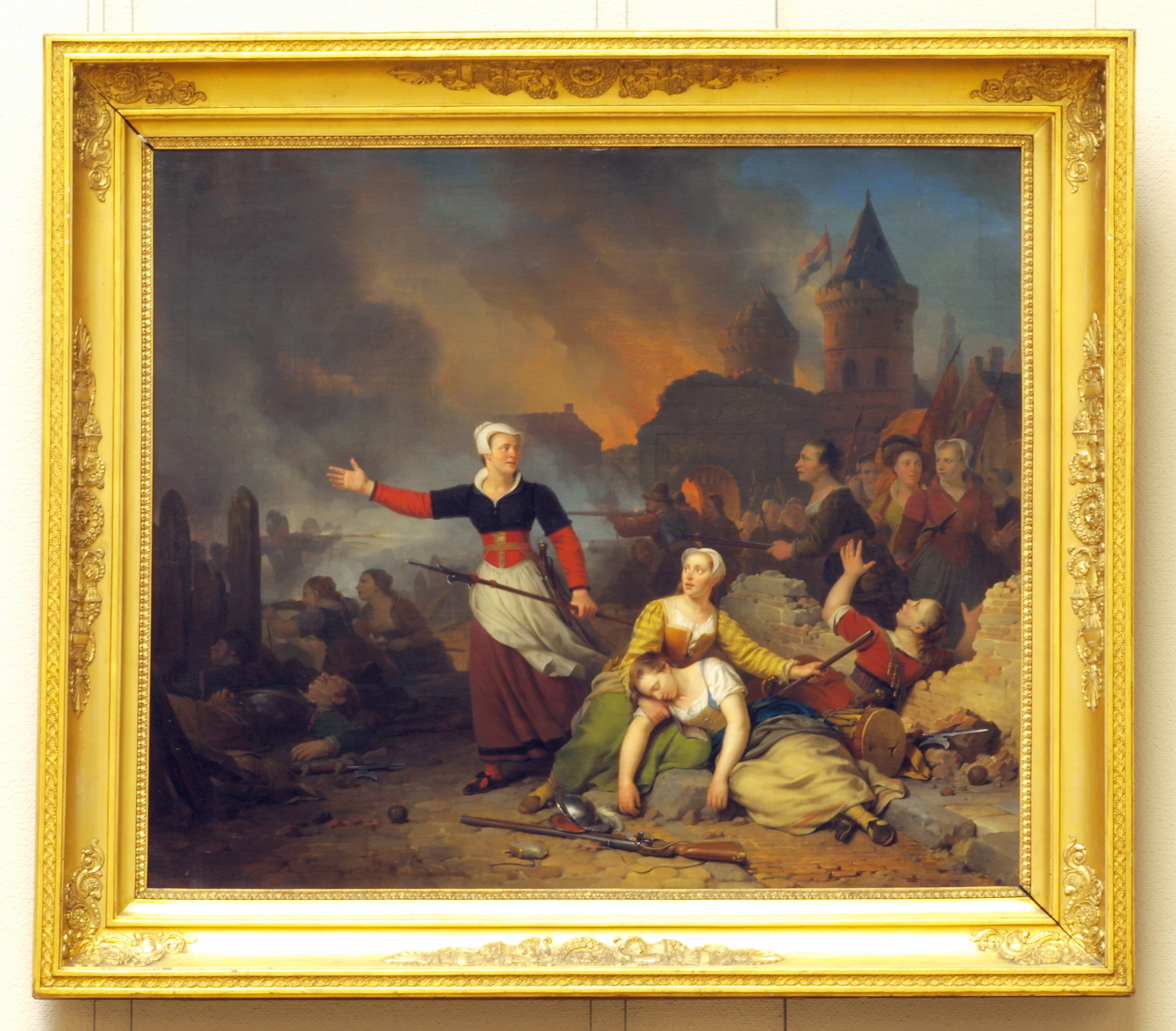
Ferdinand de Braekeleer the Elder

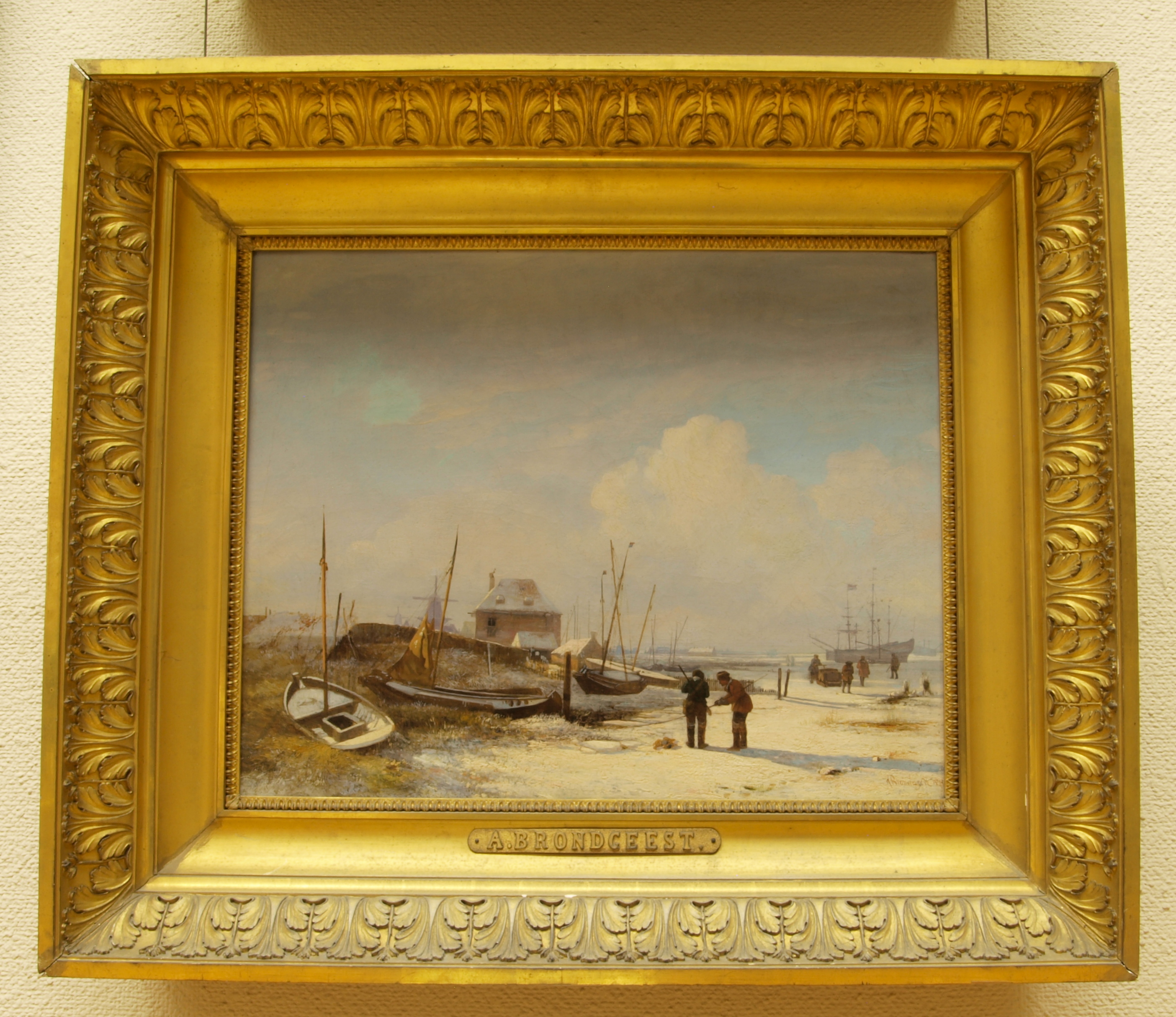
Albertus Brondgeest

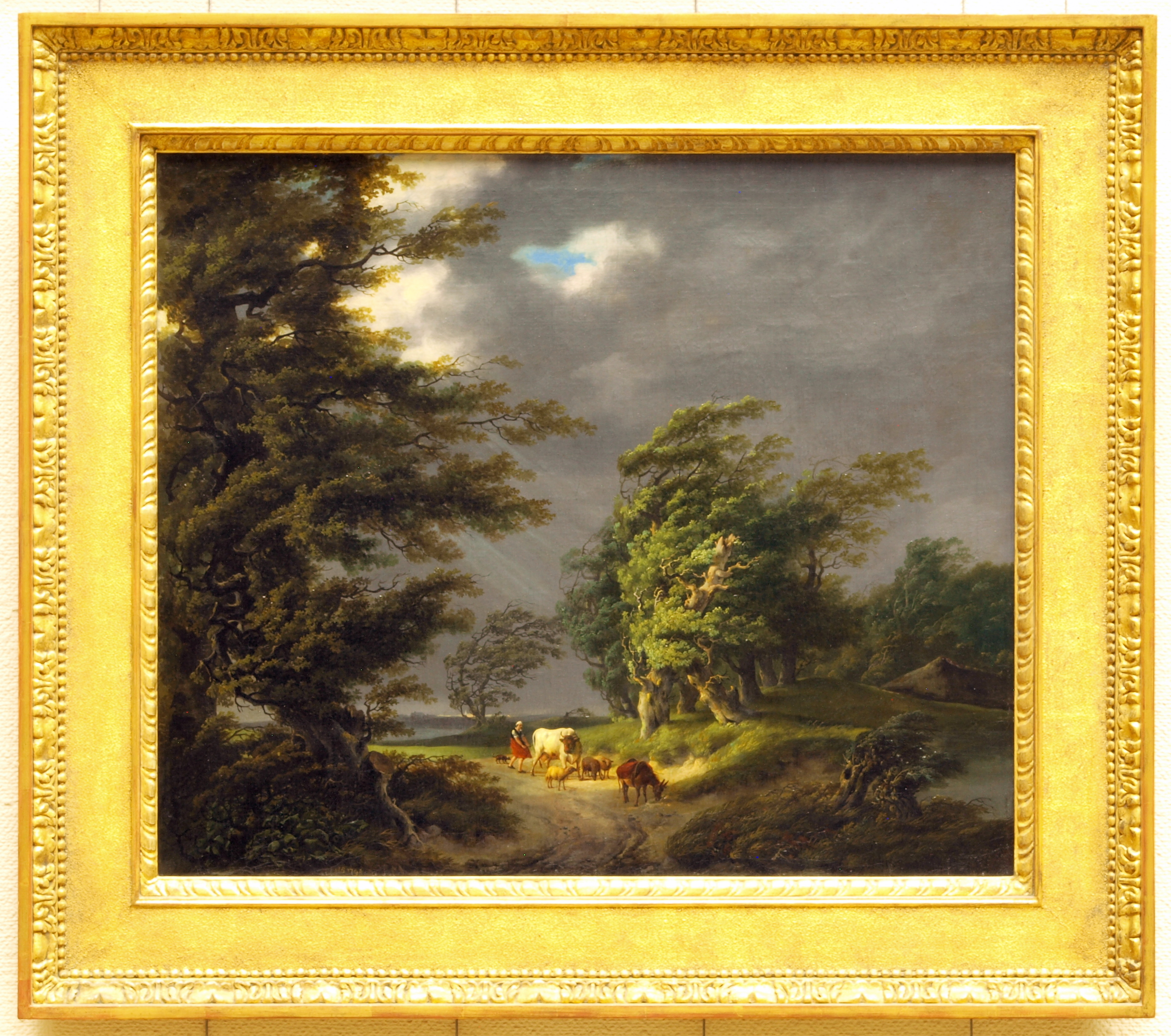
Hermanus van Brussel

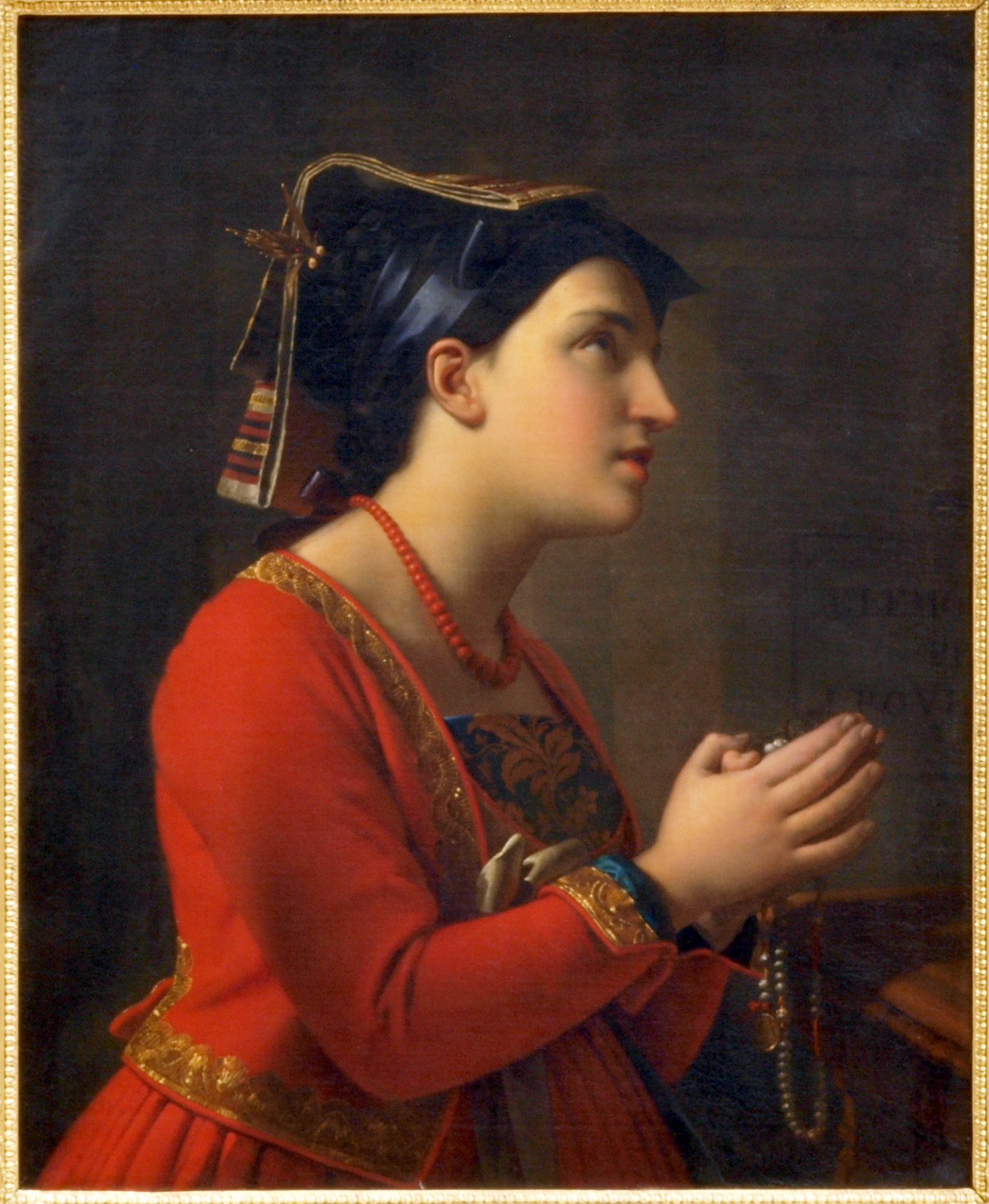
Moritz Calisch

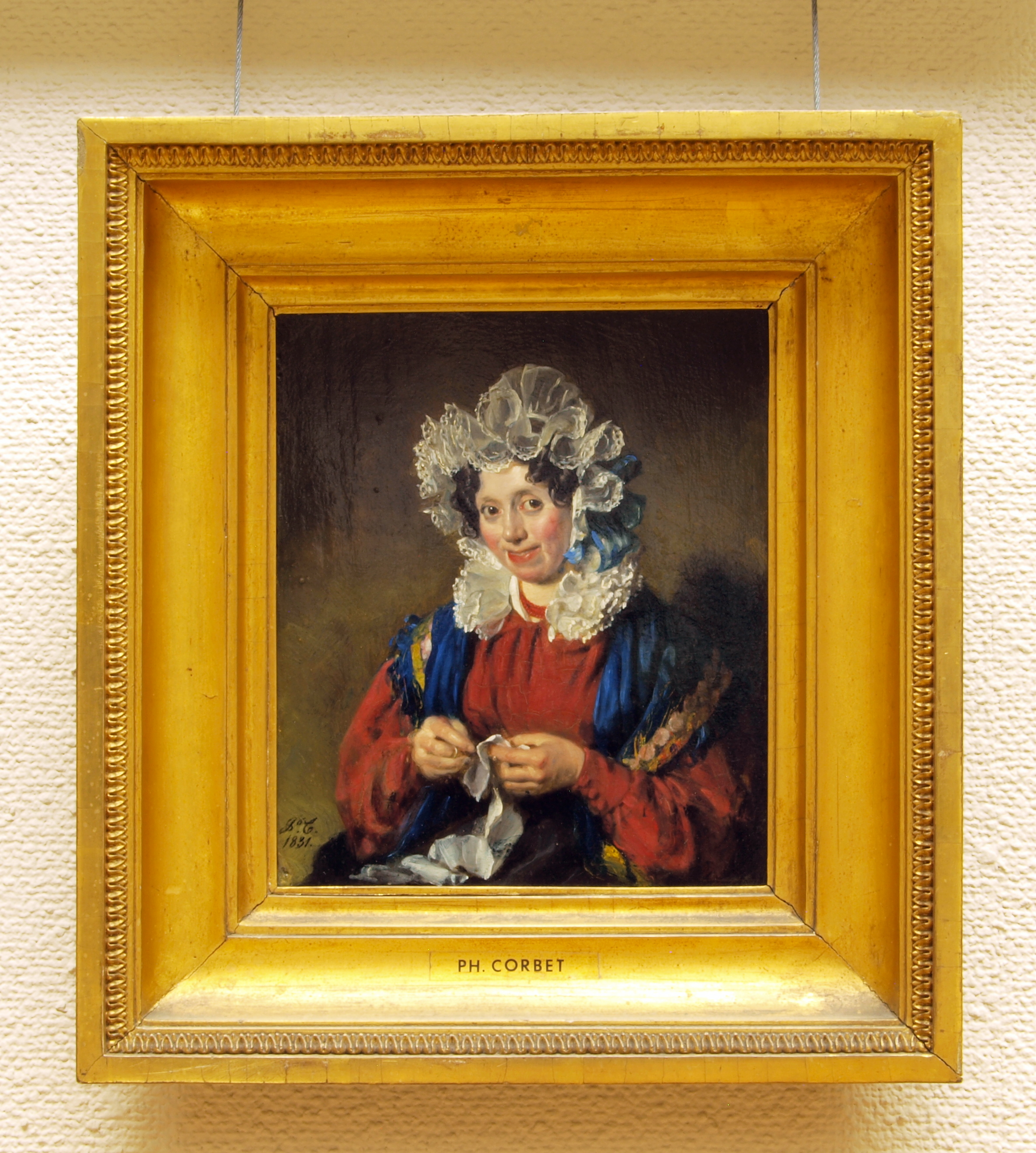
Philip Corbet

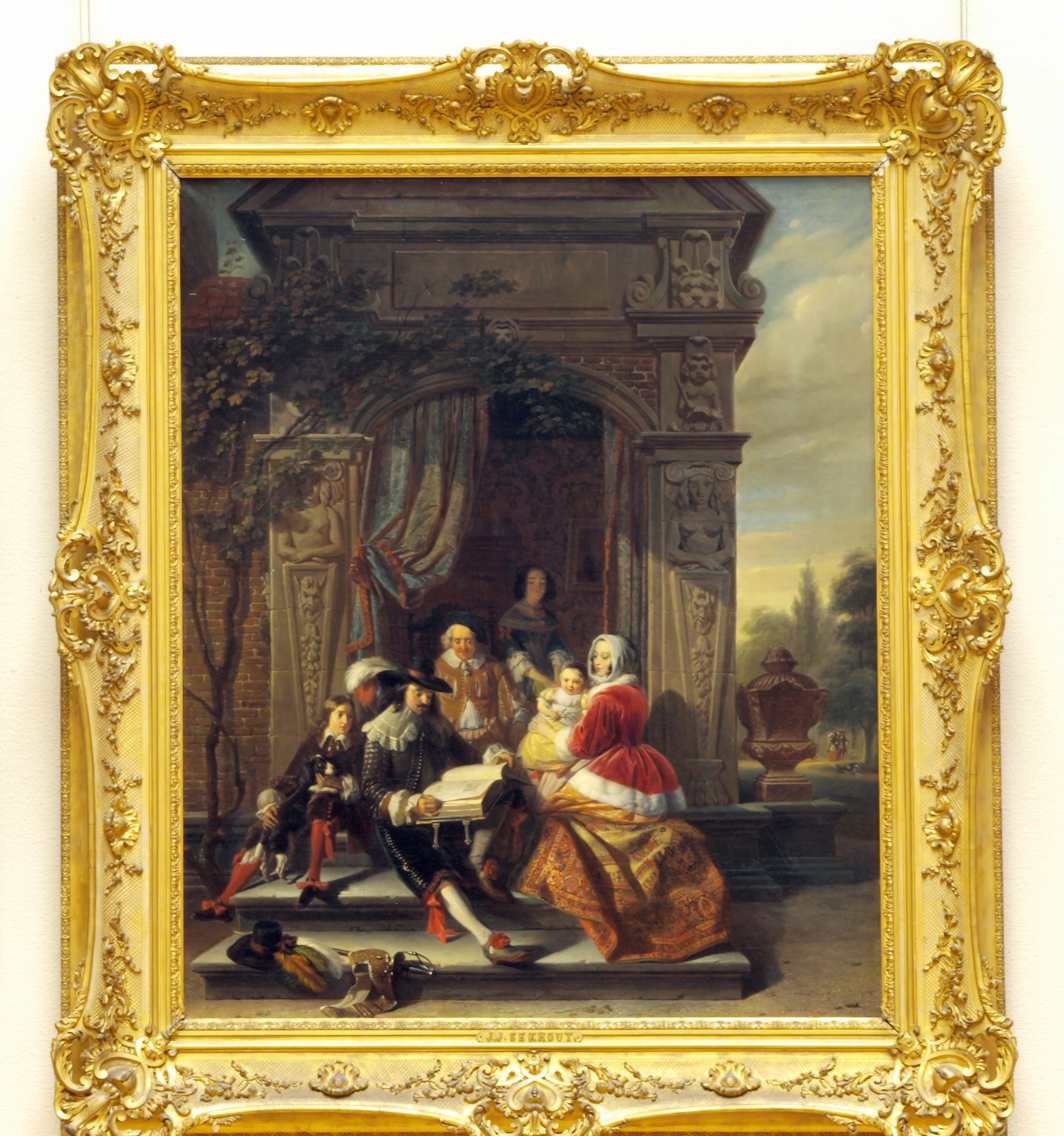
Jacobus Josephus Eeckhout

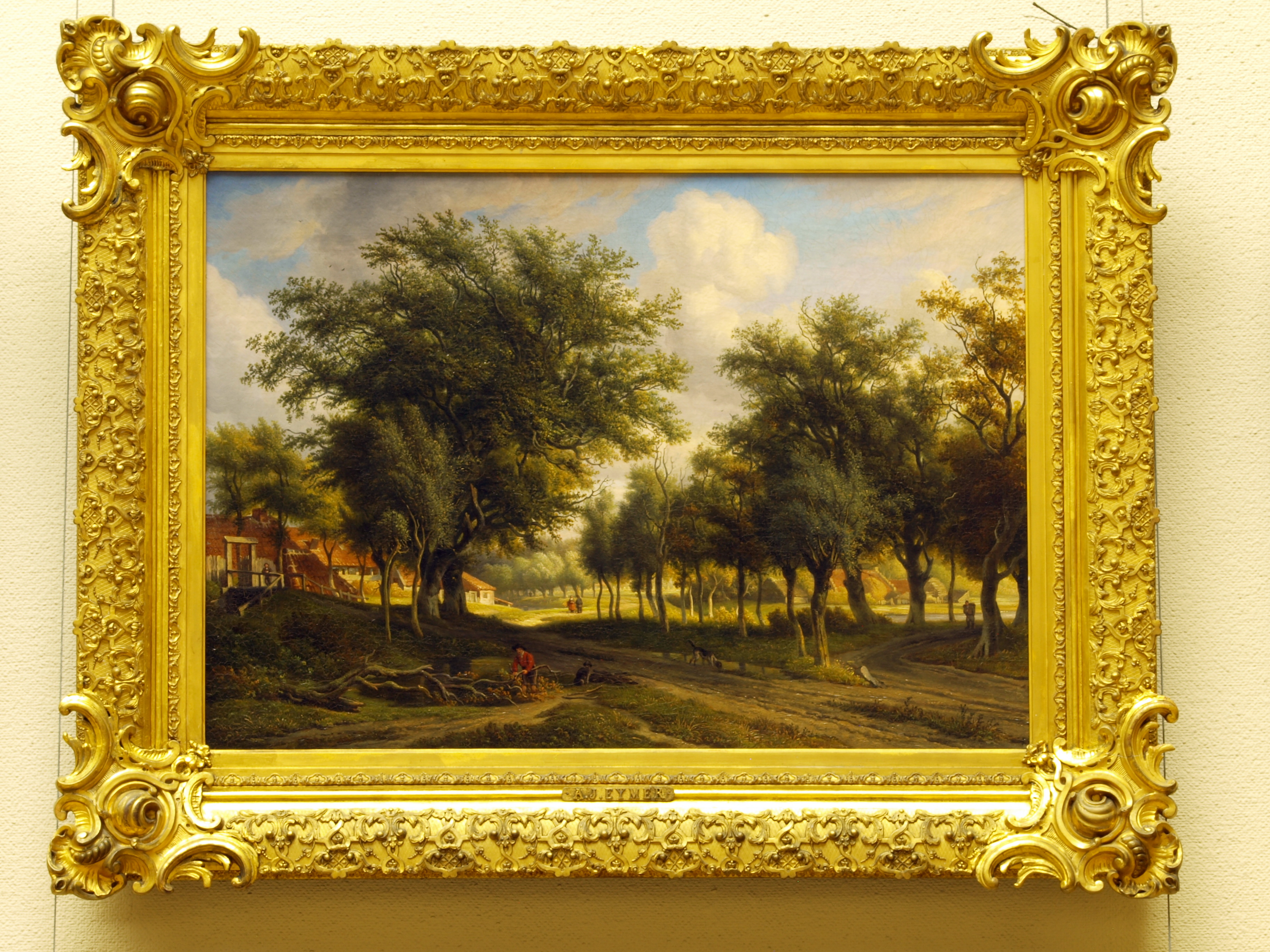
Arnoldus Johannes Eymer

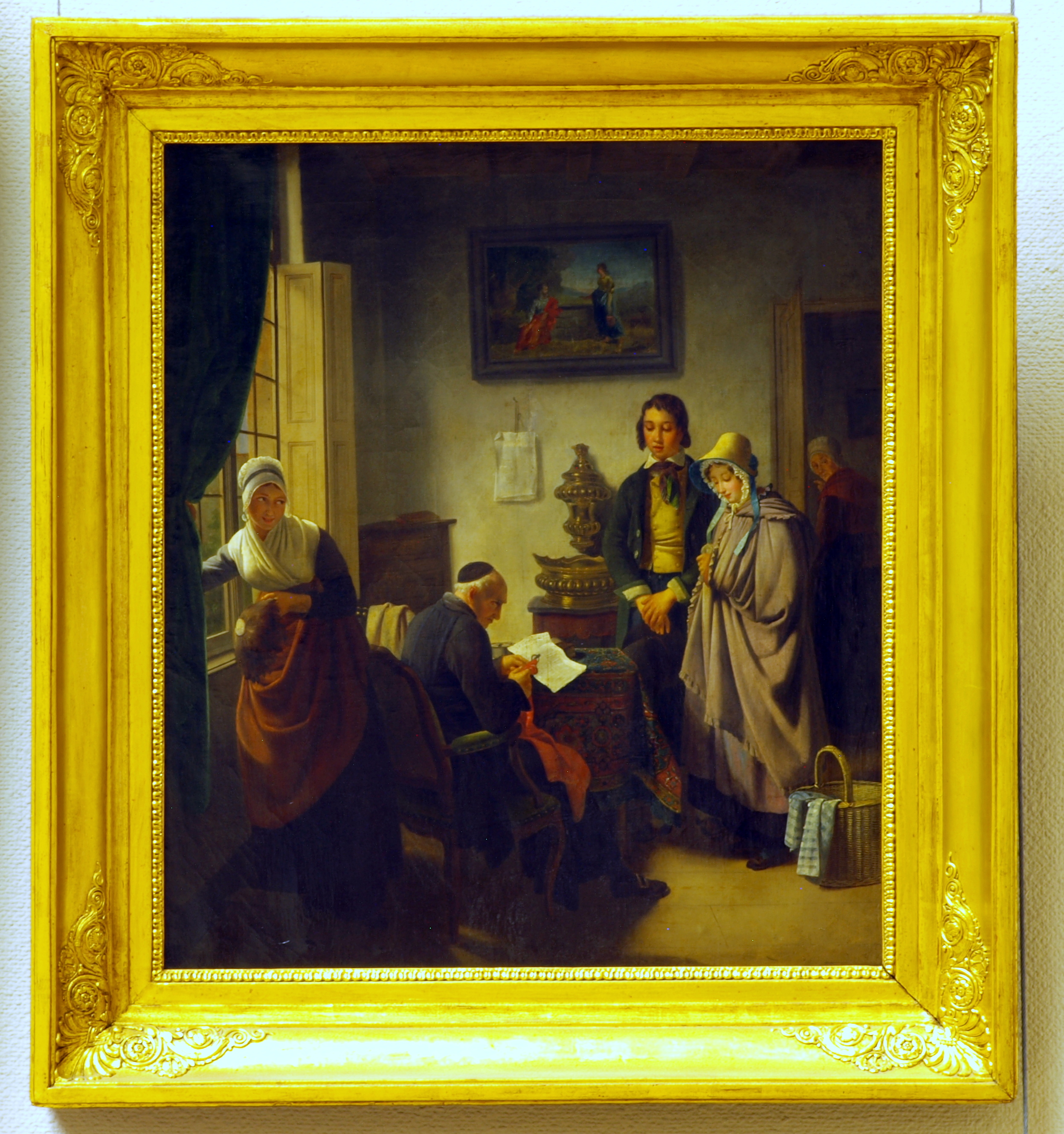
Jozef Geirnaert

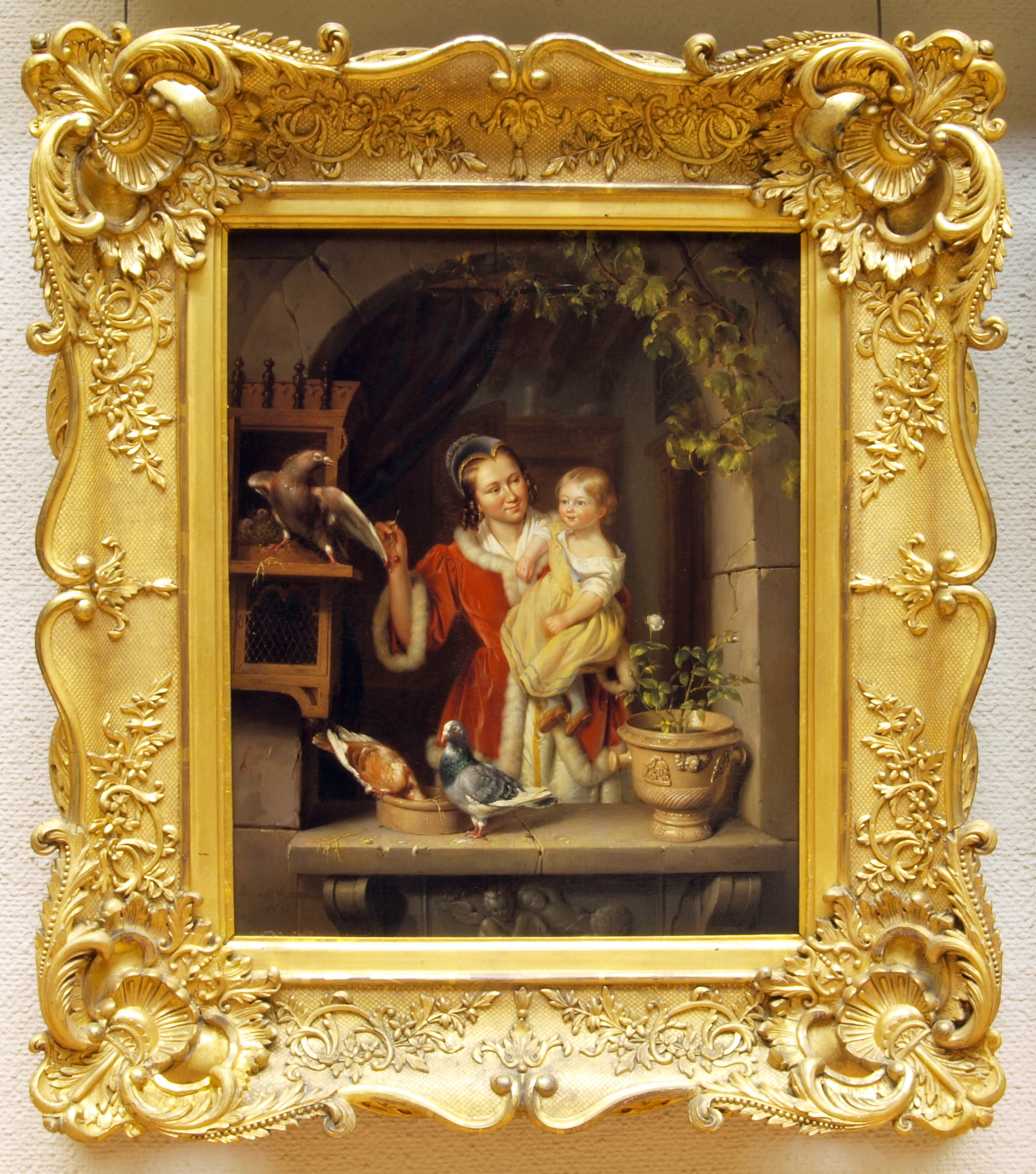
Elisabeth Alida Haanen

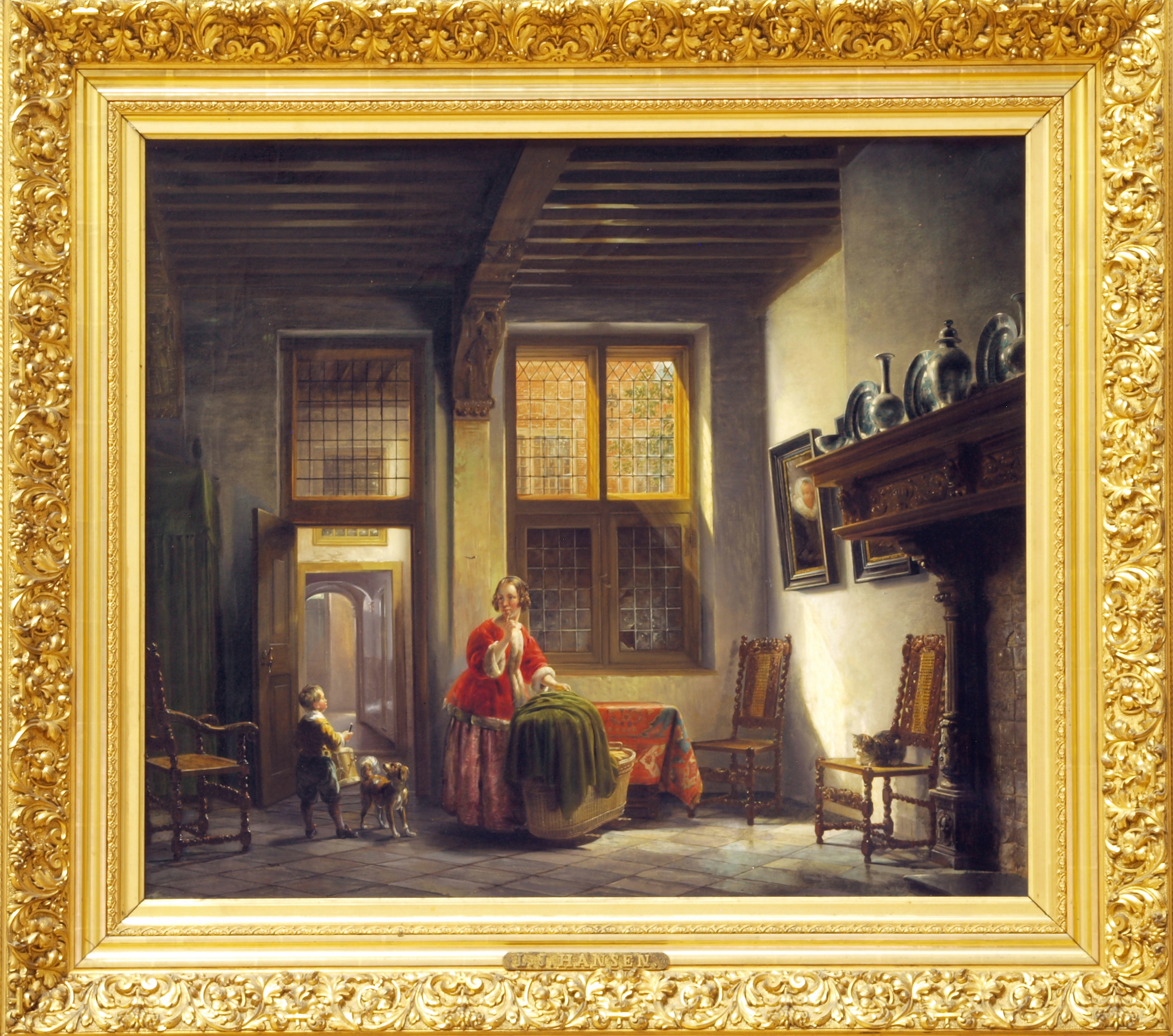
Lambertus Johannes Hansen

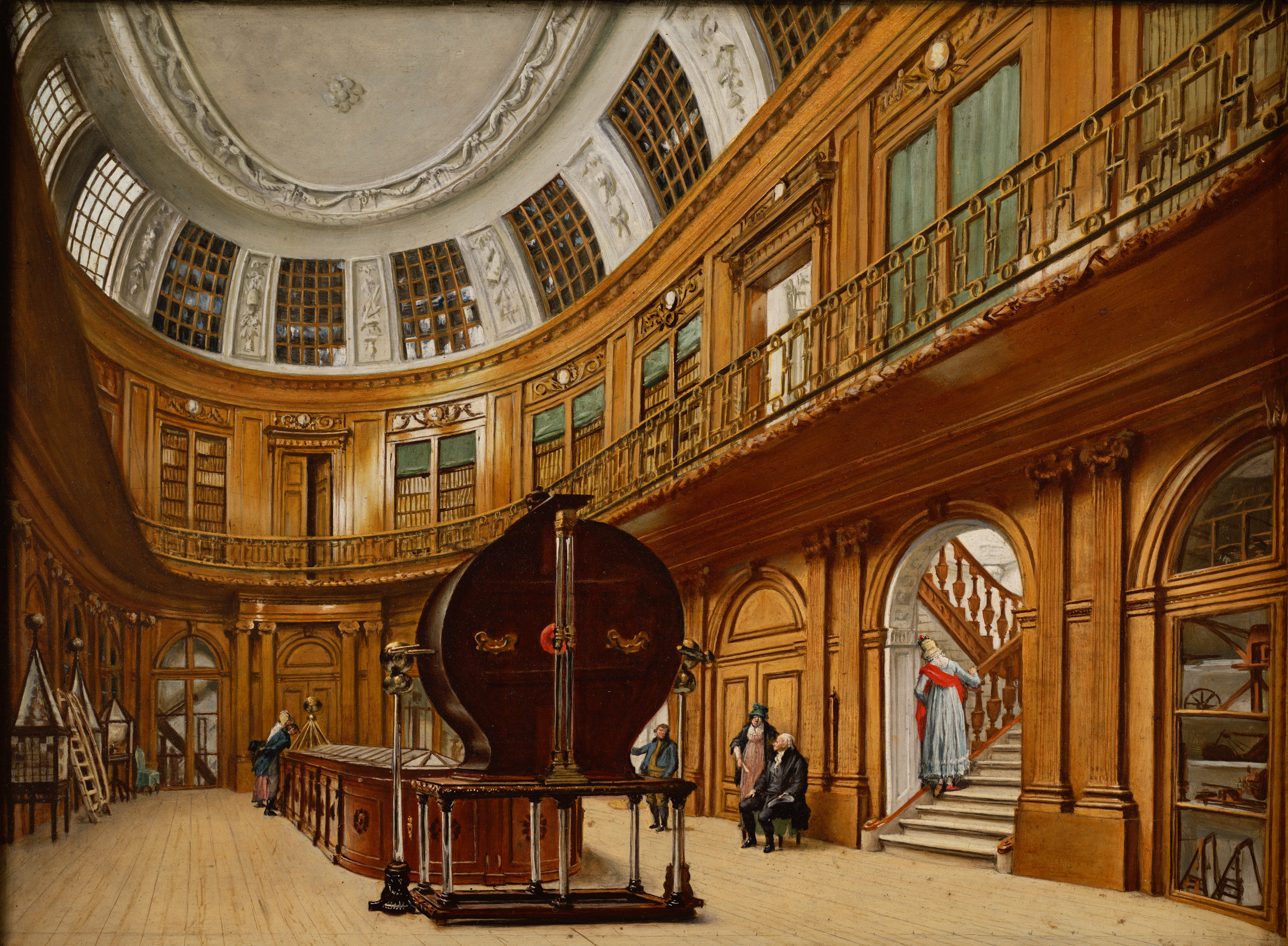
Wybrand Hendricks

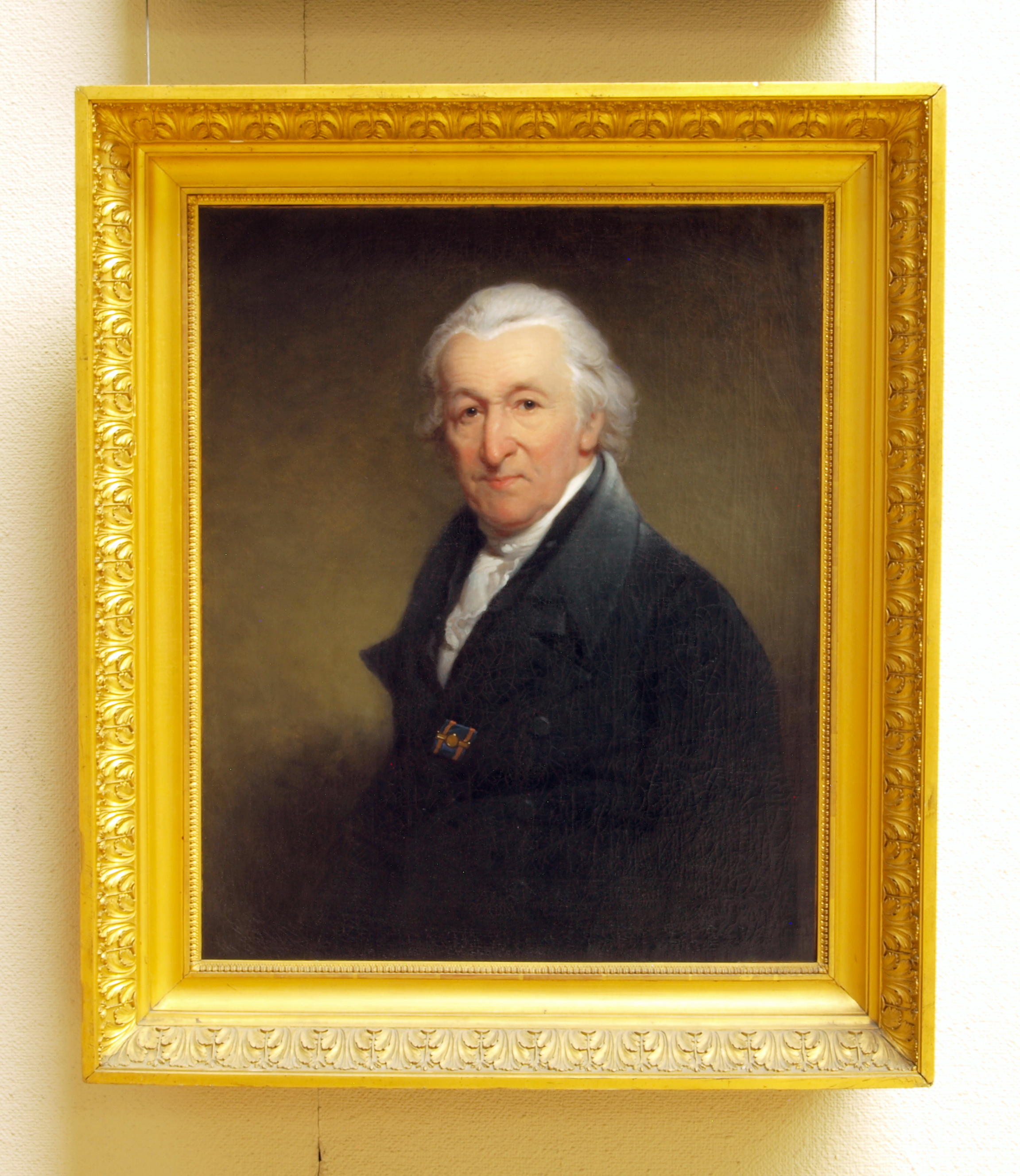
Charles Howard Hodges

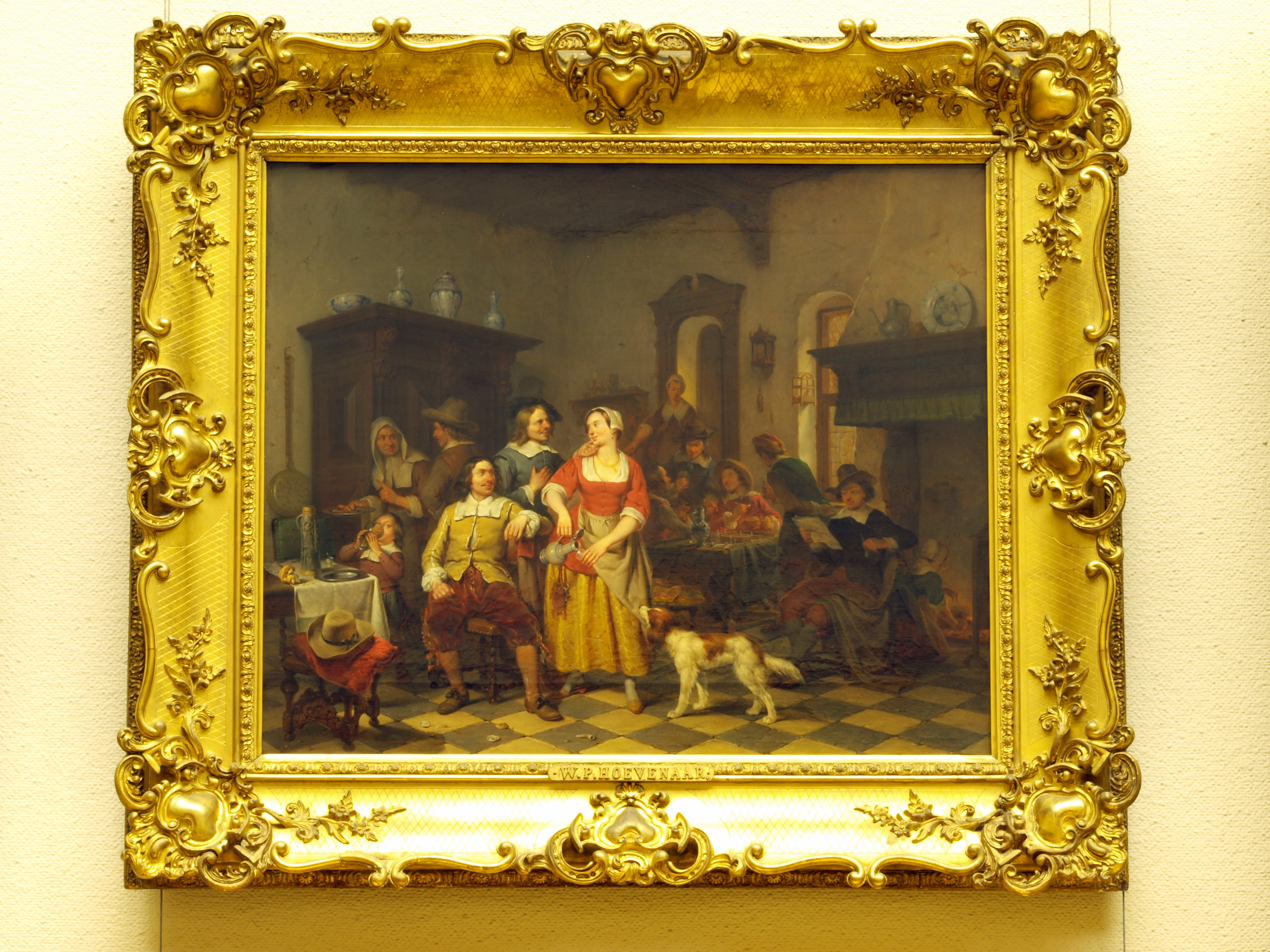
Willem Pieter Hoevenaar

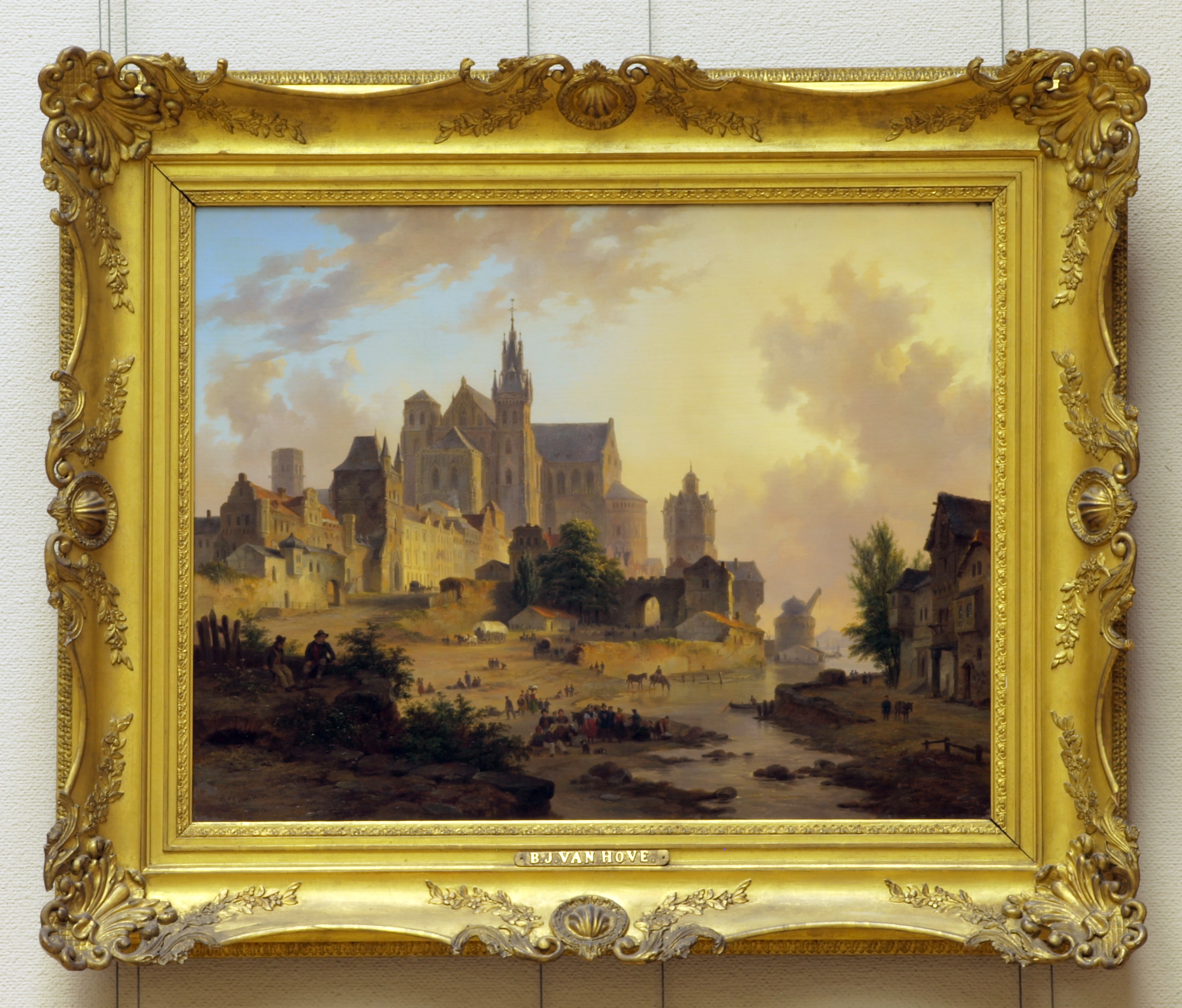
Bartholomeus van Hove (painter)

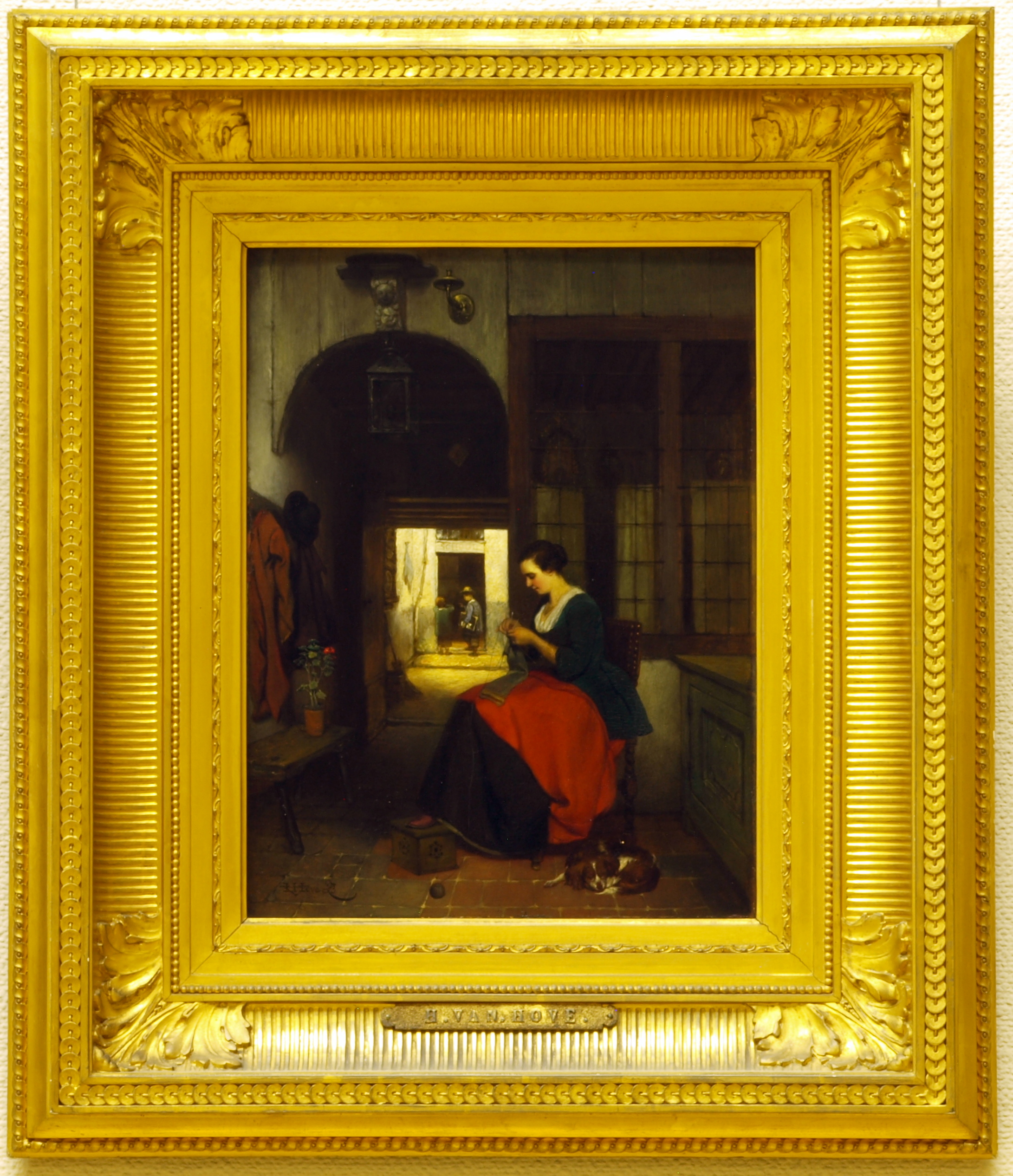
Hubertus van Hove

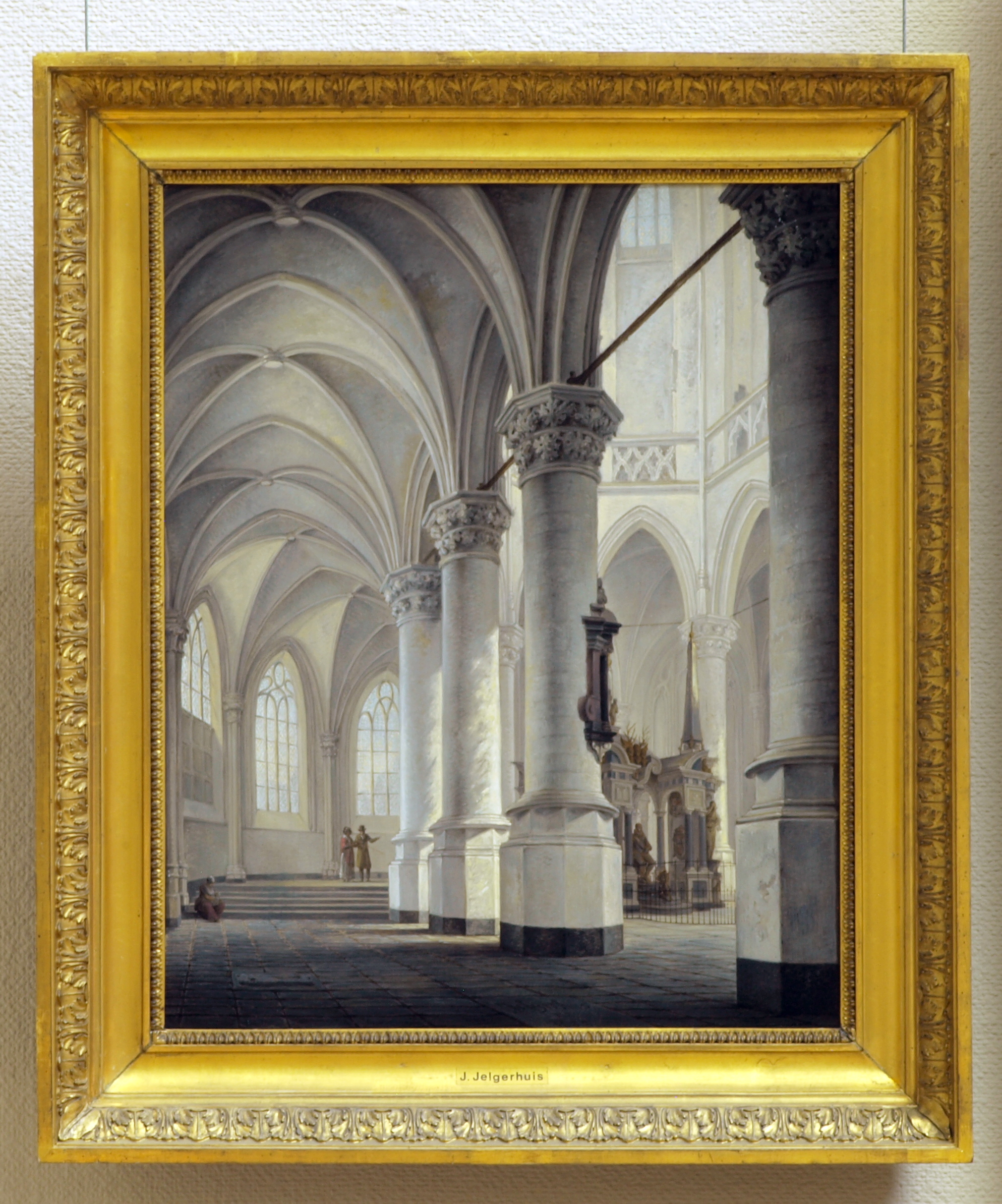
Johannes Jelgerhuis

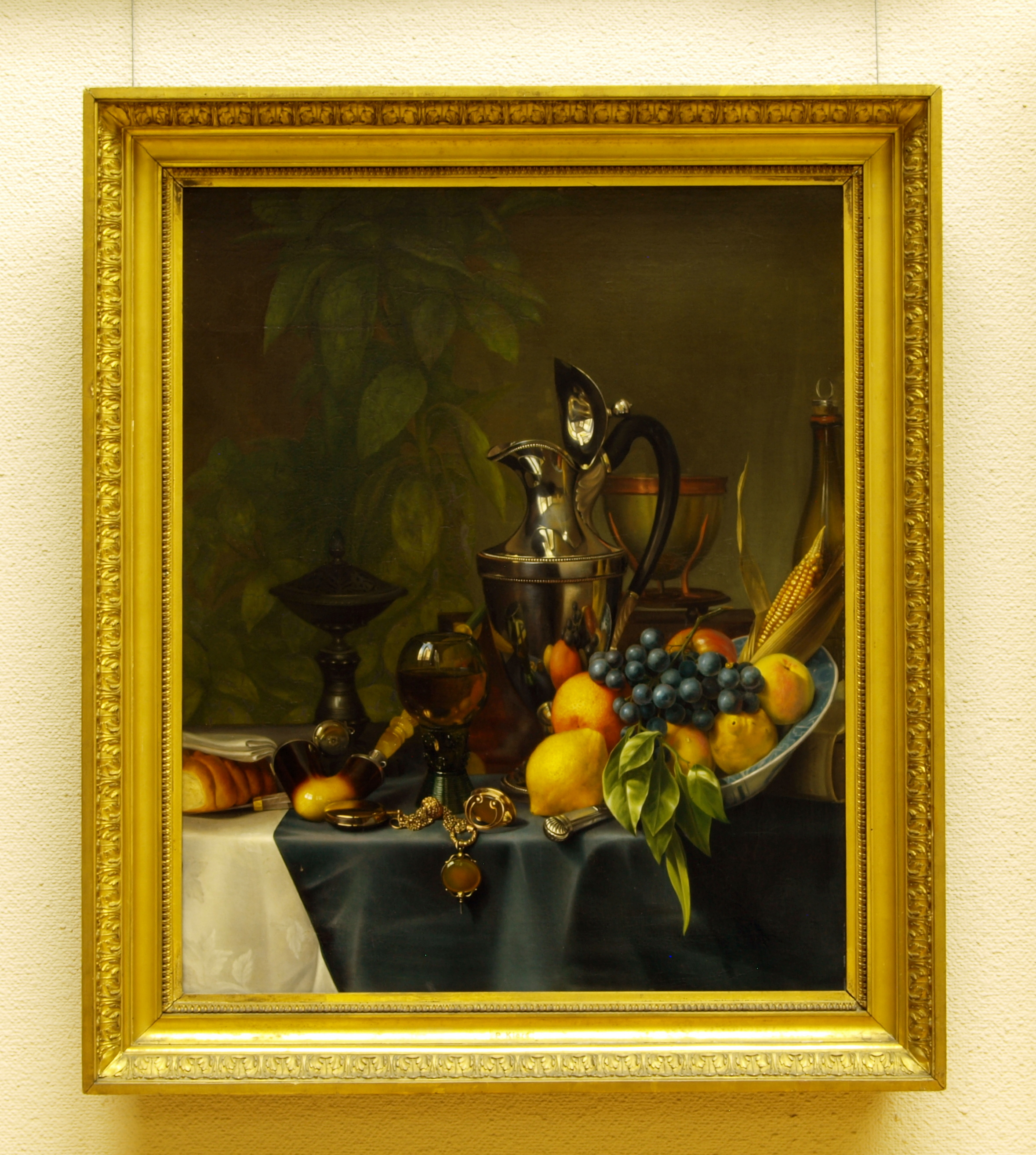
Petrus Kiers

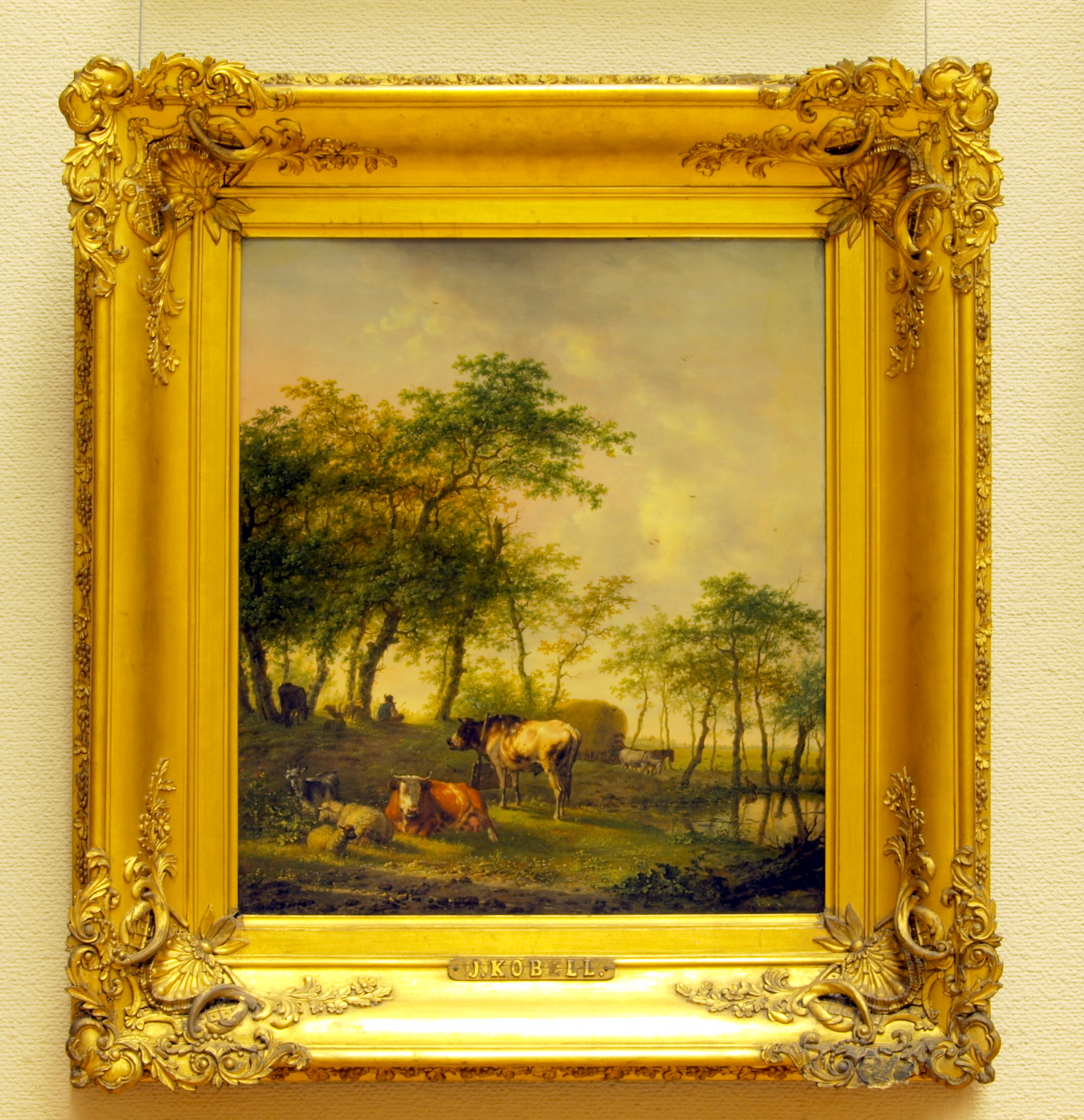
Jan Kobell

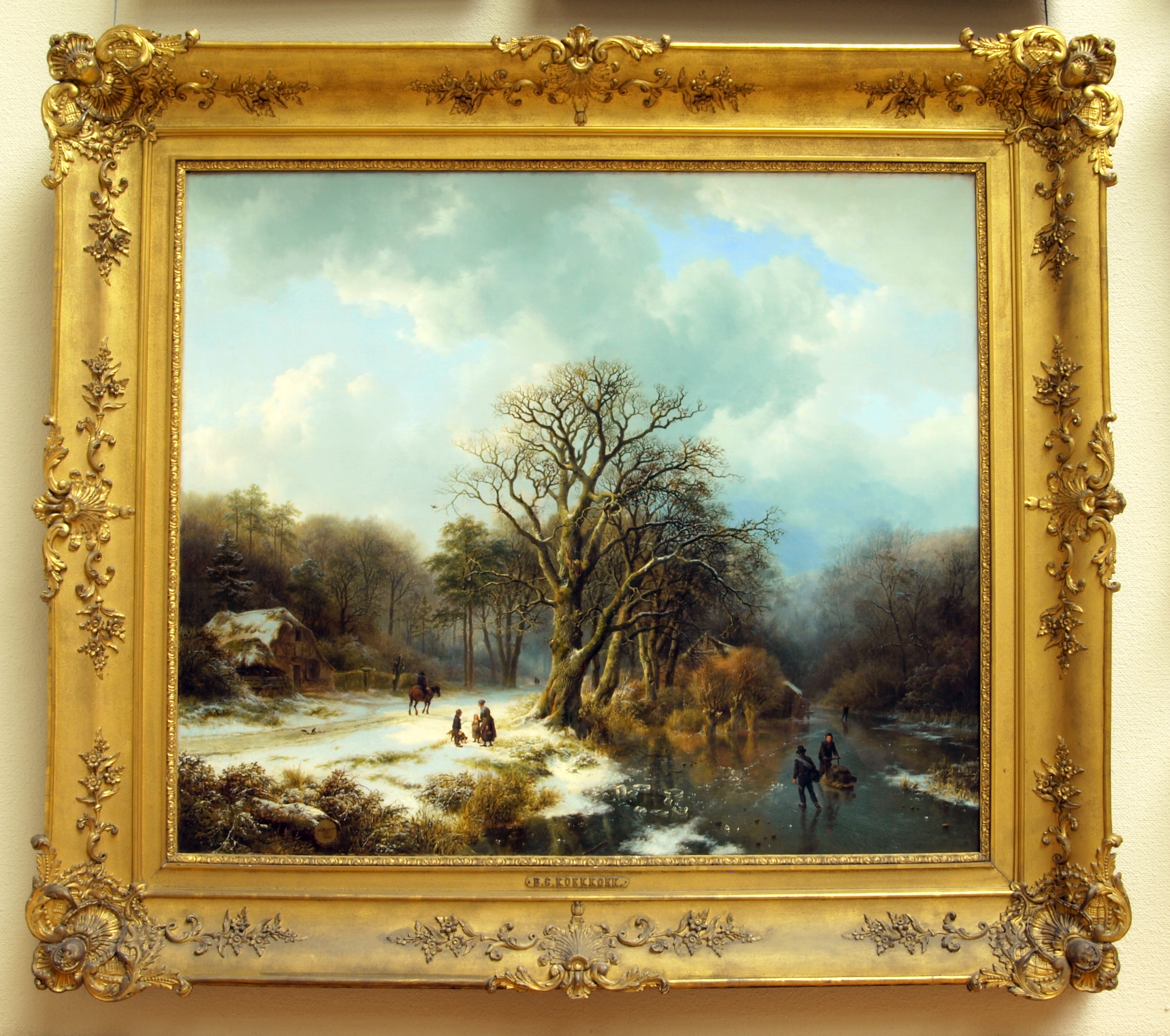
Barend Cornelis Koekkoek

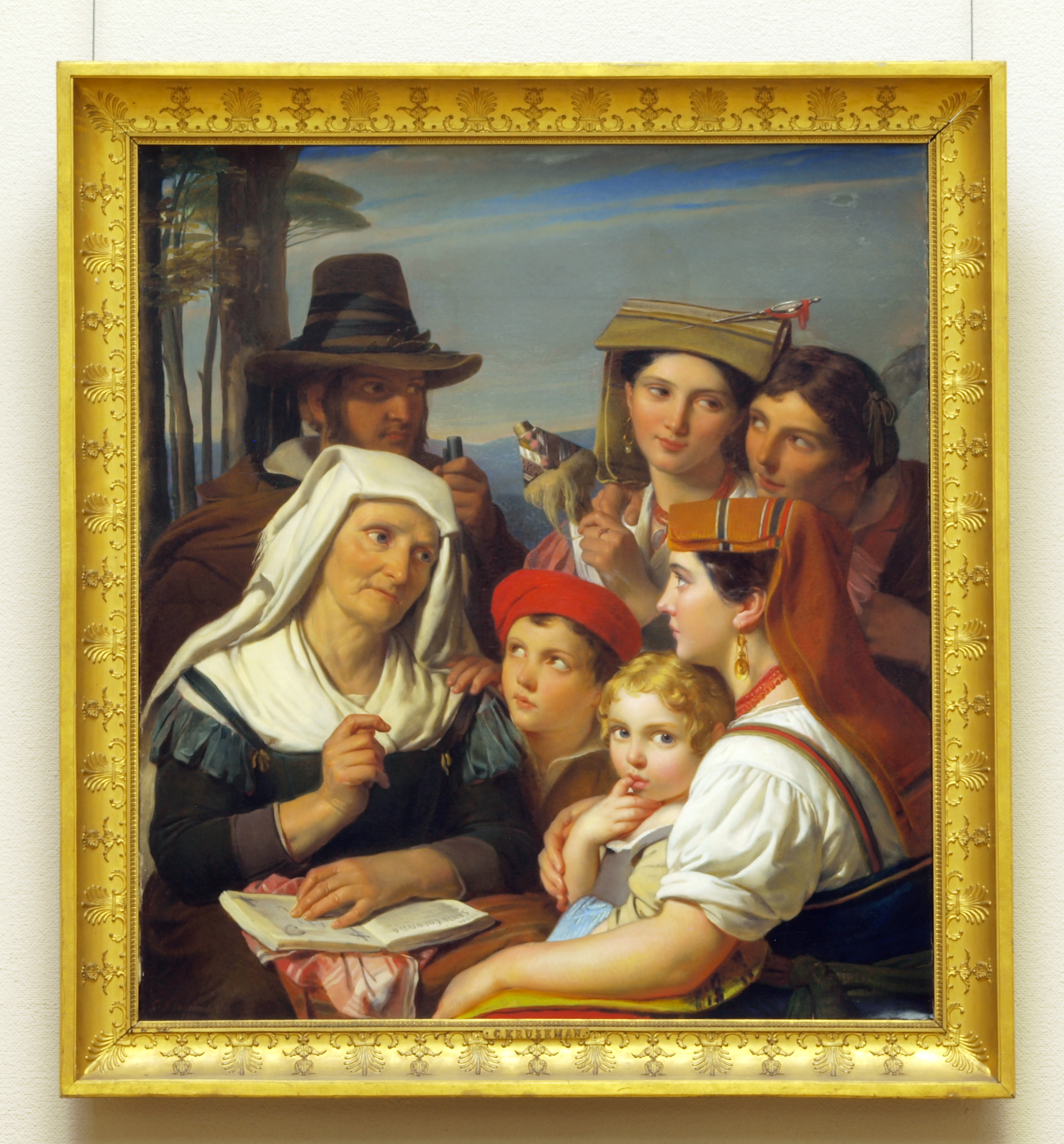
Cornelis Kruseman

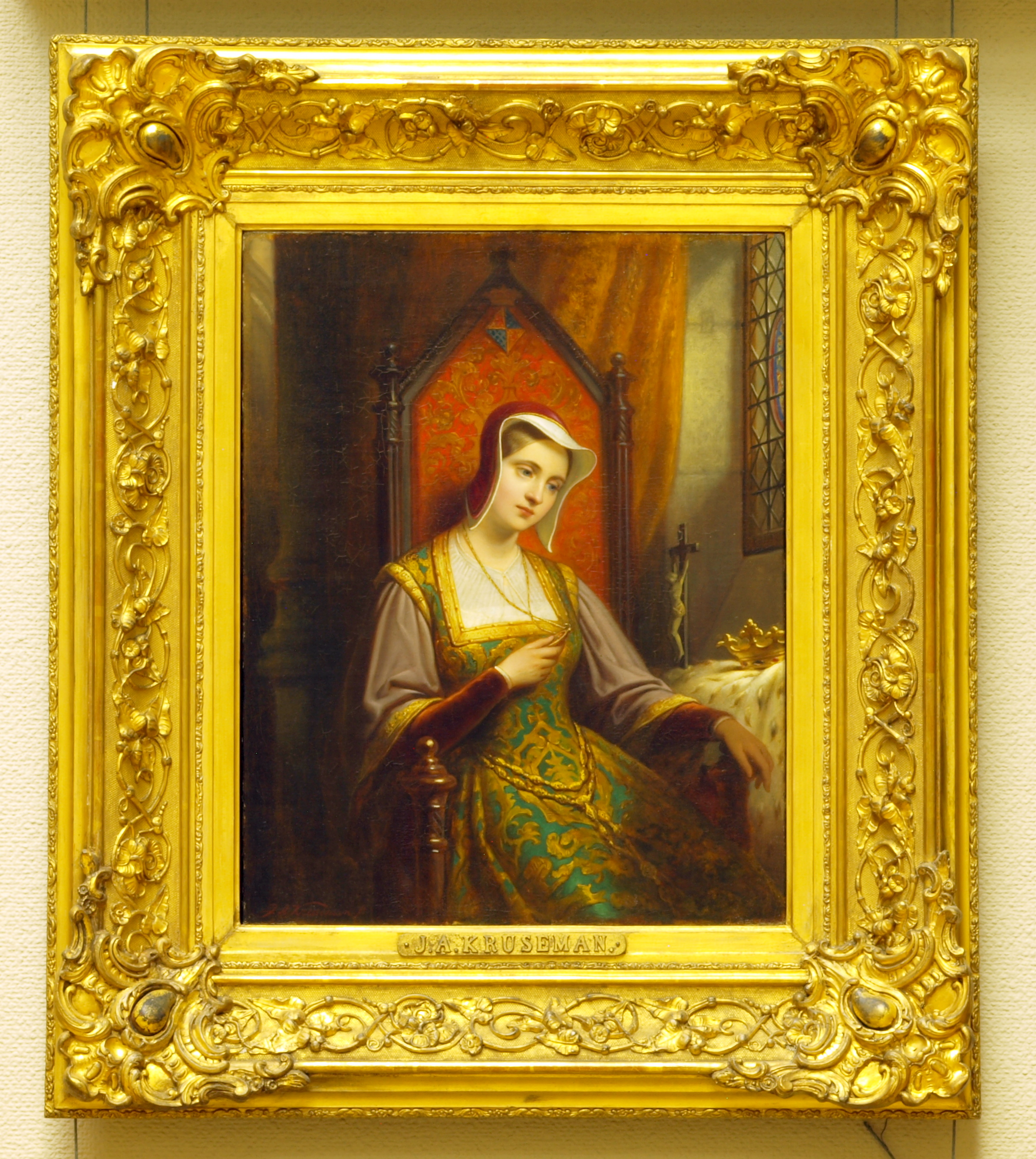
Jan Adam Kruseman

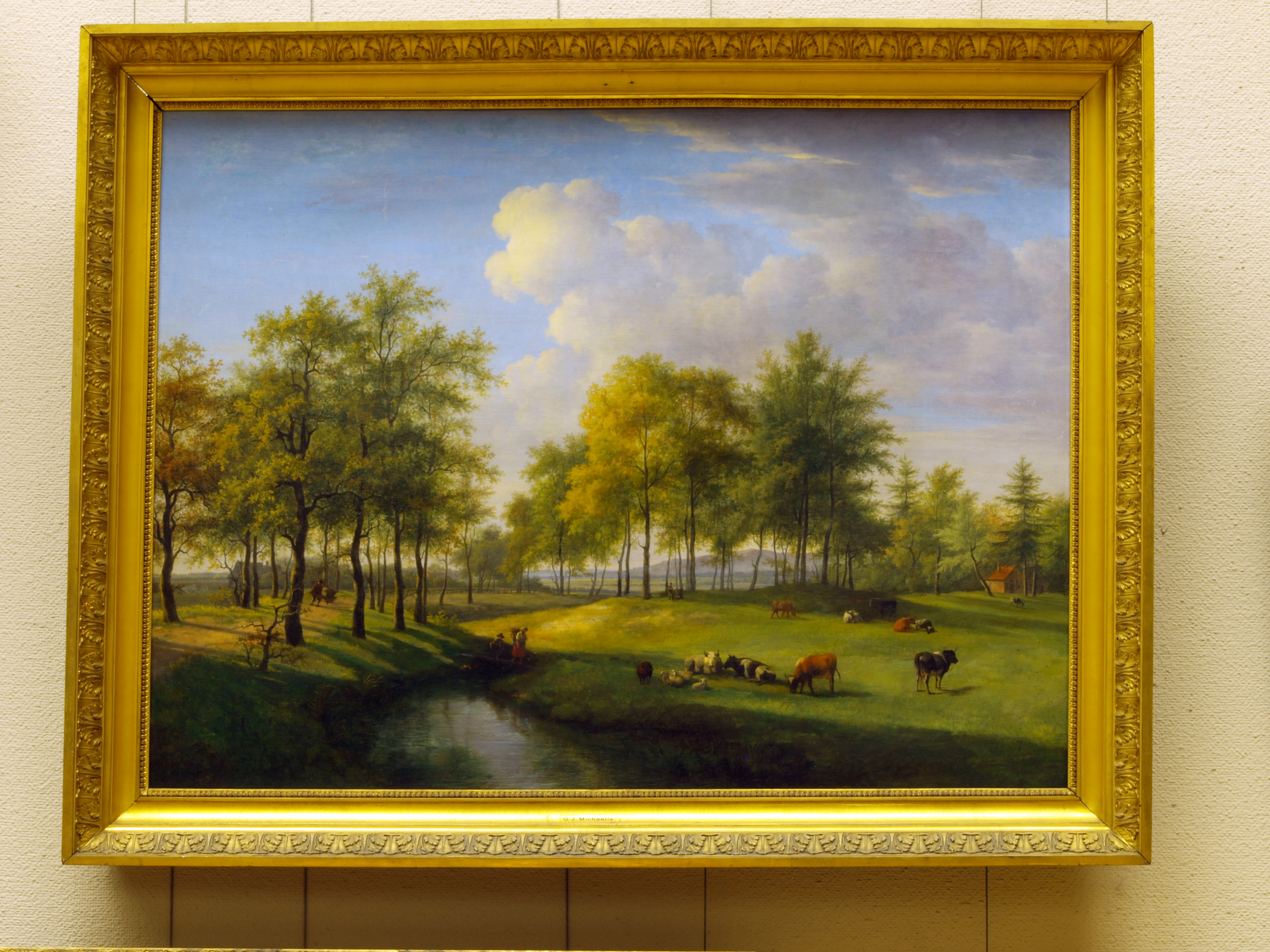
Gerrit Jan Michaëlis

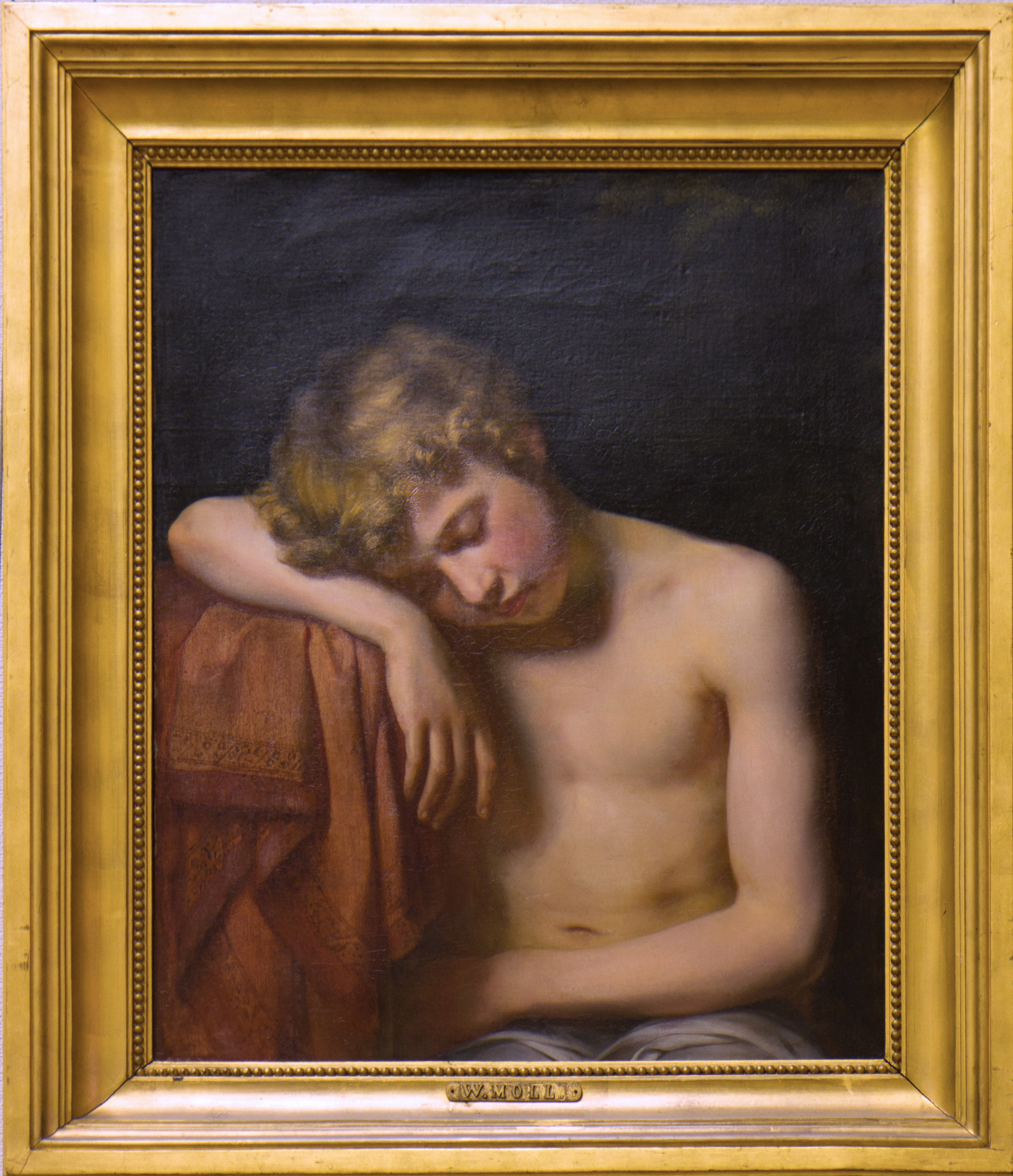
Woutherus Mol

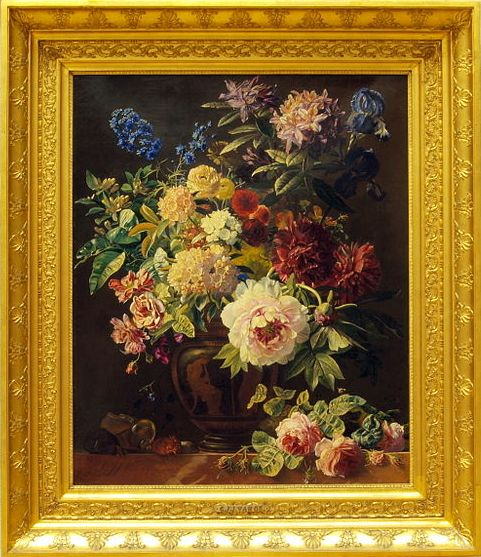
Georgius Jacobus Johannes van Os

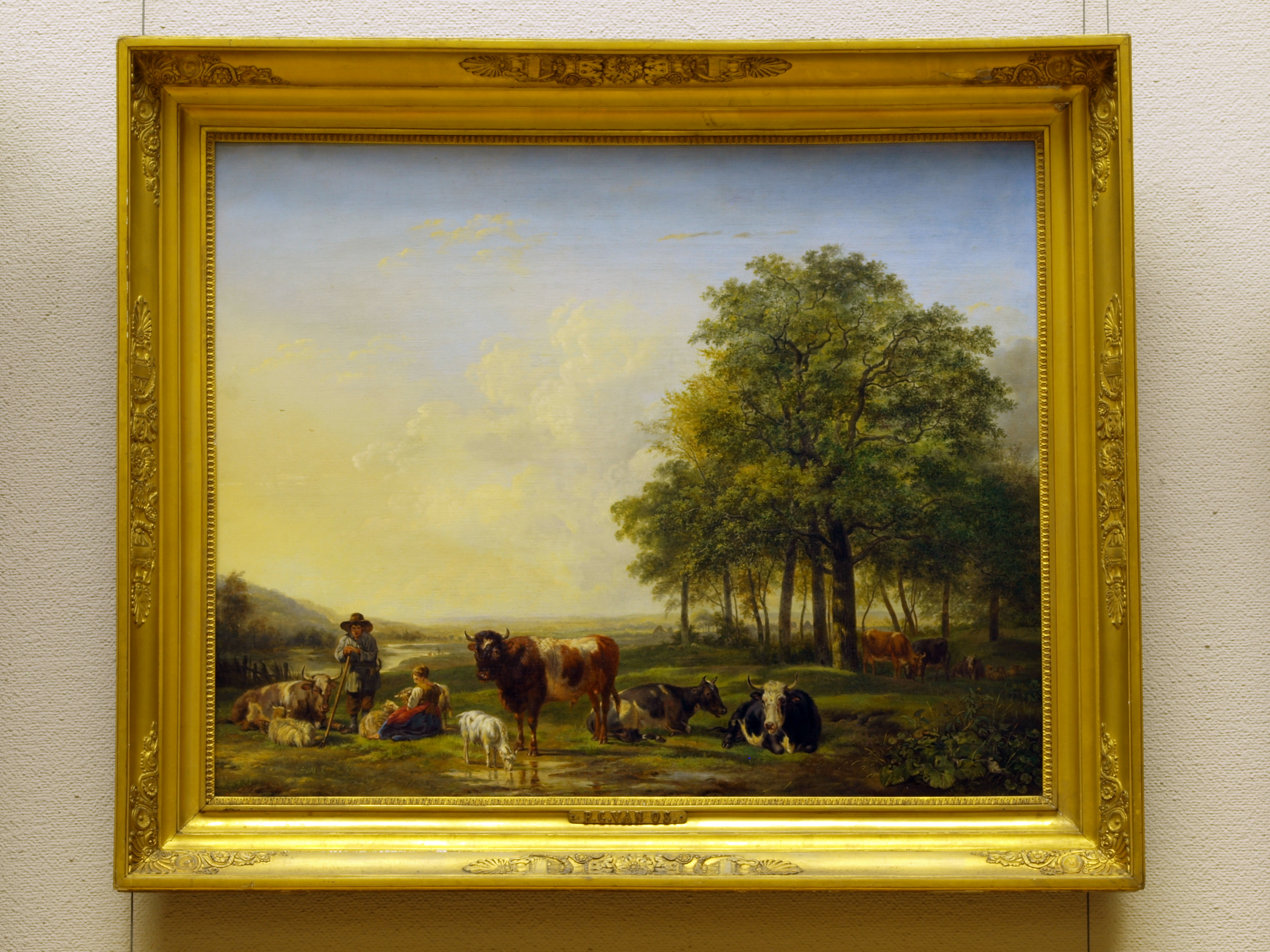
Pieter Gerardus van Os

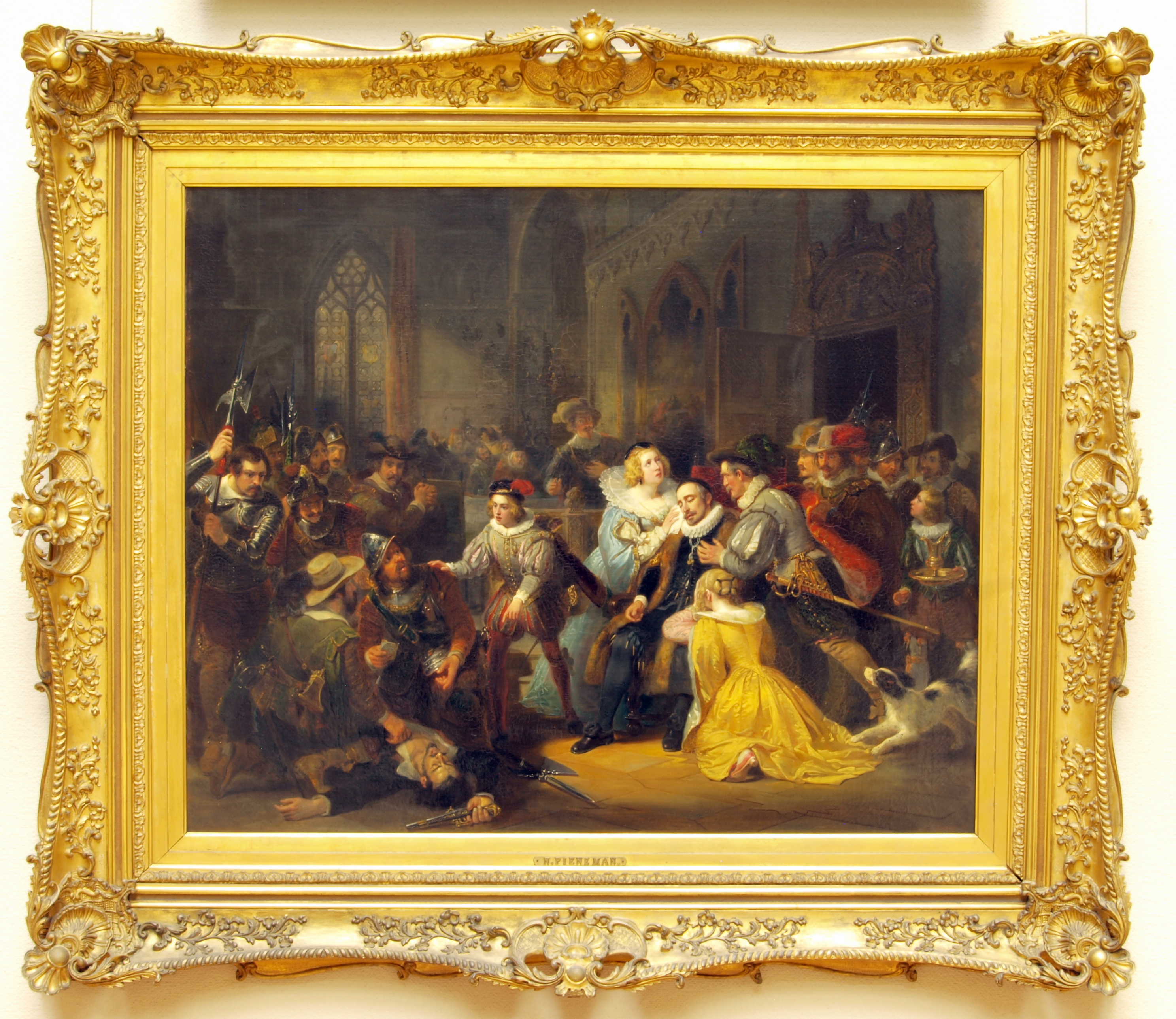
Nicolaas Pieneman

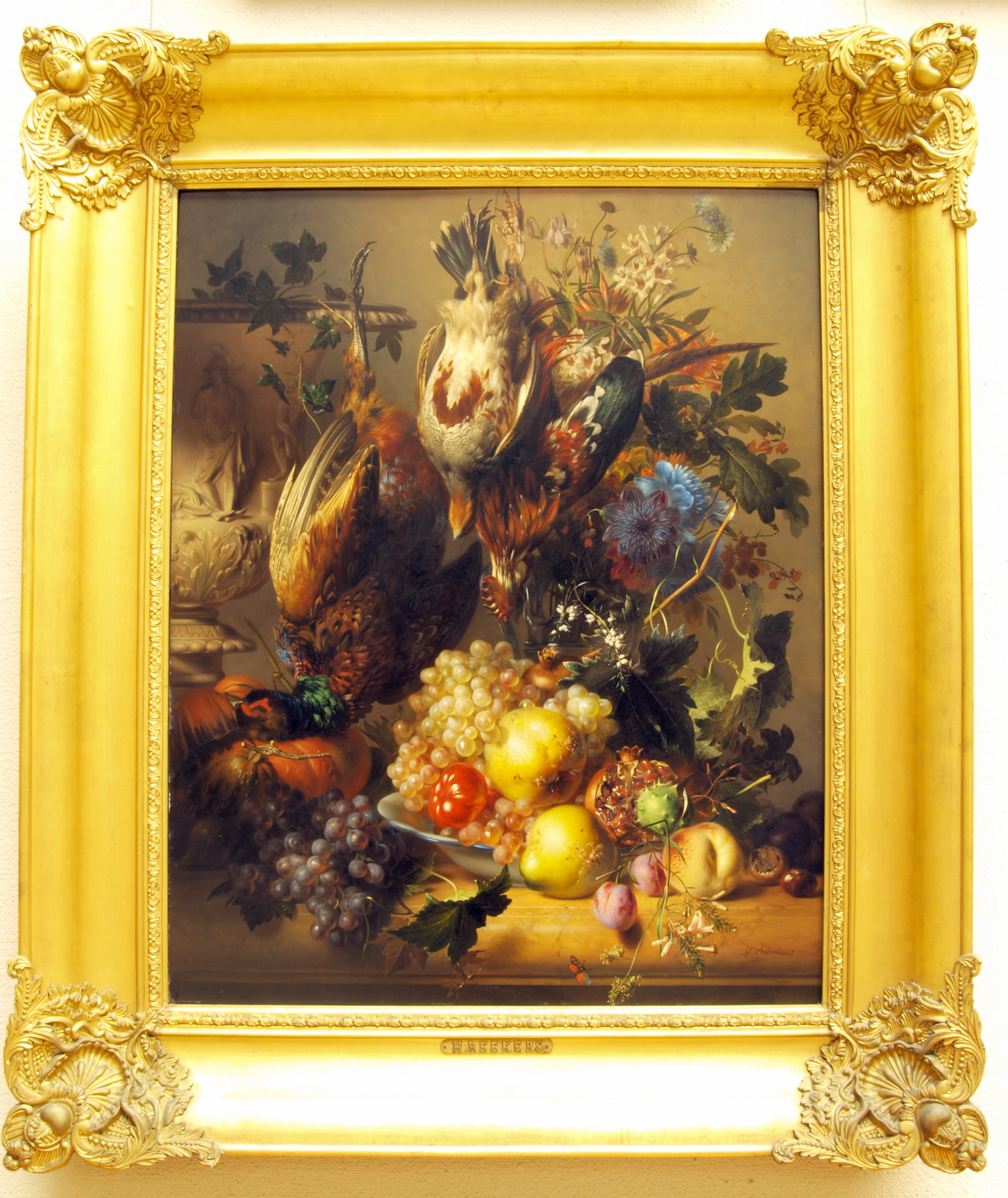
Hendrik Reekers

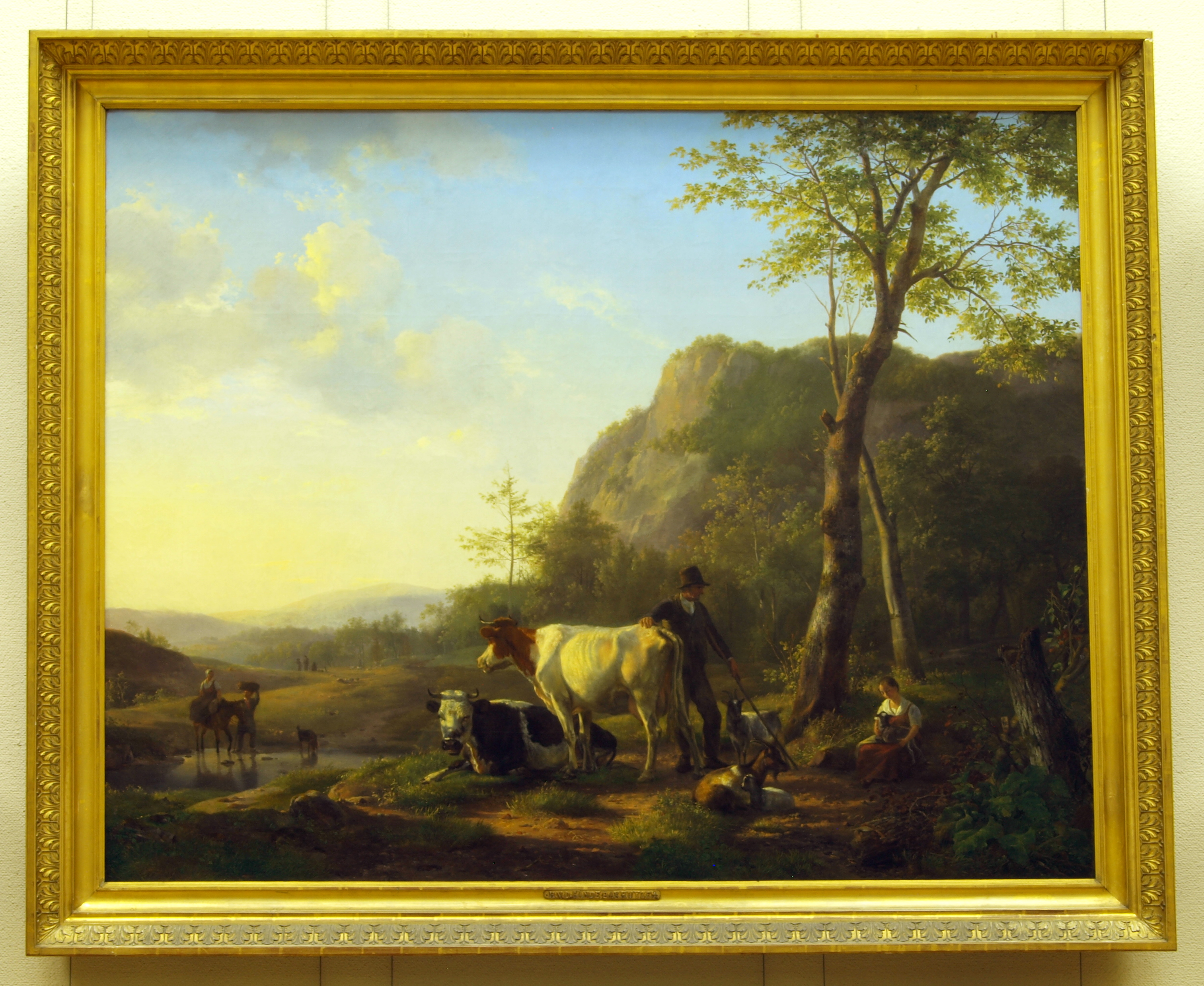
Hendrik van de Sande Bakhuyzen

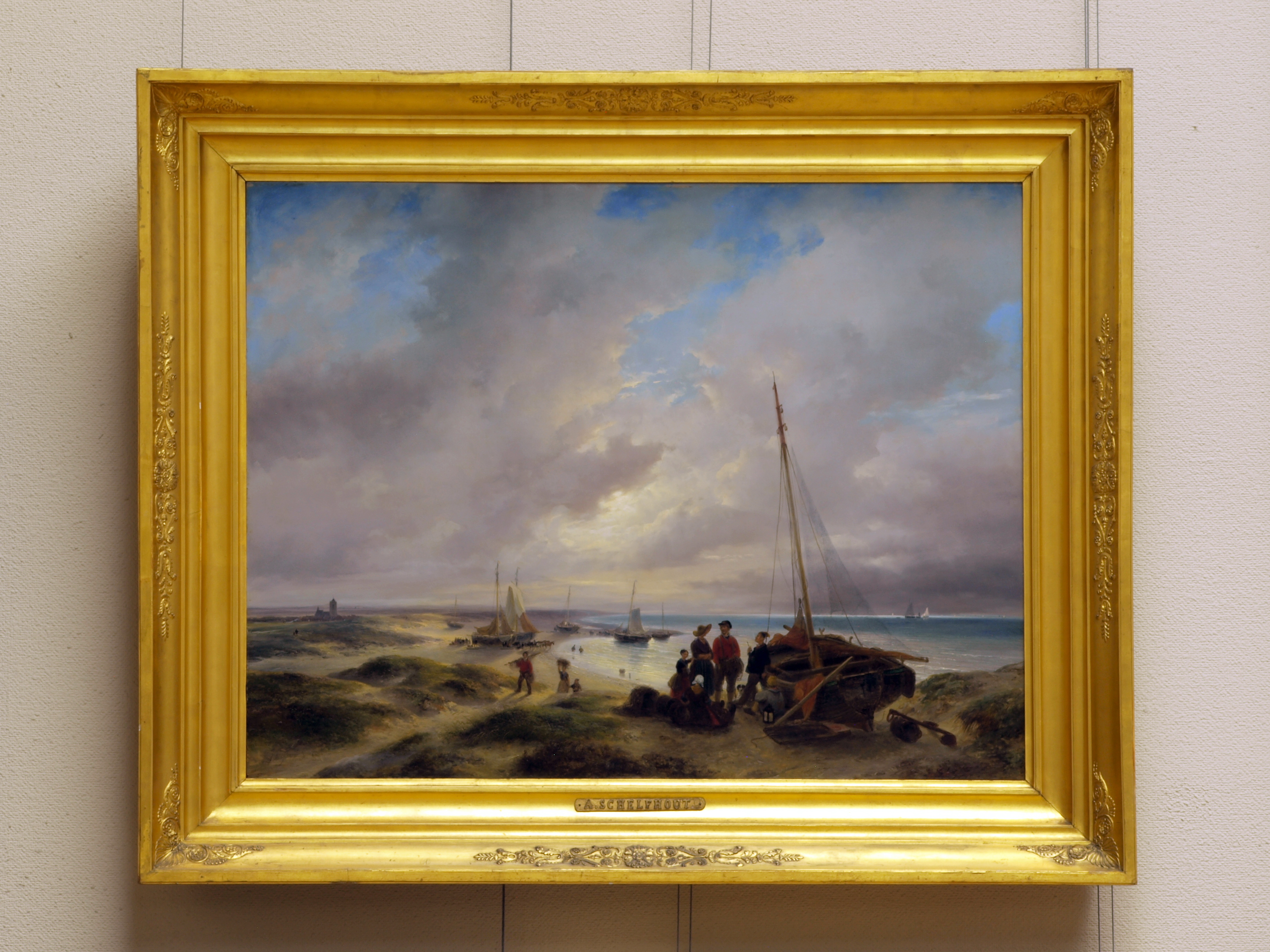
Andreas Schelfhout

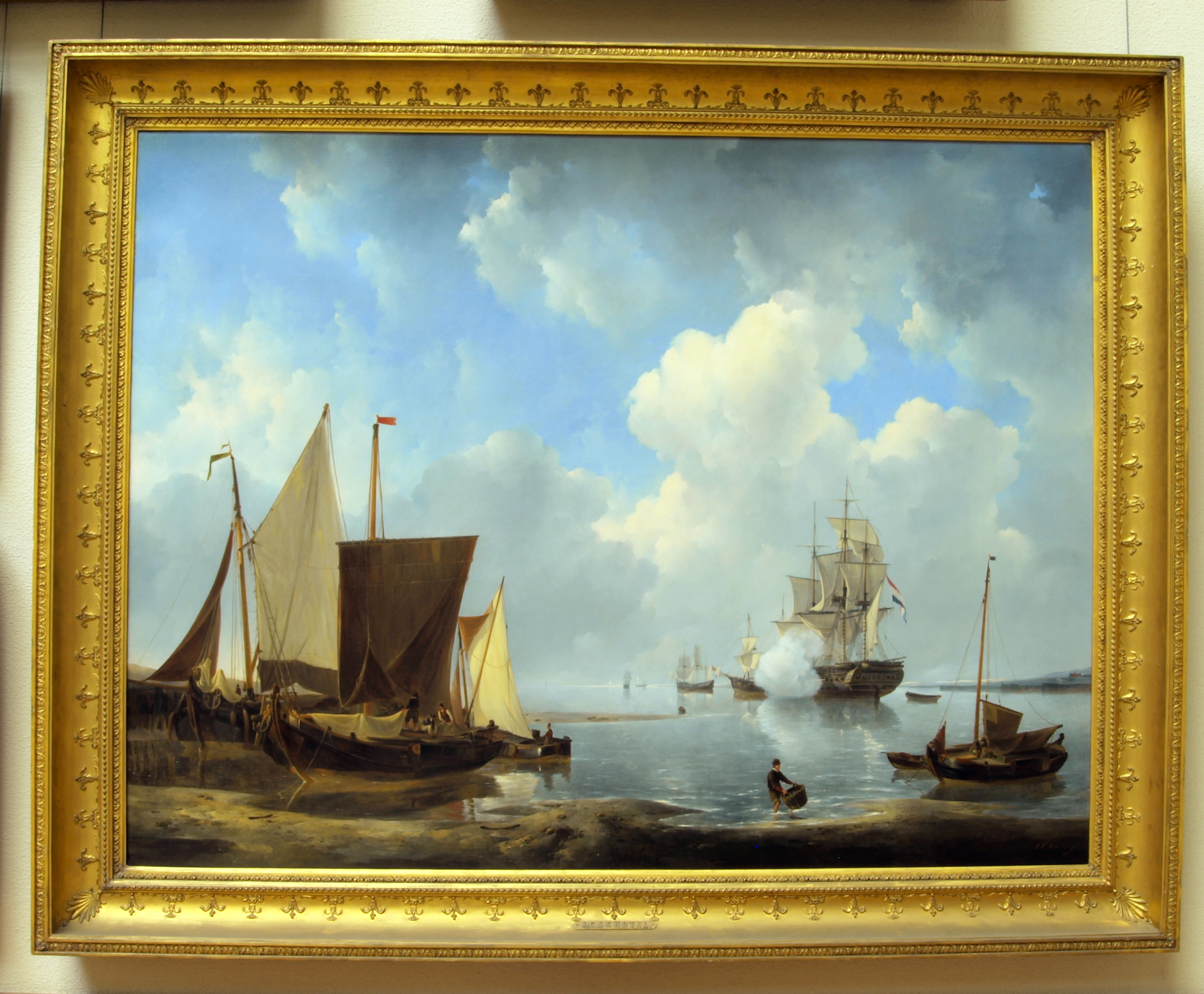
Johannes Christiaan Schotel

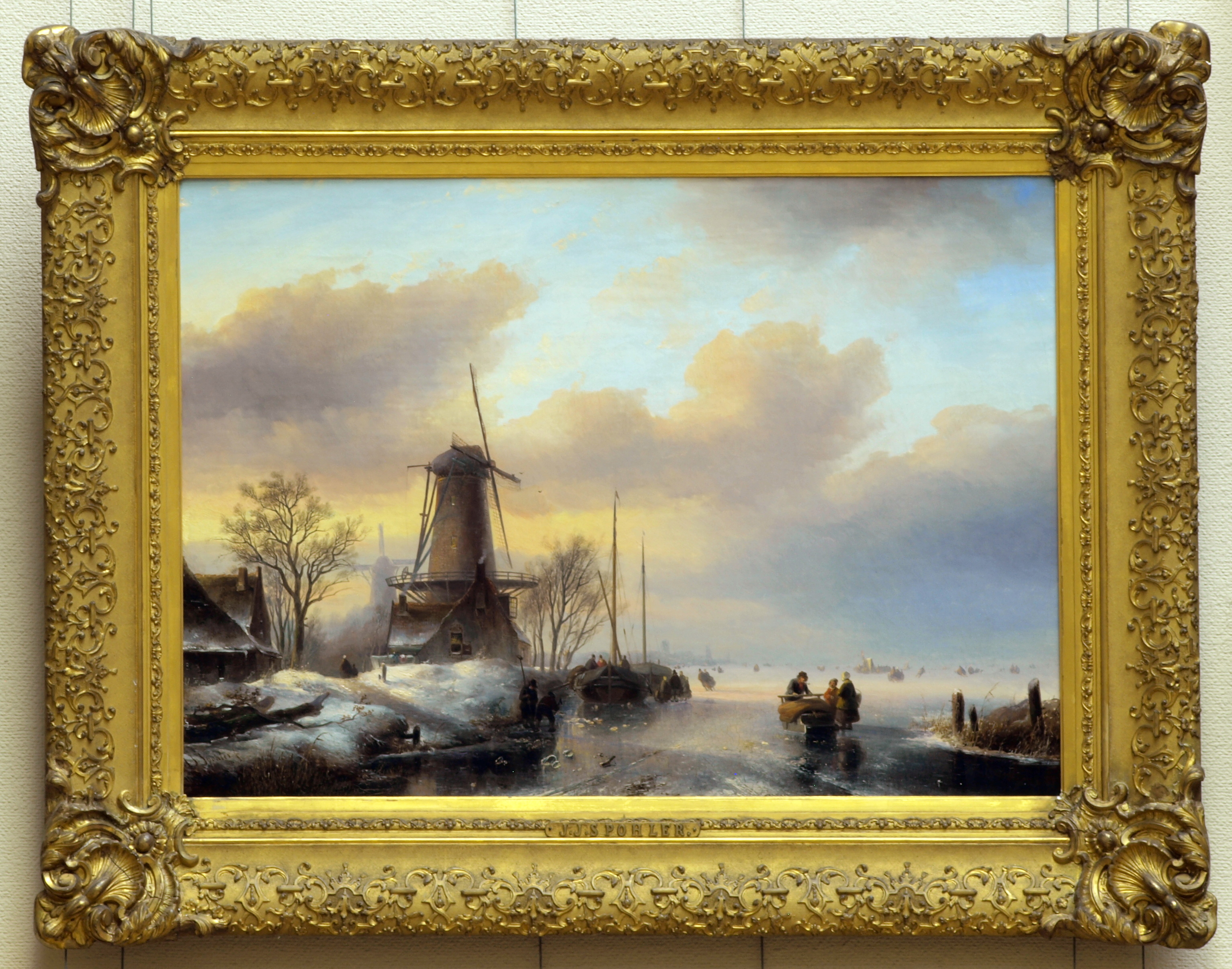
Jan Jacob Spohler

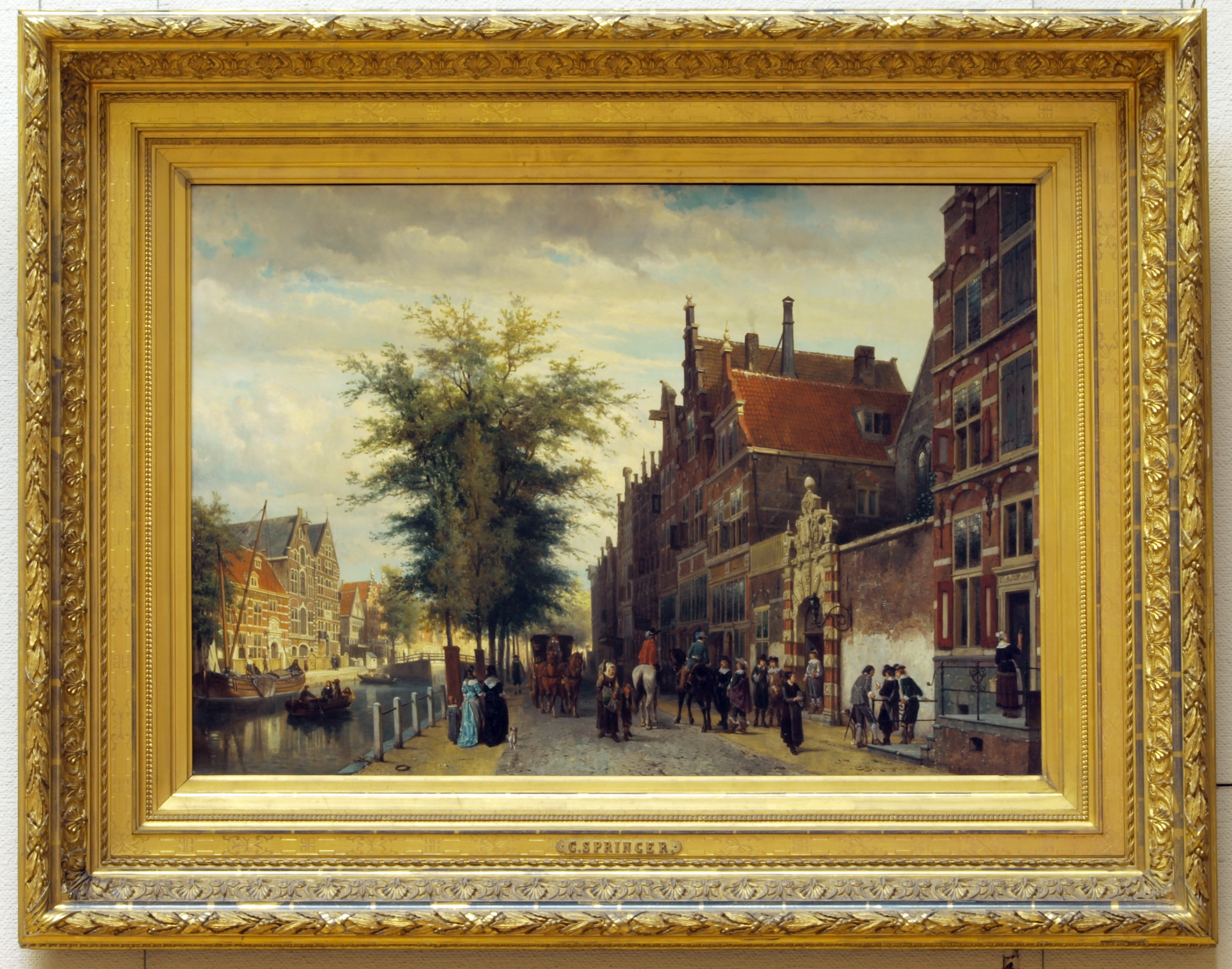
Cornelis Springer

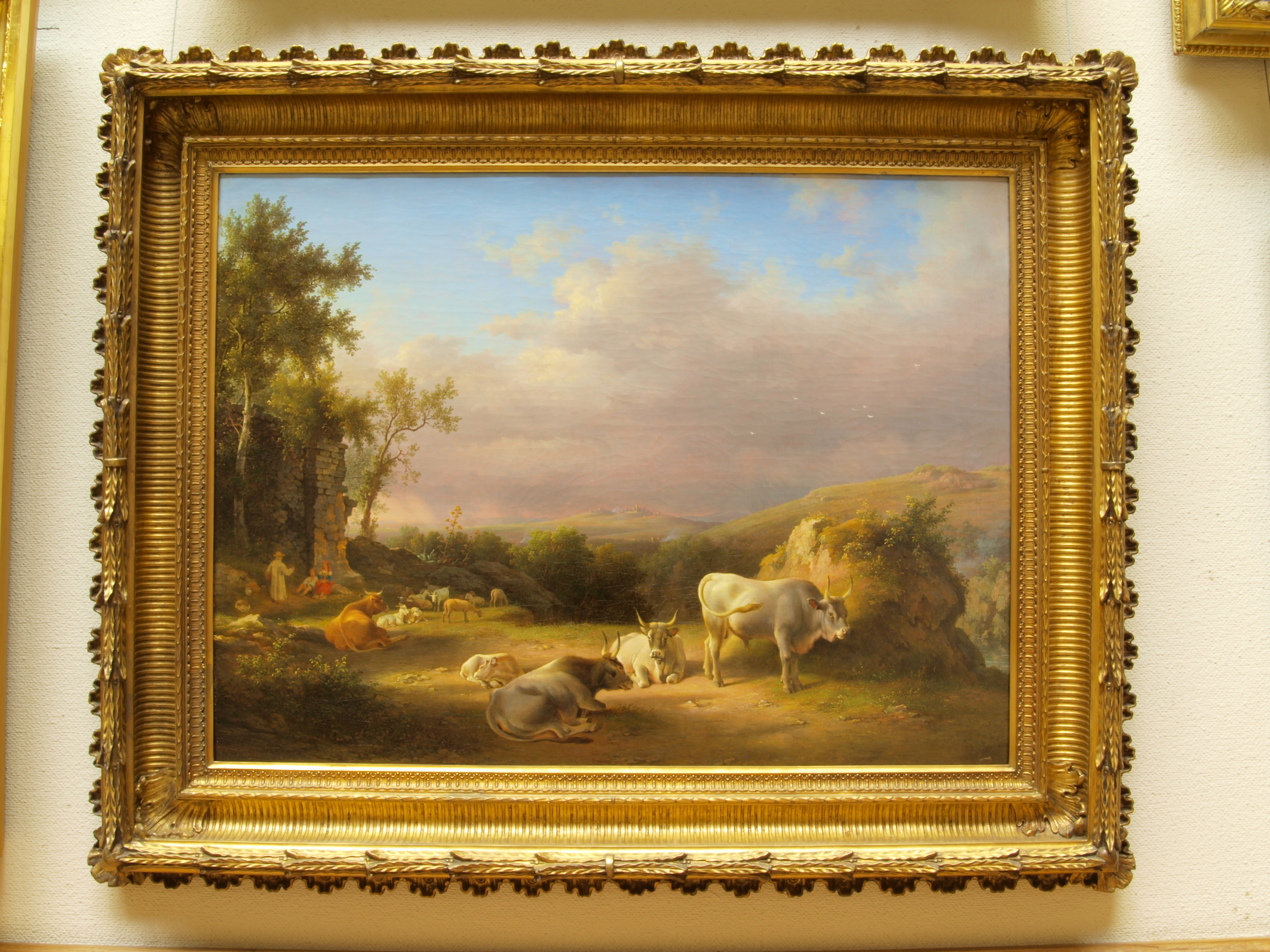
Abraham Teerlink

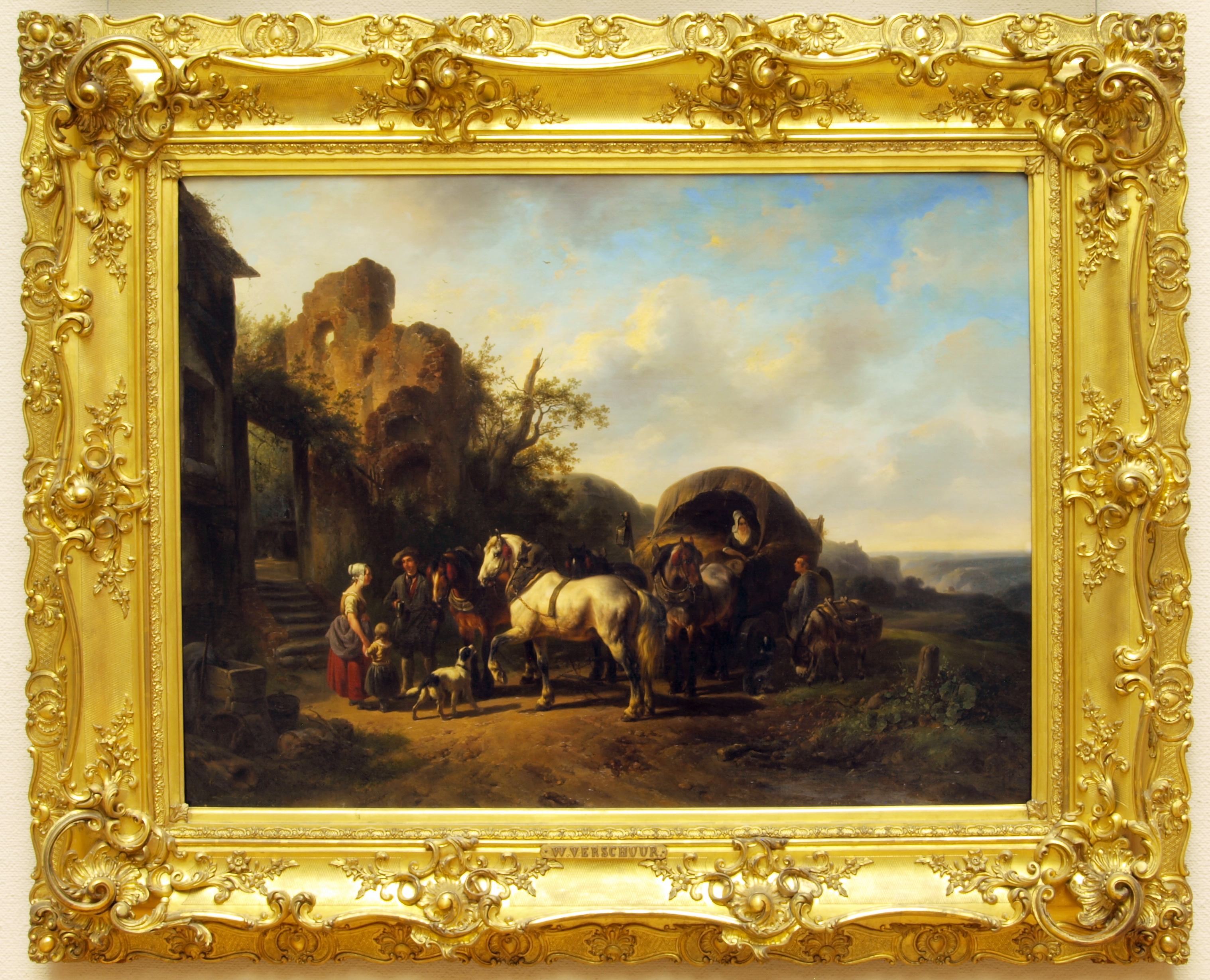
Wouterus Verschuur

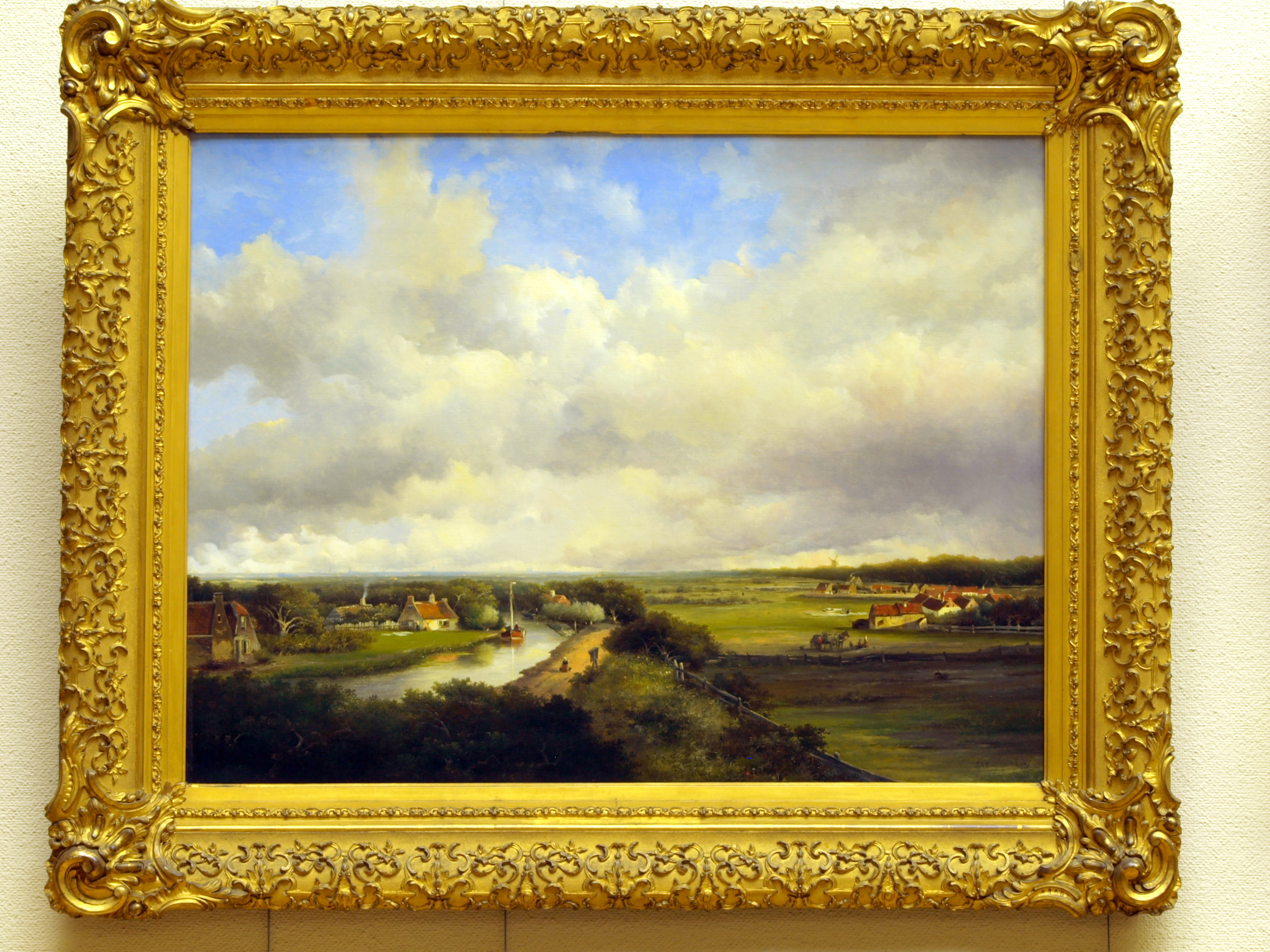
Jan Hendrik Weissenbruch
