= Hendrik (given name) =

Male given name

- Gender: Male
- Language: Dutch

Origin
- Origin: Netherlands
- Meaning: Home ruler

Other names
- Nicknames: Han; Hein; Henk; Hen; Hennie; Henny; Henrie; Henry; Hendrie; Hendry; Rijk; Rik; Ric; Rick; Ricky; Rickie
- Related names: Henderikus; Hendericus; Hendrikus; Hendrickus; Henricus; Henderickus

Hendrik is a given name of Dutch origin, and a cognate to the English Henry. The spelling Hendrick or Henderick was interchangeable until the 19th century. Birth names of people with this name can be Latinized to Henderickus, Hendricus, Hendrikus, or Henricus, while common nicknames for Hendrik are Han, Hein, Henk, Hen, Hennie, Henny, Henrie, Henry, Hendrie, Hendry, Rijk, Ric, Rick, Ricky, Rickie, and Rik. People with Hendrik, Henderick, or Hendrick as their first name include:

== Academics ==
- Hendrik Willem Bakhuis Roozeboom (1854–1907), Dutch physical chemist
- Hendrik Pieter Barendregt (born 1947), Dutch logician
- Hendrik Wade Bode (1905–1982), American engineer, researcher, inventor, author and scientist
- Hendrik Wilhelm Bodewitz (1939–2022), Dutch Sanskrit scholar
- Hendrik Enno Boeke (1881–1918), Dutch mineralogist and petrographer.
- Hendrik Jan Maarten Bos (1940–2024), Dutch historian of mathematics
- Hendrik Brugmans (1906–1997), Dutch literary theorist and linguist
- Hendrik Casimir (1909–2000), Dutch physicist known for the Casimir effect
- Hendrik Constantijn Cras (1739–1820), Dutch jurist and librarian
- Hendrik van Eikema Hommes (1930–1984), Dutch legal scholar and philosopher
- Hendrik van Etten (1591–1670), Pseudonym of Jean Leurechon, French mathematician
- Hendrik C. Ferreira (born 1950s), South African information scientist
- Hendrik van der Flier (born 1945), Dutch psychologist
- Hendrik Marinus Franken (born 1966), Dutch engineer and enterprise architect
- Hendrik van Gent (1899–1947), Dutch astronomer
- Hendrik Jacob Hamaker (1844–1911), Dutch jurist
- Hendrik Hart (1935–2021), Dutch and Canadian philosopher
- Hendrik van Heuraet (1634–c. 1660), Dutch mathematician
- Hendrik Hondius I (1573–1650), Flemish-born Dutch engraver, cartographer and publisher
- Hendrik Hondius II (1597–1651), Dutch engraver, cartographer and publisher
- Hendrik S. Houthakker (1924–2008), Dutch and American economist
- Hendrik C. van de Hulst (1918–2000), Dutch astronomer and mathematician
- Hendrik Kern (1833–1917), Dutch linguist and Orientalist
- Hendrik Johan Kessels (1781–1849), Dutch-born clock and naval chronometer maker
- Hendrik Kloosterman (1900–1968), Dutch mathematician
- Hendrik Anthony Kramers (1894–1952), Dutch physicist
- Hendrik Laas (1862–1919), Estonian agriculturalist and publisher
- Hendrik Lenstra (born 1949), Dutch mathematician
- Hendrik Lorentz (1853–1928), Dutch physicist and Nobel Laureate
- Hendrik de Moy (1534–1610), Secretary of Antwerp.
- Hendrik Nienhuis (1790–1862), Dutch legal scholar and university president
- Hendrik Poinar (born 1969), Dutch evolutionary biologist
- Hendrick van den Putte (1574–1646), Dutch humanist and philologist
- Hendrick Peter Godfried Quack (1834–1917), Dutch legal scholar, economist and historian
- Hendrik Relve (born 1948), Estonian environmentalist, nature writer and nature photographer
- Hendrik van Rheede (1636–1691), Dutch colonial governor and botanist
- Hendrik van Riessen (1911–2000), Dutch philosopher
- Hendrik van Rijgersma (1835–1877), Dutch naturalist and botanist
- Hendrik de Roy (1598–1679), Dutch philosopher and physician
- Hendrik Gerard van de Sande Bakhuyzen (1838–1923), Dutch astronomer
- Hendrik Sepp (1888–1943), Estonian historian
- Hendrik Schatz (born c.1970), German nuclear astrophysicist
- Hendrik Schön (born 1970), German physicist accused of fraud
- Hendrik G. Stoker (1899–1993), South African Calvinist philosopher
- Hendrik Tennekes (1936–2021), Dutch meteorologist
- Hendrik C. Tijms (born 1944), Dutch mathematician
- Hendrik Tolman (born 1961), Dutch and American civil engineer and oceanographer
- Hendrik Van Brussel (born 1944), Belgian mechanical engineer
- Hendrik W. (H.W.) van der Merwe (1929–2001), South African academic and anti-apartheid activist
- Hendrik Albertus van der Vorst (born 1944), Dutch mathematician
- Hendrik Wagenvoort (1886–1976), Dutch classical scholar
- Hendrik Johannes van der Windt (born 1955), Dutch environmental scientist
- Hendrik de Wit (1909–1999), Dutch systematic botanist
- Hendrik Wyermars (1685–1757), Dutch atheist philosopher
- Hendrik Zwaardemaker (1857–1930), Dutch physiologist who invented the olfactometer

== Arts ==
- Hendrik Abbé (1639–c.1680), Flemish painter, engraver and architect
- Hendrick Aerts (c.1570–1603), Flemish painter and draftsman
- Hendrik Christian Andersen (1872–1940), Norwegian-American sculptor, painter and urban planner
- Hendrick Andriessen (1607–1655), Flemish still-life painter
- Hendrick van Anthonissen (1605–1656), Dutch seascape painter
- Hendrik-Jozef Antonissen (1737–1794), Flemish painter of landscapes and cattle
- Hendrick Avercamp (1585–1634), Dutch landscape and genre painter
- Hendrick van Balen (c.1574–1632), Flemish Baroque painter and stained glass designer
- Hendrick van Balen the Younger (1623–1661), Flemish history painter
- Hendrik Bary (1632–1707), Dutch engraver
- Hendrick Berckman (1629–1679), Dutch portrait painter
- Hendrik Petrus Berlage (1856–1934), Dutch architect
- Hendrik Beyaert (1823–1894), Belgian architect
- Hendrick Bloemaert (1601–1672), Dutch portrait and historical painter
- Hendrick Bogaert (1630–1675), Dutch genre painter
- Hendrik van der Borcht the Elder (1583–1651), Flemish engraver and still life painter
- Hendrik van der Borcht II (1614–1676), German Baroque painter
- Hendrik van Borssum Buisman (1873–1951), Dutch painter and museum curator
- Hendrick van den Broeck (c.1530–1597), Flemish Mannerist painter
- Hendrick ter Brugghen (1588–1629), Dutch Caravaggist painter
- Hendrick van der Burgh (1627–aft.1664), Dutch genre painter
- Hendrik Carré (1656–1721), Dutch painter
- Hendrik Carré II (1696–1775), Dutch painter
- Hendrik Chabot (1894–1949), Dutch painter and sculptor
- Hendrik Claudius (c.1655–c.1700), German-born natural history illustrator
- Hendrick de Clerck (c.1560–1630), Flemish Mannerist painter
- Hendrick van Cleve III (c.1525–c.1595), Flemish painter and engraver
- Hendrick Coning (1604–1660), Dutch portrait painter
- Hendrik Frans de Cort (1742–1810), Flemish landscape painter
- Hendrick Couturier (1620–1684), Dutch portrait painter and settler in New Netherland
- Hendrick Danckerts (c.1625–1680), Dutch landscape painter and engraver
- Hendrik Adriaan Christiaan Dekker (1836–1905), Dutch painter and lithographer
- Hendrick Joseph Dillens (1812–1872), Belgian genre painter
- Hendrik Berend Dorgelo (1894–1961), Dutch physicist and academic
- Hendrick Dubbels (1621–1707), Dutch seascape painter
- Hendrik Faydherbe (1574–1629), Flemish sculptor, gilder, and poet
- Hendrick Fromantiou (1633–1693), Dutch still life painter
- Hendrik Goltzius (1558–1617), Dutch printmaker, draftsman, and painter
- Hendrick Goudt (1583–1648), Dutch landscape and biblical painter
- Hendrik Graauw (1627–1693), Dutch painter
- Hendrik-Jan Grievink (born 1977), Dutch graphic designer and editor
- Hendrik van der Haert (1790–1846), Flemish portrait painter, sculptor, illustrator and engraver
- Hendrik Handloegten (born 1968), German filmmaker
- Hendrik Heerschop (1626–1690), Dutch painter
- Hendrik Herregouts (1633–1704), Flemish history and portrait painter and draughtsman
- Hendrik Peter Jonker (1912–2002), Dutch photographer
- Hendrik Kerstens (born 1956), Dutch photographer and visual artist
- Hendrik Keun (1738–1787), Dutch city and landscape painter
- Hendrick de Keyser (1565–1631), Dutch sculptor and architect
- Hendrik Kobell (1751–1779), Dutch sea and landscape painter
- Hendrik Pieter Koekkoek (1843–1927), Dutch landscape painter
- Hendrik Maarten Krabbé (1868–1931), Dutch genre and portrait painter
- Hendrik Krawen (born 1963), German visual and installation artist
- Hendrick Krock (1671–1738), Danish history painter
- Hendrik Krumm (1934–1989), Estonian operatic tenor and voice teacher
- Hendrik van Limborch (1681–1759), Dutch painter and engraver
- Hendrik Frans van Lint (1684–1763), Flemish landscape painter
- Hendrik Luyten (1859–1945), Dutch-born Belgian painter
- Hendrik Martz (born 1968), German actor
- Hendrick de Meijer (1620–1689), Dutch landscape painter
- Hendrik de Meijer (1744–1793), Dutch wallpaper painter
- Hendrik Willem Mesdag (1831–1915), Dutch seascape painter
- Hendrik van Minderhout (1632–1696), Dutch-Flemish seascape painter
- Hendrick Mommers (1623–1693), Dutch landscape painter
- Hendrik Munnichhoven (died 1664), Swedish court painter
- Hendrick Munniks (c.1600–1664), Dutch painter
- Hendrik H.J. Ngantung (1921–1991), Indonesian painter and politician
- Hendrick ten Oever (1639–1716), Dutch painter
- Hendrik van Oort (1775–1847), Dutch landscape painter
- Hendrik Gerritsz Pot (c.1580–1657), Dutch genre and portrait painter
- Hendrik Pothoven (1725–1807), Dutch drawer and painter
- Hendrik Reekers (1815–1854), Dutch still life painter
- Hendrik Rietschoof (1678–1747), Dutch seascape painter
- Hendrik van de Sande Bakhuyzen (1795–1860), Dutch landscape painter
- Hendrik Frans Schaefels (1827–1904), Belgian Romantic painter, draughtsman and engraver
- Hendrik Adolf Schaep (1826–1870), Belgian seascape painter
- Hendrik Scheffer (1798–1862), Dutch Romantic painter who lived in France
- Hendrik Jacobus Scholten (1824–1907), Dutch painter
- Hendrik Schoock (1630–1707), Dutch history and still life painter
- Hendrik Willem Schweickhardt (1747–1797), German landscape painter
- Hendrick Snyers (1611–1644), Flemish engraver
- Hendrick van Someren (c.1610–1685), Dutch painter
- Hendrick Sorgh (1666–1720), Dutch broker and art collector
- Hendrik Martensz Sorgh (c.1610–1670), Dutch genre painter
- Hendrik Spilman (1721–1784), Dutch painter and engraver
- Hendrik van Steenwijk I (c.1550–1603), Dutch architectural painter
- Hendrik van Steenwijk II (c.1580–1640), Dutch architectural, biblical and still life painter
- Hendrick van Streeck (1659–1720), Dutch architectural painter
- Hendrik Tavenier (1734–1807), Dutch landscape draughtsman and painter
- Henricus Jacobus Tollens (1864-1936), Dutch photographer
- Hendrick van Uylenburgh (1587–1661), Dutch art dealer
- Hendrik Veen (1823–1905), Dutch photographer in the Dutch East Indies
- Hendrik Frans Verbrugghen (1654–1724), Flemish sculptor and draftsman
- Hendrik Vermeulen (born 1982), South African fashion designer
- Hendrik Verschuring (1627–1690), Dutch landscape painter
- Hendrick Cornelisz van Vliet (1611–1675), Dutch architectural painter
- Hendrik Voogd (1768–1839), Dutch landscape painter and printmaker
- Hendrick Cornelisz Vroom (1562–1640), Dutch seascape painter
- Hendrik Nicolaas Werkman (1882–1945), Dutch experimental artist, typographer and printer
- Hendrik Wouda (1885–1946), Dutch architect and furniture designer
- Hendrik Emil Wouters (1882–1916), Belgian fauvist painter and sculptor
- Hendrik van Wueluwe (1460–c.1533), Flemish Renaissance painter

== Business ==
- Hendrik Adriaan van Beuningen (1841–1908), Dutch businessman and politician
- Hendrik van der Bijl (1887–1948), South African electrical engineer and industrialist
- Hendrick van Buyten (1632–1701), Dutch baker
- Hendrik Carloff (c.1621–c.1690), Swedish slave trader
- Hendrik Godfried Duurkoop (1736–1778), Dutch merchant-trader and VOC Opperhoofd in Japan
- Hendrik Figee (1838–1907), Dutch cranes manufacturer
- Hendrik G. Meijer (born 1952), American CEO of the supermarket chain Meijer
- Hendrik Pasma (1813–1890), Dutch writer, farmer and politician
- Hendrik Pontoppidan (1814–1901), Danish merchant, consul and philanthropist
- Hendrik Caspar Romberg (1744–1793), Dutch bookkeeper, merchant-trader and VOC Opperhoofd in Japan
- Hendrick van Rensselaer (1667–1740), New York colony landowner

== Exploration ==
- Hendrik Brouwer (1581–1653), Dutch explorer, admiral, and colonial administrator
- Hendrick Christiaensen (died 1616), Dutch explorer
- Hendrik Coetzee (c.1975–2010), South African explorer
- Hendrik Dolleman (1905–1990), Dutch-born American Air Force serviceman and explorer
- Hendrick Jacobs Falkenberg (c.1640–1712), German interpreter in New Netherland and New Sweden
- Hendrick Hamel (1630–1692), Dutch journalist and explorer
- Hendrik Hudson (c.1565–1611), Dutch contemporary name for the English explorer
- Hendrik Albertus Lorentz (1871–1944), Dutch explorer of New Guinea
- Hendrik Pieter Nicolaas Muller (1859–1941), Dutch businessman, diplomat, explorer, publicist, and philanthropist
- Hendrik Jacob Wikar (1752–?), Finnish explorer
- Hendrik van Zyl (1828–1880), First Afrikaner settler in Botswana

== Military ==
- Hendrik van den Bergh (1573–1638), Dutch count, who served in the Spanish military
- Hendrik Born (1944–2021), East German Navy vice admiral
- Hendrik Bosch (1776–aft.1840), Dutch military officer and Governor of the Dutch Gold Coast
- Hendrik G.B. van den Breemen (born 1941), Dutch Marine Corps generals
- Hendrik Detmers (1761–1825), Dutch military commander at Waterloo
- Hendrik Gravé (1670–1749), Dutch admiral
- Hendrick van der Heul (1676–1762), Dutch privateer
- Hendrik Klopper (1903–1977), South African military commander
- Hendrik A. Kotze (1919–?), South African Army general
- Hendrik Merkus de Kock (1779–1845), Dutch military general, minister, and senator
- Hendrick Lonck (1568–1634), Dutch navy admiral
- Hendrik III of Nassau-Breda (1483–1538), Dutch stadtholder and military leader
- Hendrik van Nassau-Ouwerkerk (1640–1708), Dutch military general
- Hendrik George de Perponcher Sedlnitsky (1771–1856), Dutch general and diplomat
- Hendrik Prinsloo (1890–1966), South African military commander
- Hendrik Rusius (1624–1679), Dutch officer and fortification engineer
- Hendrik Seyffardt (1872–1943), Dutch general and Nazi collaborator
- Hendrick Sharp (1815–1892), Union Navy sailor in the American Civil War
- Hendrik Trajectinus, Count of Solms (1636–1693), Dutch lieutenant-general
- Hendrick K. van Rensselaer (1744–1816), American Colonel during the American Revolutionary War
- Hendrik Witbooi, chief of the ǀKhowesin people, a sub-tribe of the Khoekhoe, regarded as one of the national heroes of Namibia, one of the principal commanders of Herero Wars

== Music ==
- Hendrik Andriessen (1892–1981), Dutch composer and organist
- Hendrik Herman Badings (1907–1987), Dutch composer
- Hendrik Bouman (born 1951), Dutch harpsichordist, conductor and composer
- Hendrik Bredeniers (c.1472–1522), Flemish organist and music teacher
- Hendrik Hofmeyr (born 1957), South African composer
- Hendrik Möbus (born 1976), German Neo Nazi and heavy metal musician
- Hendrik Niehoff (1495–1561), Dutch pipe organ builder
- Hendrik Sal-Saller (born 1966), Estonian rock singer and guitarist
- Hendrik N.T. Simons (born 1955), Dutch singer
- Hendrik Speuy (c.1575–1625), Dutch renaissance organist and composer
- Hendrik Stedler (born 1968), German sound designer, audio engineer and song composer

== Politics and government ==
- Hendrik Allik (1901–1989), Estonian communist politician
- Hendrik Becker (1661–1722), Dutch Governor of Ceylon
- Hendrik Beernink (1910–1979), Dutch Minister of the Interior
- Hendrick van Berckenrode (c.1565–1534), Dutch mayor of Haarlem portrayed by Frans Hals
- Hendrik van Boeijen (1889–1947), Dutch Minister of Defence and the Interior
- Hendrik Bogaert (born 1968), Flemish politician
- Hendrik I of Brabant (1165–1235), Duke of Brabant and Lothier
- Hendrik II van Brabant (1207–1248), Duke of Brabant and Lothier
- Hendrick van Brederode (1531–1568), Dutch noble and early leader of the Dutch Revolt
- Hendrik Brouwer (1581–1653), Dutch explorer, admiral, and Governor-General of the East Indies
- Hendrik Casimir I of Nassau-Dietz (1612–1640), Dutch stadtholder of Friesland, Groningen and Drenthe
- Hendrik Casimir II of Nassau-Dietz (1657–1696), Dutch stadtholder of Friesland and Groningen
- Hendrik Chin A Sen (1934–1999), Surinamese politician, President of Suriname 1980-82
- Hendrik Colijn (1869–1944), Prime Minister of the Netherlands
- Hendrik Cornelis (1910–1999), Belgian Governor-General of the Belgian Congo
- Hendrik Daems (born 1959), Flemish politician
- Hendrik Davi (born 1977), French politician
- Hendrik de Man (1882–1953), Belgian Labour Party politician
- Hendrik Doeff (1764–1837), Dutch diplomat in Japan
- Hendrik Lodewijk Drucker (1857–1917), Dutch liberal politician
- Hendrick S. Holden (1849–1918), American politician and banker from New York
- Hendrik Jan van Duren (1937–2008), Dutch politician
- Hendrik Elias (1902–1973), Belgian politician and Flemish nationalist
- Hendrik Fernandez (1932–2014), Indonesian Governor of West Timor
- Hendrick Fisher (1697–1779), New Jersey colonial politician
- Hendrick V. Fisher (1846-1909), American politician
- Hendrik Goeman Borgesius (1847–1917), Dutch Minister of the Interior
- Hendrik Johannes Grashoff (born 1961), Dutch politician and civil engineer
- Hendrik of Guelders (1117–1182), Count of Guelders
- Hendrik Antonie Lodewijk Hamelberg (1826–1896), Dutch lawyer and politician in South Africa
- Hendrick Hansen (1665–1724), 5th Mayor of Albany, New York
- Hendrik ten Hoeve (born 1946), Dutch Senate member
- Hendrik Jan Hofstra (1904–1999), Dutch Labour Party politician
- Hendrik Hoppenstedt (born 1972), German politician
- Hendrick Hendricksen Kip (1600–1685), Dutch colonial magistrate in New Netherland
- Toomas Hendrik Ilves (born 1953), Estonian politician, fourth President of Estonia
- Hendrik Koekoek (1912–1987), Dutch farmer and politician
- Hendrik Elle Koning (1933–2016), Dutch tax official and politician
- Hendrik Menso (1791–1872), Dutch conservative politician
- Hendrik Mentz (1877–1938), South African Minister of Defence
- Hendrik Mulderije (1888–1970), Dutch Minister of Justice
- Hendrik Pieter Nicolaas Muller (1859–1941), Dutch businessman, diplomat, explorer, publicist, and philanthropist
- Hendrik of the Netherlands (1876–1934), Prince consort of the Netherlands, husband of Queen Wilhelmina
- Hendrick Vaal Neto (born 1944), Angolan diplomat
- Hendrik H.J. Ngantung (1921–1991), Indonesian painter and Governor of Jakarta
- Hendrik van der Noot (1731–1827), Brabant jurist, lawyer, politician and revolutionary
- Hendrik van Oranje-Nassau (1820–1879), Prince of the Netherlands, son of King William II
- Hendrick Petrusma (born 1942), Dutch-born Australian politician
- Hendrik Potgieter (1792–1852), South African Voortrekker leader
- Hendrik van Rheede (1636–1691), Dutch colonial governor and botanist
- Hendrik Jan Roethof (1921–1996), Dutch journalist and politician
- Hendrik van Rossum (1919–2017), Dutch politician
- Hendrick Schmidt (born 1963), South African politician
- Hendrik Jan Smidt (1831–1917), Dutch Governor-General of Suriname
- Hendrik Swellengrebel (1700–1760), Governor of the Dutch Cape Colony
- Hendrick Tejonihokarawa (c.1660–c.1735), Mohawk leader, one of the "Four Mohawk Kings"
- Hendrik Johannes Terras (born 1993), Estonian politician
- Hendrick Theyanoguin (1692–1755), Mohawk leader associated with Sir William Johnson
- Hendrik Tilanus (1884–1966), Dutch Christian politician
- Hendrik Tonneboeijer (1814–1837), Dutch Commander of the Dutch Gold Coast
- Hendrik Verwoerd (1901–1966), Prime Minister of South Africa and designer of the apartheid policy, one of the principal commanders of Rhodesian Bush War
- Hendrik J.H. Vonhoff (1931–2010), Dutch state secretary, mayor and Queens commissioner
- Hendrik Vos (1903–1972), Dutch Labour Party politician
- Hendrik Vroom (1850–1902), Gold Coast mulatto government official
- Hendrik Samuel Witbooi (1906–1978), Namibian Oorlam leader
- Hendrik Witbooi (1934–2009), Namibian Khoekhoe leader and politician
- Hendrik Witbooi (c.1830–1905), Namibian Khoekhoe leader
- Hendrick Bradley Wright (1808–1881), U.S. House of Representatives member from Pennsylvania
- Hendrik Jan Zeevalking (1922–2005), Dutch Minister of Transport and Water Management
- Hendrick Zwaardecroon (1667–1728), Dutch Governor-General of the Dutch East Indies

== Religion ==
- Hendrik van Ahuis (1371–1439), Dutch founder of the Brethren of the Common Life in Germany
- Hendrik Alting (1583–1644), Dutch-German theologian
- Hendrik de Cock (1801–1842), Dutch Calvinist minister
- Hendrick Joseph Cornelius Maria de Cocq (1906–1996), Dutch Catholic bishop in the South Pacific
- Hendrik Jan Elhorst (1861–1924), Dutch Mennonite teacher and minister
- Hendrik Arend van Gelder (1825–1899), Dutch Mennonite teacher and minister
- Hendrik Hanegraaff (born 1950), Dutch-born American Christian author and talk-show host
- Hendrik Herp (died 1477), Dutch or Flemish Franciscan mystic
- Hendrik Kraemer (1888–1965), Dutch Protestant missionary
- Hendrik Niclaes (1501–c.1580), German mystic
- Hendrik Pierson (1834–1923), Dutch Lutheran minister and social activist
- Hendrik Sumendap (born 1948), Indonesian Seventh-day Adventist leader
- Hendrik Swalmius (1577–1649), Dutch theologian

== Sports ==
- Hendrick Bertz (born 1988), German canoer
- Hendrik de Best (1905–1978), Dutch boxer
- Hendrik Bonmann (born 1994), German footballer
- Hendrik Egnatius Botha (born 1958), South African rugby player
- Hendrik Brocks (1942–2023), Indonesian cyclist
- Hendrik Buhrmann (born 1963), South African golfer
- Hendrik Cornelisse (born 1940), Dutch cyclist
- Hendrik Johannes Cruijff (1947–2016), Dutch footballer
- Hendrik Joseph Daniller (born 1984), South African rugby player
- Hendrik Jan Davids (born 1969), Dutch tennis player
- Hendrik Johannes Nicasius de Vries (born 1995), Dutch racing driver
- Hendrik Devos (born 1955), Belgian cyclist
- Hendrik Dippenaar (born 1977), South African cricketer
- Hendrik Dreekmann (born 1975), German tennis player
- Hendrik Elzerman (born 1958), Dutch swimmer
- Hendrik Feldwehr (born 1986), German swimmer
- Hendrik Geldenhuys (born 1983), Namibian cricketer
- Hendrik Maarten van Gent (born 1951), Dutch competitive sailor
- Hendrik van der Grift (born 1935), Dutch speed skater
- Hendrik de Grijff (1892–1976), Dutch sports shooter
- Hendrik Groot (1938–2022), Dutch footballer
- Hendrik Großöhmichen (born 1985), German footballer
- Hendrik Hagens (1900–1981), Dutch fencer
- Hendrik Hahne (born 1986), German footballer
- Hendrik Hansen (born 1994), German footballer
- Hendrik Jan Held (born 1967), Dutch volleyball player
- Hendrik Helmke (born 1987), German footballer
- Hendrik Herzog (born 1969), German football player and coach
- Hendrik van Heuckelum (1879–1929), Dutch footballer
- Hendrik Hordijk (1893–1975), Dutch footballer
- Hendrik de Iongh (1877–1962), Dutch fencer
- Hendrik Isemborghs (1914–1973), Belgian footballer
- Hendrik Pieter de Jongh (born 1970), Dutch football player and manager
- Hendrik Jung (born 1956), German fencer
- Hendrik Kersken (1880–1967), Dutch competitive sailor
- Hendrik Jan Kooijman (born 1960), Dutch field hockey player
- Hendrik Krediet (born 1942), Dutch modern pentathlete
- Hendrik Krüzen (born 1964), Dutch footballer
- Hendrik Pieter Le Roux (born 1967), South African rugby player
- Hendrik Christiaan de Looper (1912–2006), Dutch field hockey player
- Hendrik Marx (1989–2010), Namibian cricketer
- Hendrik Meijer (born 1959), Dutch taekwondo competitor and coach
- Hendrick Mokganyetsi (born 1975), South African sprinter
- Hendrik-Jan Mol (born 1977), Dutch cricketer
- Hendrik Mulder (born c.1975), South African rugby player
- Hendrik A.J. Muller (1887–1940), Dutch footballer
- Hendrik S.V. Muller (1922–1977), South African rugby player
- Hendrik Numan (1955–2018), Dutch judoka
- Hendrik Odendaal (born 1979), South African swimmer
- Hendrik Offerhaus (1875–1953), Dutch rower
- Hendrik Ooms (1916–1993), Dutch cyclist
- Hendrik J. Otto (born 1976), South African golfer
- Hendrik Pekeler (born 1991), German handball player
- Han Hendrik Piho (born 1993), Estonian Nordic combined skier
- Hendrick Ramaala (born 1972), South African long-distance runner
- Hendrik Redant (born 1962), Belgian cyclist and directeur sportif
- Hendrik Reiher (born 1962), East German rowing cox
- Hendrik Roodt (born 1987), South African rugby player
- Hendrik Wopke Rouwé (born 1946), Dutch rower
- Hendrik Rubeksen (born 1983), Faroese footballer
- Hendrik Schenk (born 1945), Dutch-born American Olympic wrestler
- Hendrik Scherpenhuijzen (1882–1971), Dutch fencer
- Hendrik Schoofs (born 1950), Belgian long-distance runner
- Hendrik Sirringhaus (born 1985), German ice hockey goaltender
- Hendrik Snoek (born 1948), German show jumper
- Hendrik Somaeb (born 1992), Namibian footballer
- Hendrik Starostzik (born 1991), German footballer
- Hendrik Starreveld (1914–2008), Dutch sprint canoer
- Hendrik Stroo (1927–1991), Dutch sprint canoer
- Hendrik C. van Suylekom (1904–1982), Dutch rower
- Hendrik Timmer (1904–1998), Dutch tennis and squash player
- Hendrik Timmer (born 1971), Dutch football goalkeeper
- Hendrik Tommelein (born 1962), Belgian hurdler
- Hendrik Adriaan Toonen (born 1954), Dutch water polo player
- Hendrik Tui (born 1987), New Zealand-born Japanese rugby player
- Hendrik Van Crombrugge (born 1993), Belgian footballer
- Hendrik Erasmus van der Dussen (born 1989), South African cricketer
- Hendrik Van Dijck (born 1974), Belgian road cyclist
- Hendrik Verbrugghe (1929–2009), Belgian sprint canoeist
- Hendrik van der Wal (1886–1982), Dutch running athlete
- Hendrick Waye (1877–1961), Australian rules footballer
- Hendrik Weerink (1936–2014), Dutch football referee
- Hendrik van der Zee (1929–1991), Dutch boxer
- Hendrick Zuck (born 1990), German footballer

== Writing ==
- Hendrik Adamson (1891–1946), Estonian poet and teacher
- Hendrik van Aken (1250s – 1320s), Brabantian Middle Dutch poet and writer
- Hendrik van Alkmaar (fl.1475–1487), Middle Dutch author of Reynard the Fox
- Hendrik Bulthuis (1865–1945), Dutch Esperanto author and translator
- Hendrik Conscience (1812–1883), Belgian author
- Hendrik Hertzberg (born 1943), American journalist and liberal political commentator
- Hendrik J.A. Hofland (1927–2016), Dutch journalist, commentator, essayist, and columnist
- Hendrik Lindepuu (born 1958), Estonian translator and playwright
- Hendrik Willem van Loon (1882–1944), Dutch-American historian, journalist, and children's book author
- Hendrik Mande (1350s–1431), Dutch mystical writer
- Hendrik Marsman (1899–1940), Dutch poet and writer
- Hendrik Jan Schimmel (1823–1906), Dutch poet and novelist
- Hendrik Laurenszoon Spiegel (1549–1612), Dutch writer and linguist
- Hendrik L.E.M. Terlingen (1941–1994), Dutch radio and television presenter
- Hendrik Tollens (1780–1856), Dutch poet
- Hendrik van Veldeke (c.1145–1184), Limburgish writer, first to write in (Limburgish) Dutch
- Hendrik de Vries (1896–1989), Dutch poet and painter

== Other ==
- Hendrik Geeraert (1863–1925), Belgian skipper and World War I folk hero
- Hendrik Goosen (1904–1990), South African fishing captain, discoverer of the coelacanth
- Hendrick van Hoven (died 1699), Dutch pirate
- Hendrik Hubertsen (1560s – 1627), Dutch shipbuilder working in Sweden
- Hendrik Jut (1851–1878), Dutch murderer
- Hendrik Koot (1898–1941), Dutch collaborator during World War II
- Hendrick Lucifer (1583–1627), Dutch pirate
- Hendrik van Nassau d'Averquerque (1673–1754), Dutch-born British peer and courtier
- Hendrik Spoorbek (?–1845), German-born South African seer, healer and magician
- Hendrik van den Bergh (1914–1997), South African founder of the Bureau of State Security
- Hendrik Verhoeff (c.1645–1710), Dutch silversmith and assassin
- Hendrik Otto Westbroek (born 1952), Dutch radiohost, singer-songwriter, and political activist

== Fiction ==
- Hendrik van der Decken, Mythical Captain of the Flying Dutchman
- Hendrik, a character from the video game Dragon Quest XI

== See also ==
- Toomas Hendrik Ilves, Former President of Estonia

- Hendric
- Hendrick (disambiguation)
- Hendricks (disambiguation)
- Hendrickx
- Hendriks
- Hendrikx
- Hendrix (disambiguation)
- Hendryx
- Henrik
- Henry (disambiguation)
- Henryk (given name)

- Articles that start with Hendrik
