= V-A =

V-A or V−A may refer to:

- "Vector minus axial", a theory of weak interaction
- Vetenskap & Allmänhet
