= Tollens =

Tollens is a Dutch and German surname. Notable people with this surname include:

- Bernhard Tollens (1841–1918), German chemist, discoverer of the Tollens' reagent
- Hendrik Tollens (1780–1856), Dutch poet
- Henricus Jacobus Tollens (1864–1936), Dutch painter and photographer
