= Reekers =

Reekers is a Dutch surname, and may refer to:

- Darron Reekers (born 1973), Dutch cricketer
- Edward Reekers (1957–2025), Dutch singer
- Hendrik Reekers (1815–1854), Dutch painter
- Johan Reekers (born 1957), Dutch Paralympian
- Peter Reekers (born 1981), Dutch footballer
- Rob Reekers (born 1966), Dutch footballer and football manager
