= Hendrikus =

Hendrikus or Hendricus is a Latinized form of the Dutch masculine given name Hendrik ("Henry"). Most people with this name use a short form in daily life, like Han, Hein, Hendrik, Henk, Hennie, Henny, Henri, Henry, Rijk, and Rik. People with the name include:

- Hendrikus Berkhof (1914–1995), Dutch theologian
- Hendrikus Johannes "Henk" Bosveld (1941–1998), Dutch footballer
- Hendricus Petrus "Henk" Bremmer (1871–1956), Dutch painter, art critic, art teacher, collector and art dealer
- Hendrikus Frederikus "Henk" Breuker (1914–2003), Dutch potter and ceramist
- Hendrikus "Henk" Chabot (1894–1949), Dutch painter and sculptor
- Hendrikus "Hendrik" Colijn (1869–1944), Dutch CEO of Royal Dutch Shell and Prime Minister of the Netherlands
- Hendrikus "Hennie" Dompeling (born 1966), Dutch sport shooter
- Hendrikus "Henk" Fraser (born 1966), Dutch football player and manager
- Hendrikus "Hennie" Hollink (1931–2018), Dutch football player and manager
- Hendrikus A.L. "Henk" van Hoof (born 1947), Dutch VVD politician and State Secretary
- Hendrikus Josephus "Henny" Huisman (born 1951), Dutch television presenter
- Hendrikus Alexander "Henk" Janssen (1890–1969), Dutch tug of war competitor
- Hendrikus Zacharias "Hennie" Keetelaar (1927–2002), Dutch water polo player
- Hendrikus Andreas "Hennie" Kuiper (born 1949), Dutch road racing cyclist
- Hendrikus Albertus Lorentz (1871–1944), Dutch explorer in New Guinea and diplomat in South Africa
- Hendricus Malinus (Hendrick van den Broeck; c.1530–1597), Flemish painter active in Italy
- Hendricus Adriaan "Henk" Pellikaan (1910–1999), Dutch footballer
- Hendrikus A. "Henk" Plenter (1913–1997), Dutch footballer
- Hendrikus "Henk" Poort (born 1956), Dutch opera singer and musical performer
- Hendrikus van de Sande Bakhuyzen (1795–1860), Dutch landscape painter and art teacher
- Hendrikus J.E. "Henk" Schiffmacher (born 1952), Dutch tattoo artist
- Hendrikus Wilhelmus Maria "Dick" Schoof (born 1957), Dutch civil servant and politician who served as the prime minister of the Netherlands
- Hendricus J.F.M. "Henk" Sneevliet (1883–1942), Dutch Communist Resistance member executed by the Nazi occupiers
- Hendrikus J.M. "Hennie" Stamsnijder (born 1954), Dutch cyclo-cross and road racing cyclist
- Hendricus T.C. "Henk" Stoof (born 1962), Dutch theoretical physicist
- Hendrikus Jacobus "Hendrik" Tonneboeijer (1814–1837), Dutch Commander of the Dutch Gold Coast
- Hendricus "Henk" Vogels (1942–2019), Australian cyclist
- Hendricus J.P. "Henk" Vos (born 1968), Dutch football player and coach
- Hendrikus "Henk" Vredeling (1924–2007), Minister of Defence and European Commissioner
- Hendricus P.L. van Walterop (1864–1949), Dutch film actor using the pseudonym Henri de Vries
- Hendricus Wessel (1887–1977), Dutch long-distance runner
- Hendrikus Antonius "Henk" Zanoli (1923–2015), Dutch lawyer and World War II Resistance member

== See also ==
- Henricus
