= Henny van der Windt =

Dutch environmental scientist

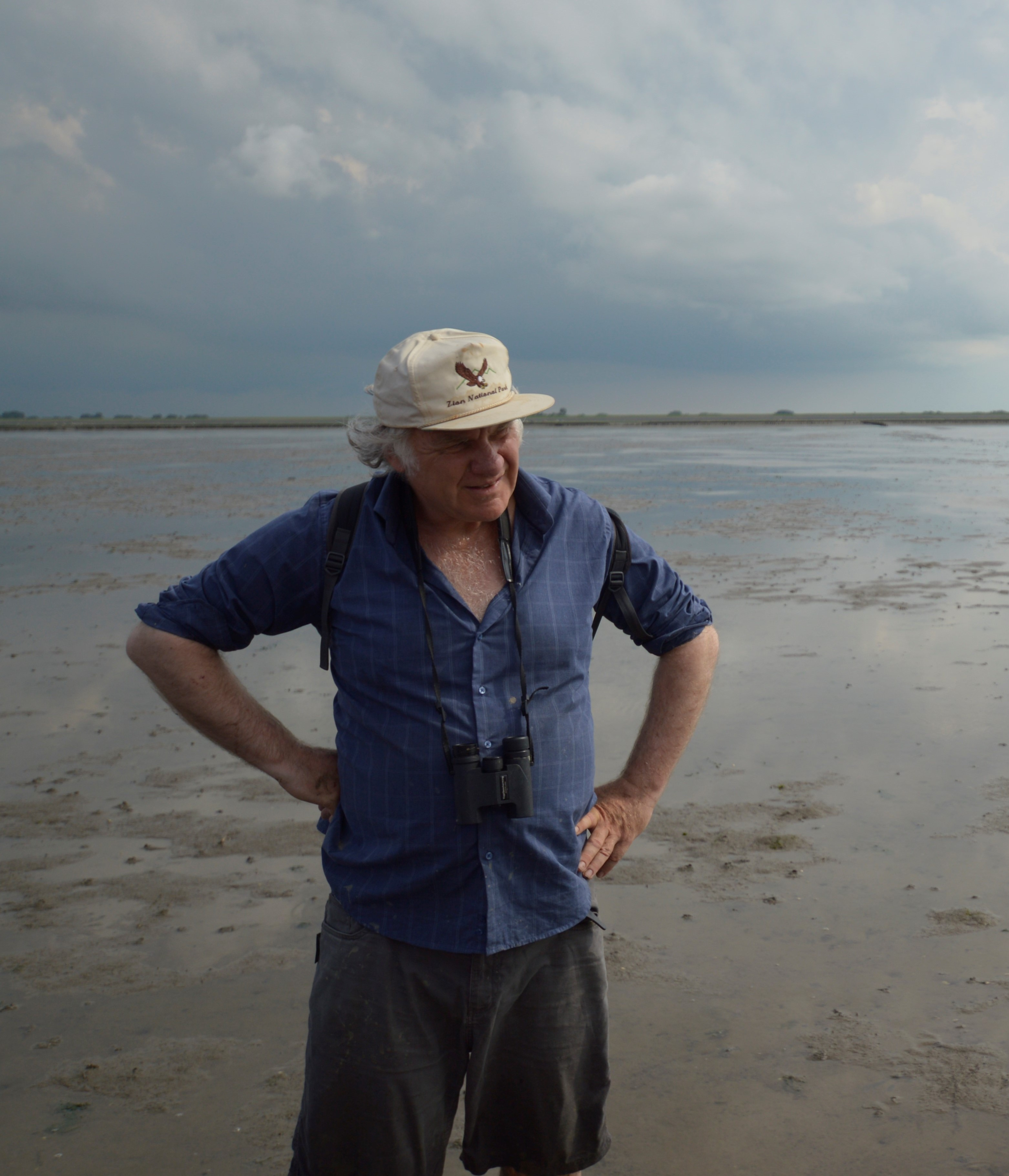
Henny van der Windt in 2021 during an excursion in the Dutch Wadden Sea area

Hendrik Johannes (Henny) van der Windt (born 22 August 1955, in Vlaardingen) is a Dutch associate professor at the Rijksuniversiteit Groningen, specialized in the relationship between sustainability and science, in particular the relationship between nature conservation and ecology and between energy technologies, locale energy-initiatives and the energy transition.

== Youth and study ==
Van der Windt grew up in Vlaardingen where he went to high school ('Hogere Burgerschool-B') and was acive in a scouting group.. He was active in the youth nature study and conservation group Nederlandse Jeugdbond voor Natuurstudie (NJN), the regional environmental group Centraal Aksiekomitee Rijnmond and various student committees on environmental protection. After high school he studied biology at the Rijksuniversiteit Groningen (1972-1981).

== PhD and academic position ==
He received his doctorate in 1995 with his PhD dissertation "En dan: wat is natuur nog in dit land?: natuurbescherming in Nederland 1880-1990" (After all, what is nature in this country, nature conservation in the Netherlands 1980–1990), with chapters on the rise of nature conservation, tensions between agriculture and nature conservation, forestry, ecological restoration and the management of the Wadden Sea.

At that time he worked as a junior scientist and lecturer at the Biology Department of the University of Groningen. After his doctorate, he worked several years as a researcher (post-doc) in Groningen within the Ethics and Policy research programme of NWO Around 2000 he became associate professor at the Science & Society Group (later Integrated Research on Energy, Environment and Society (IREES)) of the University of Groningen.

== Research, education, outreach and management ==
He studied science-society interactions concerning genomics, food, ecological restoration, energy and sustainability, combining approaches and insights from biology, environmental science, environmental history and science and technology studies.

His education tasks include various courses such as second year Bachelor programmes Science & Society, the minor Future Planet Innovation and courses of the mastertrack Science, Business & Policy and the master Energy and Environmental sciences. He was involved in the founding and management of the science shop. Other functions he fulfilled were member of the editorial board of the university journal Universiteitskrant, interim head of the unit Science & Society Group, board member of ESRIG and chairperson of the board of examinars of EES.

== Publications ==
In addition to scientific papers, journalistic articles and policy reports Van der Windt was author or editor of several books or chapters. A selection:

- 1995. En dan: wat is natuur nog in dit land? Natuurbescherming in Nederland 1880-1990. Boom.
- 2001. Een Spiegel der Wetenschap, 200 Jaar Koninklijk Natuurkundig Genootschap te Groningen. With Adriaan Blaauw, Bert Boekschoten, Ulco Kooystra, Dick Leijenaar, Franck Smit, Kees Wiese & Marten van Wijhe. Profiel.
- 2005. Harmony or diversity? In: Nature and Art, The Hoge Veluwe. Waanders.
- 2008. Tussen dierenliefde en milieubeleid. Academia Press.
- 2009. About Snowy Plovers, Lapwings and Wolves; How to Include Contrasting Visions of Ecologists and Laymen in Decision-Making. In: New Visions of Nature; Complexity and Authenticity, Springer.
- 2012. Knocking on Doors: Boundary Objects in Ecological Conservation and Restoration. With Sjaak Swart. In: Sustainability Science, The Emerging Paradigm and the Urban Environment, Springer.
- 2012. Parks without Wilderness, Wilderness without Parks? In: Civilizing Nature, National Parks in Global Historical Perspective. Berghahn.
- 2019. Community Energy Storage: Governance and Business Models. With Binod Koirala, Rudi Hakvoort & Ellen van Oost. In: Consumer, Prosumer, Prosumager, Elsevier.
- 2021. New Pathways for Community Energy and Storage. With Ellen van Oost, Binod Koirala |& Esther van der Waal. MDPI.
- 2026. Insights into three alternative agriculture practices to foster food system transformation for life on land. With Jorien Zevenberg. In: The Elgar Companion to Food System Transformation for Sustainable Development, Elgar.
