= Jan Claesz Rietschoof =

Dutch Golden Age painter

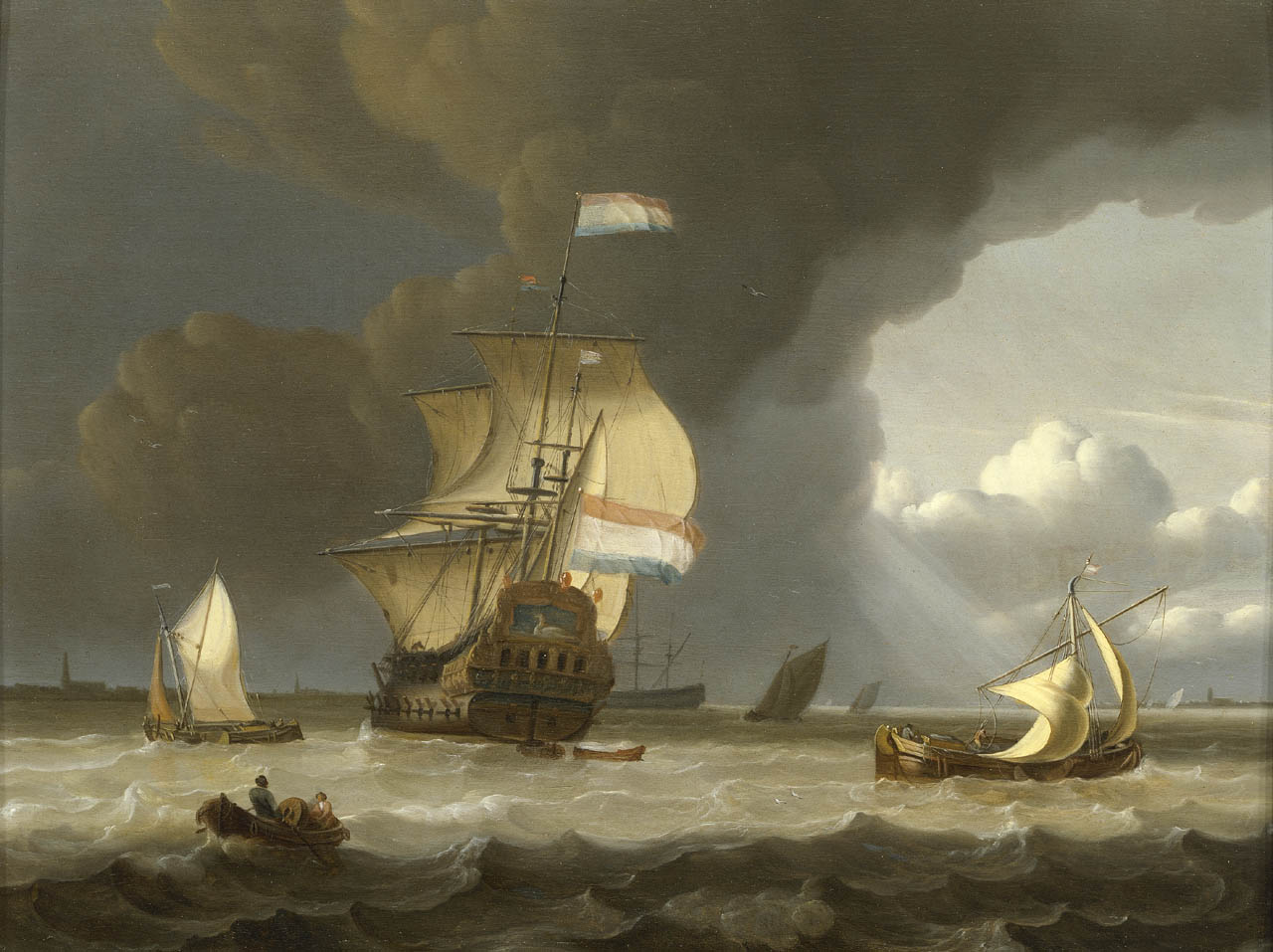
- Ships at the mouth of the Scheldt
- Born: Jan Claesz; 21 May 1652; Hoorn
- Died: 3 November 1719 (aged 67); Hoorn
- Known for: Painting
- Movement: Baroque seascapes

Jan Claesz Rietschoof (1652–1719) was a Dutch Golden Age painter of seascapes.

== Biography ==
According to Houbraken he learned painting first from Abraham Liedts, and later from the renowned seascape painter Ludolf Bakhuizen.

== Paintings ==
His paintings today hang in various museums in the Netherlands. He taught his son Hendrik Rietschoof (1678–1747) how to paint; Hendrik's seascape and seaport drawings are online at the Amsterdam archives. In Hoorn he was a contemporary of the flower painter Jacob Rootius, who was the son of the influential schutterstuk painter Jan Albertsz Rotius.
