= VA (Public & Science) =

Swedish non-profit association

- Founded: January 2002
- Type: Not-for-profit organisation funded by membership fees and a grant from the Swedish Ministry of Education and Research.
- Purpose: Citizen Science, Innovation, Science Communication
- Location: Stockholm, Sweden
- Website: v-a.se

VA (Public & Science) (Swedish: "Vetenskap & Allmänhet") is a Sweden-based non-profit association focusing on citizen science, responsible research and innovation, and science communication to the Swedish and European public. Its projects include: web games, books, and festivals for public engagement; studies and surveys to measure public scientific knowledge and engagement; and national and international research policy advocacy.

== Projects ==
VA is currently a partner in three EU-funded Horizon 2020 projects SciShops: ORION, Open Responsible research and Innovation to further Outstanding Knowledge, is aimed at fostering RRI and open science in research performing and research funding organisations. SciShops will expand the ecosystem of Science Shops in Europe and BLOOM is aimed at raising public awareness and interest in the bioeconomy through dialogue and co-creation activities.

== Membership ==
VA's members consist of some 100 organizations, authorities, universities, companies and associations. In addition, it has a number of individual members. The organization is funded through membership fees, project grants and a grant from the Swedish Ministry of Education and Research.

VA is a member of EUSEA (European Science Events Association), ECSA (European Citizen Science Association) and the Living Knowledge network.

== Board of Representatives ==
VA's board consists of representatives from the association's members; each representative serves a term of two years. The following are the representatives as of 2021.

- Board President - Ann Fust
- Young Researchers Representative - Anna Hedlund
- Foundation for Strategic Research Representative - Lars Hultman
- IKEM Innovations and the chemical industry Representative - Magnus Huss
- KTH - Kungl. Institute of Technology Representative - Sigbritt Karlsson
- Engineers of Sweden Representative - Ulrika Lindstrand
- Chairman of the RIFO Society members of parliament and researchers - Betty Malmberg
- The Swedish Museum of Natural History - Lisa Månsson
- Student Unions Representative - David Samuelsson
- The Swedish Research Council - Sven Stafström
- IVA - Kungl. Academy of Engineering Sciences - Tuula Teeri
- Consultant - Urban Wass
- Freelance Journalist - Jack Werner
