= Hendrik Jut =

Dutch murderer (1851–1878)

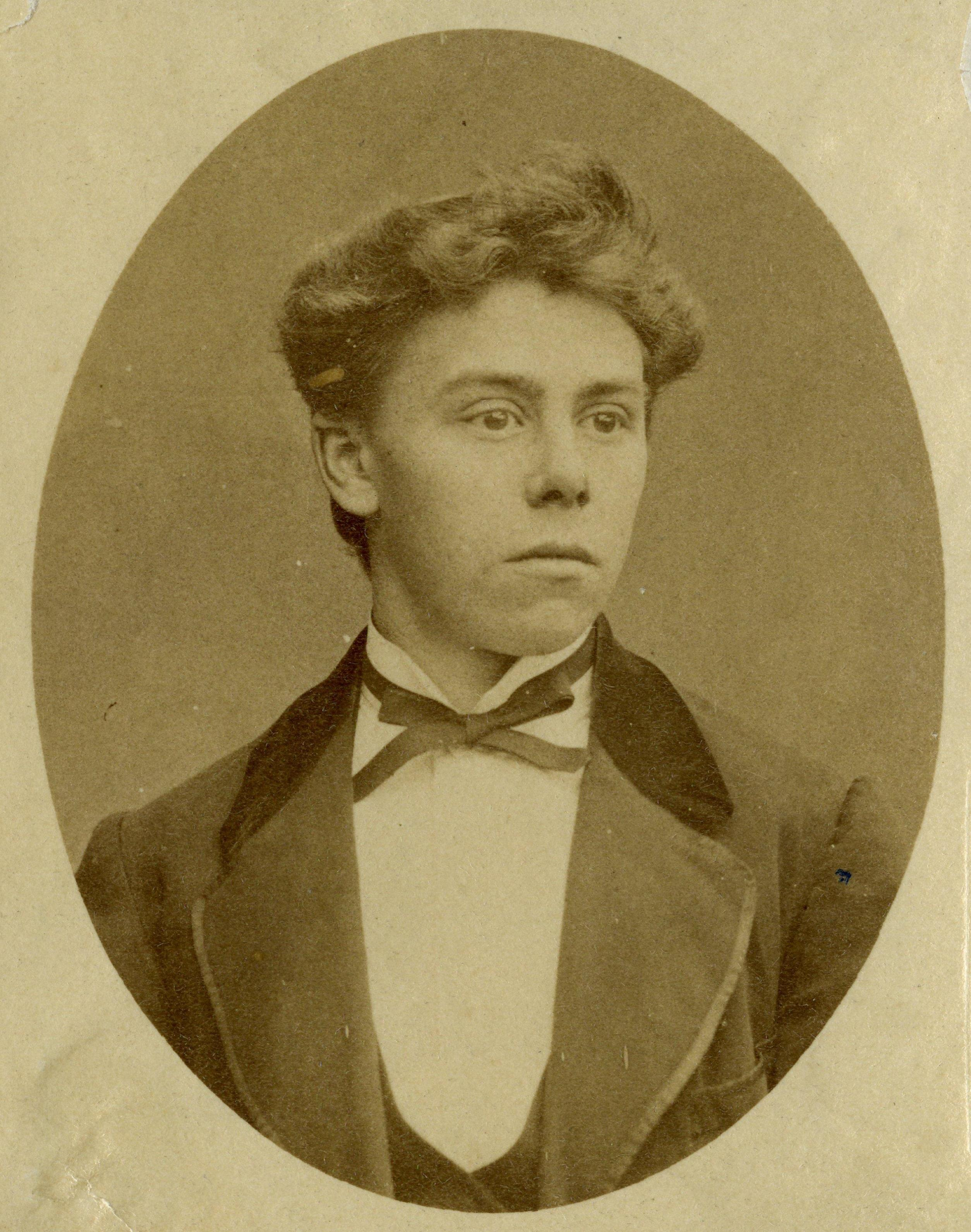
Hendrik Jut in 1878

Hendrik Jut (19 July 1851 – 12 June 1878) was a Dutch 19th-century murderer from The Hague.

He killed two people in part to afford his marriage to Christina Goedvolk. After the murders the couple traveled, or fled, but eventually returned to the Netherlands where they were imprisoned. Jut died relatively soon after imprisonment while Christina lived out her twelve-year sentence. Once released she changed her surname to "De Graaf", her mother's, and became a maid. She remarried, but had difficulties continuing to her death in 1926.

He has become a part of Dutch folk culture and a carnival "strength tester" called the "Kop van Jut" (Head of Jut, hitting a block with a large mallet, causing a bell to be rung if the blow is powerful enough) is said to be named after him. In English it is called the high striker. In the Dutch language, the expression "de kop van jut zijn" (being the head of jut) means 'being the scapegoat'.

Hendrik Jut's head was kept in a jar and was long on display in an anatomical museum attached to Groningen University but apparently was discarded after the bottle started leaking. There is however a cast of his head still extant.
