= Hendrik Menso =

Dutch politician

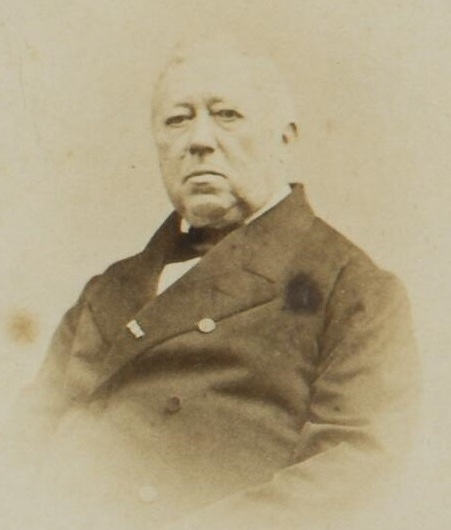
H. Menso

Hendrik Menso (22 February 1791, Rhenen - 3 March 1872, Rhenen) was a Dutch politician and doctor, and mayor of Rhenen 1843–1872.
