= Hendrik van Eikema Hommes =

Dutch legal scholar

Hendrik Jan van Eikema Hommes (May 3, 1930, IJlst – September 3, 1984, Bussum) was a noted Dutch legal scholar and successor to Herman Dooyeweerd in the post of philosopher and judicial scholar at Vrije Universiteit, Amsterdam, Netherlands.

Van Eikema Hommes wrote an Introduction to the Philosophy of Dooyeweerd, along with numerous legal studies. He was elected a member of the Royal Netherlands Academy of Arts and Sciences in 1983.

== Academic works ==
- Major trends in the history of legal philosophy. Amsterdam: North Holland, 1979.
- "Freedom and equality in constitutional and civil law." In: Equality and Freedom: International and Comparative Jurisprudence. Papers of the World Congress on Philosophy of Law and Social Philosophy. St Louis, 1975. Vol. III, 1977, pp. 1085–1094.
- "Some remarks on the relation between law and logic". Logical Analysis. 14: 165–169. 1971.
- "Review: Wijsbegeerte en Vakwetenskap by D. F. M. Strauss". Philosophia Reformata. 37 (3/4): 194–196. 1972. doi:10.1163/22116117-90001243.
- Van Eikema Hommes, H. J. (1974). "The Functions of Law and the Role of Legal Principles". Philosophia Reformata. 39 (1/2): 77–81. doi:10.1163/22116117-90001265.
- Van Eikema Hommes, H. J. (1976). "The Limits of the Legal Competence of the State". Philosophia Reformata. 41 (1/2): 9–23. doi:10.1163/22116117-90001278.
- Van Eikema Hommes, H.J. (1978). "The Material Idea of the Law-State". Philosophia Reformata. 43 (1/2): 49–60. doi:10.1163/22116117-90001308.
- Van Eikema Hommes, Hendrik (1982). "Moderne Rechtsstaat en Grondrechten". Philosophia Reformata. 47 (2): 97–120. doi:10.1163/22116117-90001385.
- "Legal Order and Legal Principles," in Symposia I (Memoria del X Congreso mundial ordinario de filosofía del derecho y filosofía social 5; Universidad nacional autónoma de México, 1981), pp. 43–56.
