= Hendrik Rietschoof =

Dutch painter

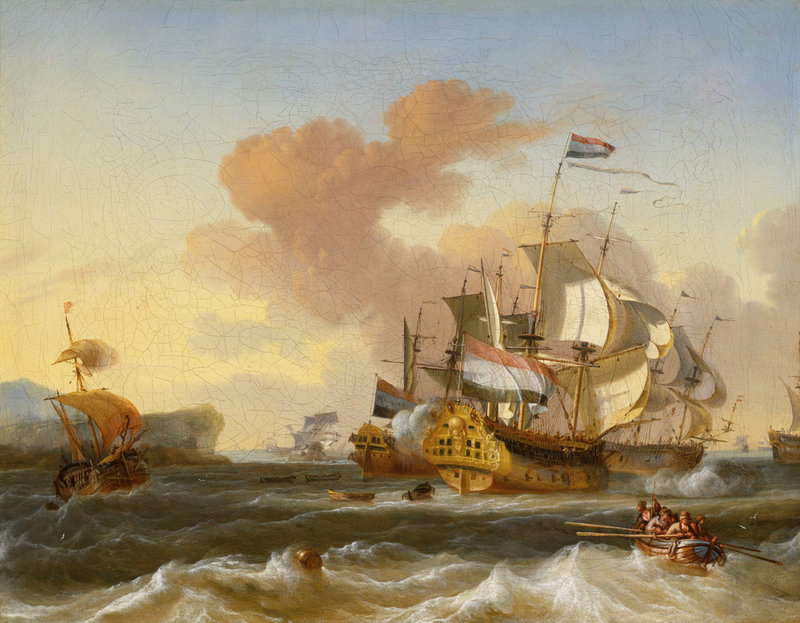
A Dutch Flagship and other Vessels off a Rocky Coast

Hendrik Rietschoof (bapt. 2 August 1678, Hoorn – 1746, Koog aan de Zaan), was a Dutch Golden Age painter.

== Biography ==
According to Houbraken he was the son of Jan Claesz Rietschoof who became just as good as he had been in marine painting.

According to the RKD his father was Jan Claesz. Rietschoof and was known for marines. His earliest dated work was made when he was 15 years old.
