= Hendrik Veen =

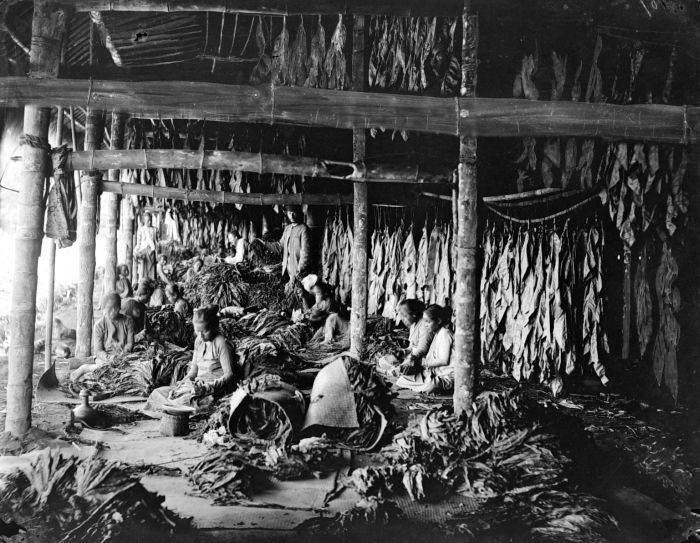
Tobacco production in Kali Panjing, East Java

Hendrik Veen (6 October 1823, Haarlem – 14 March 1905, Haarlem) was a prolific photographer in the Dutch East Indies. He photographed ethnographic shots of locals, landscapes, architecture, landscapes and botanical subjects. His work included a series of photos of the temples in Buleleng.
