= Hendrik Verhoeff =

Dutch silversmith and schutter (c. 1645–1710)

Hendrik Verhoeff (around 1645 – 27 June 1710, in Utrecht) was a silversmith and schutter from The Hague who played a role in the assassinations of Cornelis de Witt and Johan de Witt on 20 August 1672.
