= Hendrick van Someren =

Dutch painter

Hendrick van Someren, or Somer (1615 in Amsterdam – 1685 in Amsterdam), was a Dutch painter active in Amsterdam. His oeuvre is not well established. Earlier art historians mixed up the artist with a Flemish artist with a similar name, Hendrick de Somer who worked in Naples in Italy where he was an important Caravaggist painter.

== Biography ==
Hendrick van Someren was born in Amsterdam where he was baptized on 23 July 1615. He came from a family of artists. His father was the Flemish painter Barend van Someren from Antwerp who had established himself in Amsterdam after a stay in Italy. His mother was Leonora (Dionora) Mijtens, the daughter of the Flemish painter Aert Mijtens, a painter who spent most of his career in Italy. Hendrick van Someren studied under his father.

Until quite recently Hendrick van Someren was confused with a contemporary Flemish painter from Lokeren or Lochristi with an almost identical name called Hendrick de Somer and known in Italy as 'Enrico Fiammingo'. The credit for discovering the true identity of Hendrick de Somer and unravelling the confusion with Hendrick van Someren is due to Ulisse Prota-Giurleo who discovered a record of an 'Enrico de Somer' acting as a witness in a legal procedure relating to the marriage of the painter Viviano Codazzi in Naples. In the document the painter stated that at the time he was 29 years old, had lived in Naples for 12 years and the name of his father was "Gil".

It is now clear that Hendrick van Someren was not born in Naples nor did he work there. Rather, he worked his whole life in Amsterdam.

== Work ==
The Dutch biographer of the turn of the 18th century Arnold Houbraken claimed Hendrick van Someren was a good painter of historical allegories, landscapes, and flower still lifes.

No works survive in the styles Houbraken mentioned. The current whereabouts of a hunting still life in an inventory of 1693 is unknown. The Dutch art historian Godefridus Johannes Hoogewerff made a good, but not entirely convincing attribution of a vanitas still life in a private collection to van Someren.

All Caravaggist works formerly attributed to Hendrick van Someren have now been re-attributed to the Flemish artist Hendrick de Somer.
