= Hendrik Wyermars =

Dutch philosopher (1685–1757)

Hendrik Wyermars (early June 1685 – 27 September 1757) was a Dutch radical Enlightenment thinker from Amsterdam who in 1710 published a philosophical book defending the eternity of the world and rejecting the literal version of the Creation story from the Book of Genesis. For contradicting fundamental Christian doctrine the book was condemned by the local church authorities and Wyermars was subsequently jailed for 15 years in the Amsterdam Rasphuis. He was considered an adherent of Spinozism, proclaiming atheist and materialist views.

== Life and trial ==
Hendrik Wyermars was baptized in Amsterdam on 9 June 1685. His father was Willem Wyermars, who from 1684 until his death in 1691 worked as a peat transporter. He married in 1684.

Hendrik received no higher education. He knew no Latin and only read books in Dutch. At the time of his arrest in 1710 he was a clerk at a merchant's office. Still, he was widely read, particularly in the radical philosophical literature of the time. Though largely self-taught, he had free-thinking friends who inspired him. The most important of these was Antony van Dalen (1644–1715), a theologian who earned a living as a painter and teacher and who had adopted a Spinozistic worldview. Van Dalen thus acted as a philosophical mentor to Wyermars.

In 1710, Wyermars laid down his views in a book called Den ingebeelde chaos (The Imaginary Chaos), in which he developed a naturalistic philosophy. It was occasioned by his criticism of a book by a fellow freethinker from Utrecht, Dirk Santvoort (1653–1712), who had suggested that the world in its present form is not eternal (although he believed matter and motion were). Wyermars sent him a letter explaining his objections to this, but Santvoort failed to reply. As he states in the preface to his book, Wyermars then decided to publish the contents of the letter as part of his own book, in which he also criticizes the Lucretian account of the origin of the present world from a pre-existing chaos.

The Amsterdam consistory of the Reformed Church immediately reacted to Wyermars's book by informing the town magistrates about its publication. Most of the around 450 printed copies had already been sold at that point. A few months later Wyermars was arrested and after a summary interrogation sentenced to a fine of 3,000 guilders, fifteen years’ solitary confinement ‘without pen, ink, or paper’ and subsequent banishment from Amsterdam and the Province of Holland for twenty-five years. This verdict was according to the 1678 Dutch law prohibiting the printing and distribution of Spinozistic works.

Wyermars survived the jail sentence, and after being released in 1725 settled in Amsterdam despite his banishment. His living conditions were poor and he depended wholly on the help of some friends. In 1744 and again in 1748 he was arrested for infringing his banishment and ordered to leave the town and the province. He failed to do so, however, and after being arrested for a third time, in 1749, he was again sentenced to do time (ten years) in the Rasphuis as well as being banned from Holland for life. He died a broken man on 27 September 1757, after having been taken to an Amsterdam hospital.

== The Imaginary Chaos ==
The stated purpose of Wyermars's book is to uphold the eternity of the world and of movement. Rejecting the cosmological and other proofs of God's existence, he denies that God can be regarded as the cause of movement. Movement can only be explained mechanistically from the nature of extension. The attribute of extension together with that of thought constitutes the world or universe, and its exists co-eternally with God. Wyermars reinterprets the dogma of creation ex nihilo as the absolute dependence of the world on God's power. Creation is therefore not a fact of history, and the biblical account of the six-day creation should accordingly be regarded as a metaphorical tale adapted to ancient Jewish conceptions.

As a Spinozist Wyermars rejected a personal and transcendent God, miracles and the supernatural and held that everything in nature can be explained according to natural laws. Wyermars shares many of Spinoza's views on Scripture and theology, but deviates from him in trying to give a rational account of the Trinity (Father, Son, Holy Spirit). God, extension and thought constitute the Trinity in a philosophical sense, with extension and thought being eternally generated by God's absolute power. This is an immanent act of God, whereas creation is a transcendent act. But Wyermars denies that God creates something ‘outside’ himself, for he agrees with Spinoza that a substance cannot produce another substance. By introducing into this monistic framework the notion of God generating his own attributes (instead of, as Spinoza said, consisting of them) and 'creating' the world, Wyermars tried to improve upon Spinoza and at the same time to accommodate his views to a more religious readership, while in fact propagating antireligious ideas.

== Reputation and research ==
A lengthy review of Wyermars's book by the German scholar Christoph August Heumann in the Acta philosophorum for 1716 gave Wyermars an international reputation as a Spinozist. The first modern scholarly article on Wyermars was written in 1974 by the Flemish researcher Hubert Vandenbossche (1945–2016). Jonathan Israel included Wyermars in his study on the Radical Enlightenment (2001), describing him as an “incisive, challenging thinker” who embodied “a new kind of vernacular, non-academic, philosophical materialism” that was disseminated through coffee houses, discussion groups and easily accessible writings. In 2015, Wyermars's book was republished in an annotated and modernized Dutch version with an introduction summarizing the current state of scholarship on Wyermars.
