= Henrie =

Henrie is both a surname and a given name. Notable people with the name include:

Surname:

- David Henrie (born 1989), American actor, television writer, and producer
- Don Henrie, American television personality
- Gervais Henrie, Seychellois politician
- Mark C. Henrie, American writer and journal editor
- Paul Blaine Henrie (1932–1999), American painter and illustrator

Given name:

- Henrie Mutuku (born 1978), Kenyan singer

== See also ==
- Henry (disambiguation)
