= Hendrick Couturier =

Dutch-American painter

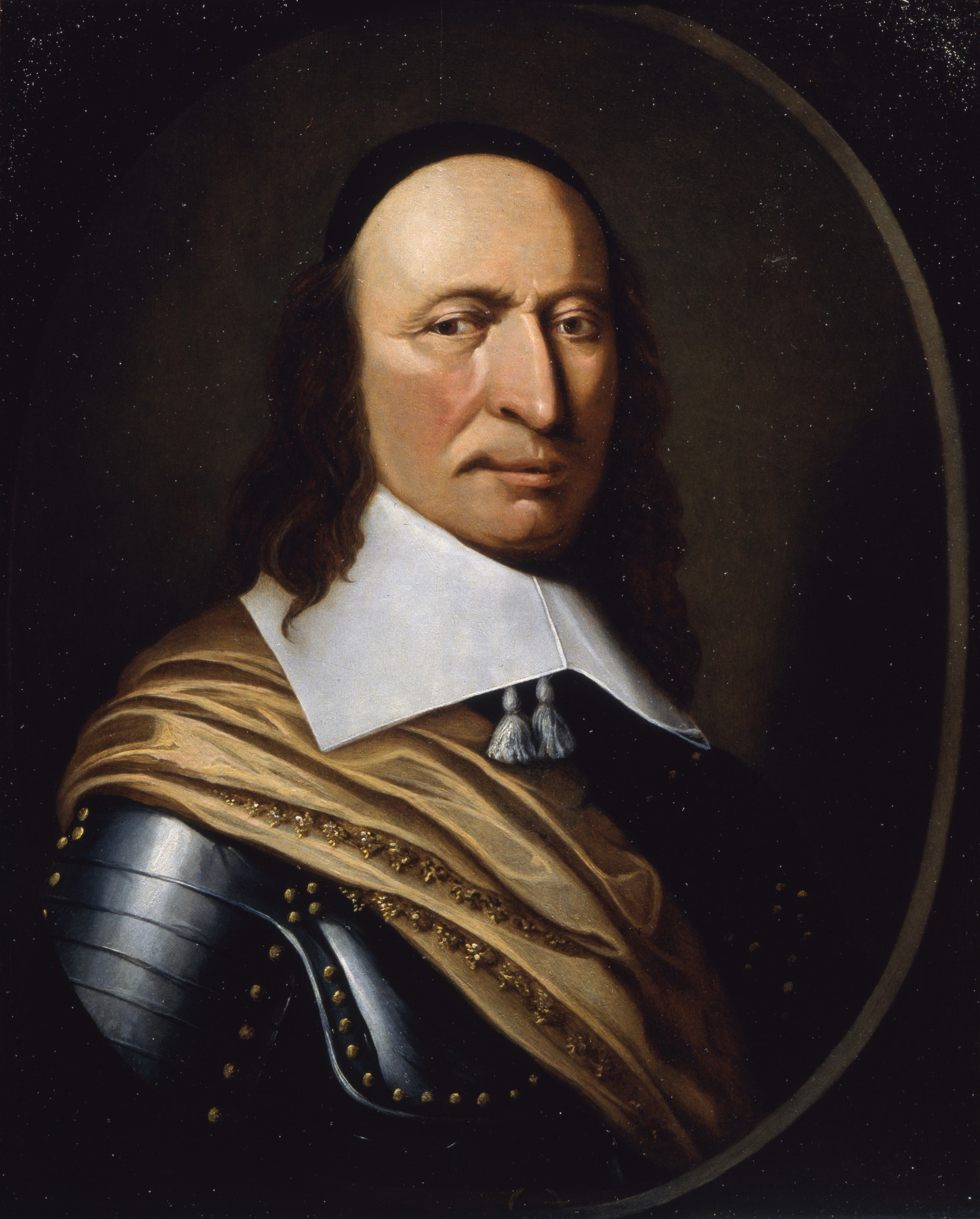
Peter Stuyvesant portrait in the New York Historical Society

Hendrick Couturier (1620, Leiden – 1684, New York City), was a Dutch Golden Age painter.

== Biography ==
According to the RKD he married in Leiden in 1648 and moved to America. He lived both in New Amsterdam/New York and New Amstel/New Castle. He is primarily known today as the (possible) portrait painter of Pieter Stuyvesant, though this attribution is based mainly on a court statement of his wife in 1663 that Stuyvesant had given her and her husband the "Burgerright" in exchange for the portrait he had painted of the Director General.

There is archival evidence of Couturier's life which indicated guild membership in Leiden before emigrating and producing some works painted in New Amsterdam.

In 1925 an exhibition of portraits of early Americans was held in New York by the Century Association. At this exhibition an oil portrait was shown of Oloff Stevense Van Cortlandt (father of the 17th century mayor of New York Stephanus Van Cortlandt) that at that time was attributed to Couturier. This prompted the New York art collector Thomas B. Clarke to purchase it, who later showed it in 1928 as part of his collection. According to its current provenance record in the National Gallery of Art, the attribution to Couturier has since been changed to "Unknown man by unknown 17th century French painter".
