= Hendrik Van Brussel =

Belgian roboticist

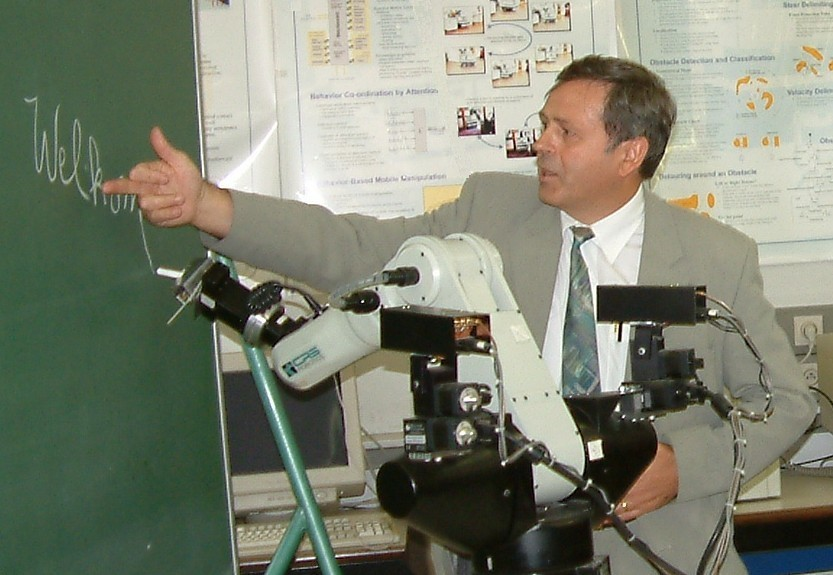
- Born: 24 October 1944 (age 81); Ypres, Belgium
- Education: KU Leuven
- Known for: Mechatronics; Robotics; Manufacturing
- Scientific career
- Fields: Robotics

Hendrik "Rik" Van Brussel (24 October 1944) is a Belgian emeritus professor of mechanical engineering of the KU Leuven, world-renowned for his research on robotics, mechatronics and holonic manufacturing systems.

== Biography ==
Van Brussel was born in Ypres, Belgium. He received the degrees of technical engineer in mechanical engineering (BSc), in 1965 from HTI, Ostend, Belgium; of 'engineer' in electronic engineering (MSc) in 1968 from KU Leuven, Belgium, and of Doctor of Applied Sciences (PhD) in 1971, also from KU Leuven, thesis: "Dynamical analysis of the cutting process". In his whole career, spanning a period of more than 40 years, he has been active in the intersection zone between several disciplines: mechanical engineering, electronics and control engineering, information technology; a domain which is now called "mechatronics".

He started his career as Expert at the Metal Industries Development Centre (MIDC), Bandung, Indonesia, where he also occupied the post of associate professor at Institut Teknologi Bandung, Bandung, Indonesia (1971—1973). Thereafter he returned to the K.U.Leuven to pursue an academic career, becoming full professor in 1980. He was Head of Division PMA (Production Engineering, Machine design and Automation) of KU Leuven, (1980–93 and 2001–03) and subsequently chairman thereof (2003–2010). He was Chairman of the Department of Mechanical Engineering (1993–2001). He was Project leader of Interuniversity Attraction Pole Projects on Advanced Mechatronic Systems (Centre of Excellence), from 1987 until 2006.

== Work ==
Apart from his extensive work in Cutting dynamics, Structural dynamics, Computer-Integrated Manufacture (CIM), and Micro and Precision Engineering, the rest of Van Brussel's work may be organized under the following three main topics:

Robotics: Pioneering work in robotics research in Belgium, and in Europe; work includes: active force feedback; methodology for model-based task-specification and control of "compliant motion" tasks; universal three-finger gripper; LOLA, an off-line robot programming language with structured data base; KARMEN, a general analysis and design program for the inverse and direct kinematics and dynamics of 3D mechanisms; multi-component force-torque sensors and a tactile sensor array; robotic force-controlled deburring; Service robotics: LiAS, an autonomous mobile manipulator; intelligent wheelchairs with shared autonomy; medical robotics, e.g. robotised laparoscopy involving innovative haptic interfaces.

Mechatronics: Development of a mechatronic design philosophy, aiming at the 'mechatronic compiler' where the mechanical structure and the motion controller are simultaneously optimised, for designing high-performance machines and machine systems. This includes: optimisation of the mechanical structure in the conceptual design phase; derivation of robust control algorithms (H-infinity, sliding mode, ..) that can guarantee performance in the presence of important disturbances, such as changing machine configuration, cutting forces, friction, ...; derivation of simple control models from finite-element models of the mechanical structure as a basis for developing control algorithms; development of an integrated design framework for simultaneous optimisation of structure and controller of complex flexible-multi-body mechatronic systems with time-varying configurations.

Holonic Manufacturing Systems (Multi-agent systems): In the framework of the factory-of-the-future idea and along the lines of the Intelligent Manufacturing System (IMS) programme, launched in 1990 by Prof. H. Yoshikawa, Japan. Main achievement is setting up reference architectures and a design methodology for holonic manufacturing systems. The developed PROSA architecture is generally accepted by the international research community as a reference architecture. Application of biologically inspired control paradigms, like pheromones in ant colonies, to control complex manufacturing systems, which leads to a multi-agent control framework.

== Awards ==
Amongst the many awards and honours Prof. Van Brussel has received, here is a list of the more prominent ones:

- 1976: Taylor Medal of CIRP (International Academy for Production Engineering).
- 1984: KVIV-TI Research Prize for research in robotics. (KVIV-TI: Technological Institute of the Royal Flemish Engineering Society).
- 1987: ASEA Golden Robot Award.
- 1989: Society of Manufacturing Engineers (SME) Fellow.
- 1990—: Member of The Royal Academies for Science and the Arts of Belgium, becoming Director of the Class of Natural Sciences.
- 1994: Doctor honoris causa at Politehnica University of Bucharest.
- 1994: IEEE Fellow.
- 1994: Doctor honoris causa at Rheinisch-Westfälische Technische Hochschule RWTH Aachen University.
- 1998: Recipient of the SME/CASA LEAD Award, for excellence in teaching and research in integrated manufacturing.
- 2002: Foreign Member of the Royal Swedish Academy of Engineering Sciences (IVA).
- 2002: Recipient of the SME F.W. Taylor Research Medal.
- 2003: Doctor honoris causa at Transylvania University of Braşov.
- 2008: Recipient of the Joseph Engelberger Award of IFR For contributing to the advancement of the Science of Robotics in the Service of Mankind.
- 2009: Foreign Associate of the National Academy of Engineering (United States) for pioneering research in mechatronics and robotics applied to manufacturing and medical surgery, and for designing holonic manufacturing systems.
- 2010: Recipient of the prestigious Georg-Schlesinger-Preis 2009 from the State Secretary for Science and Research of the State of Berlin, with the citation: für hervorragende wissenschaftliche Leistungen auf dem Gebiet der Werkzeugmaschinen und Fertigungstechnik.
- 2010: Fellow School of Engineering, The University of Tokyo.
- 2013: Honorary Member, Hungarian Academy of Sciences (MTA).
- 2017: Honorary Professor, Nanjing University of Aeronautics and Astronautics (NUAA).
- 2018: Lifetime Achievement Award, European Society for Precision Engineering and Nanotechnology (euspen).

== Positions and Affiliations ==
- Member of the Royal Flemish Academy of Belgium for Science and the Arts, Class of Natural Sciences.
- Member of the International Institution for Production Engineering Research (CIRP). President of CIRP, 2000–2001, Past Chairman of Scientific Technical Committee on Assembly (STC-A).
- Fellow of IEEE (Institute of Electrical and Electronics Engineers).
- Fellow of SME (Society of Manufacturing Engineers).
- Member of KVIV (Royal Flemish Engineering Society).
- Past Member of BIRA (Belgian Institute of Automatic Control and Automation). Past member of the Board. Past chairman of Working group on System Theory. Past chairman of Working group on Robotics.
- Member of BSMEE (Belgian Society of Mechanical and Environmental Engineers).
- Honorary Member of the National Committee of Theoretical and Applied Mechanics.
- Past member and chairman of the Scientific Committee for Mechanical and Electrical Engineering of the FWO (Fund for Scientific Research, Flanders).
- Past Member of the Scientific Committee for Mechanical and Electrical Engineering of the FNRS (Fonds National de la Recherche Scientifique).
- Associate editor, Member of the Editorial Board and/or Reviewer for IFToMM Journal MMT, "IEEE Transactions on Robotics and Automation", "International Journal of Robotics Research", "International Journal of Advanced Manufacturing Technology", "Mechatronics", "Mechatronic Systems Engineering", "Robotics and Computer-integrated Manufacturing", "Robotics and Autonomous Systems".
- Past-President of euspen (European Society for Precision Engineering and Nanotechnology), 2007-09.

== Selected bibliography ==
A full list of publications of Hendrik Van Brussel, including the over 80 (co)supervised PhD theses, is to be found on K.U.Leuven's publication repository. Here are a few selected papers:

- Van Brussel H, Wyns J, Valckenaers P, et al., Reference architecture for holonic manufacturing systems: PROSA, COMPUTERS IN INDUSTRY, 37(3), pp. 255–274, 1998.
- Reynaerts D, Van Brussel H, Design aspects of shape memory actuators, MECHATRONICS, 8(6), pp. 635–656, 1998.
- De Fonseca P, Sas P, Van Brussel H, A comparative study of methods for optimising sensor and actuator locations in active control applications, JOURNAL OF SOUND AND VIBRATION, 221(4), pp. 651–679, 1999.
- Reynaerts D, Peirs J, Van Brussel H, Shape memory micro-actuation for a gastro-intestinal intervention system, SENSORS AND ACTUATORS A-PHYSICAL, 77(2), pp. 157–166, 1999.
- Van Brussel H, Sas P, Nemeth I, et al., Towards a mechatronic compiler, IEEE-ASME TRANSACTIONS ON MECHATRONICS, 6(1), pp. 90–105, 2001.
- Pritschow G, Altintas Y, Jovane F, Koren Y, Mitsuishi M, Takata S, Van Brussel H, Weck M, Yamazaki Y, Open controller architecture - Past, present and future, CIRP ANNALS-MANUFACTURING TECHNOLOGY, 50(2), pp. 463–470, 2001.
- Trendafilova I, Van Brussel H, Non-linear dynamics tools for the motion analysis and condition monitoring of robot joints, MECHANICAL SYSTEMS AND SIGNAL PROCESSING, 15(6), pp. 1141–1164, 2001.
- Valckenaers P, Van Brussel H, Kollingbaum M, et al., Multi-agent coordination and control using stigmergy applied to manufacturing control, MULTI-AGENT SYSTEMS AND APPLICATIONS, Book Series: LECTURE NOTES IN ARTIFICIAL INTELLIGENCE, Vol. 2086, pp. 317–334, 2001.
- Al-Bender F, Symens W, Swevers J, Van Brussel H, Theoretical analysis of the dynamic behavior of hysteresis elements in mechanical systems, INTERNATIONAL JOURNAL OF NON-LINEAR MECHANICS, 39(10), pp. 1721–1735, 2004.
- Valckenaers P, Van Brussel H, Design for the unexpected: From holonic manufacturing systems towards a humane mechatronics society, Butterworth-Heinemann, 2015.
