= Hendrik Figee =

Dutch businessman (1838–1907)

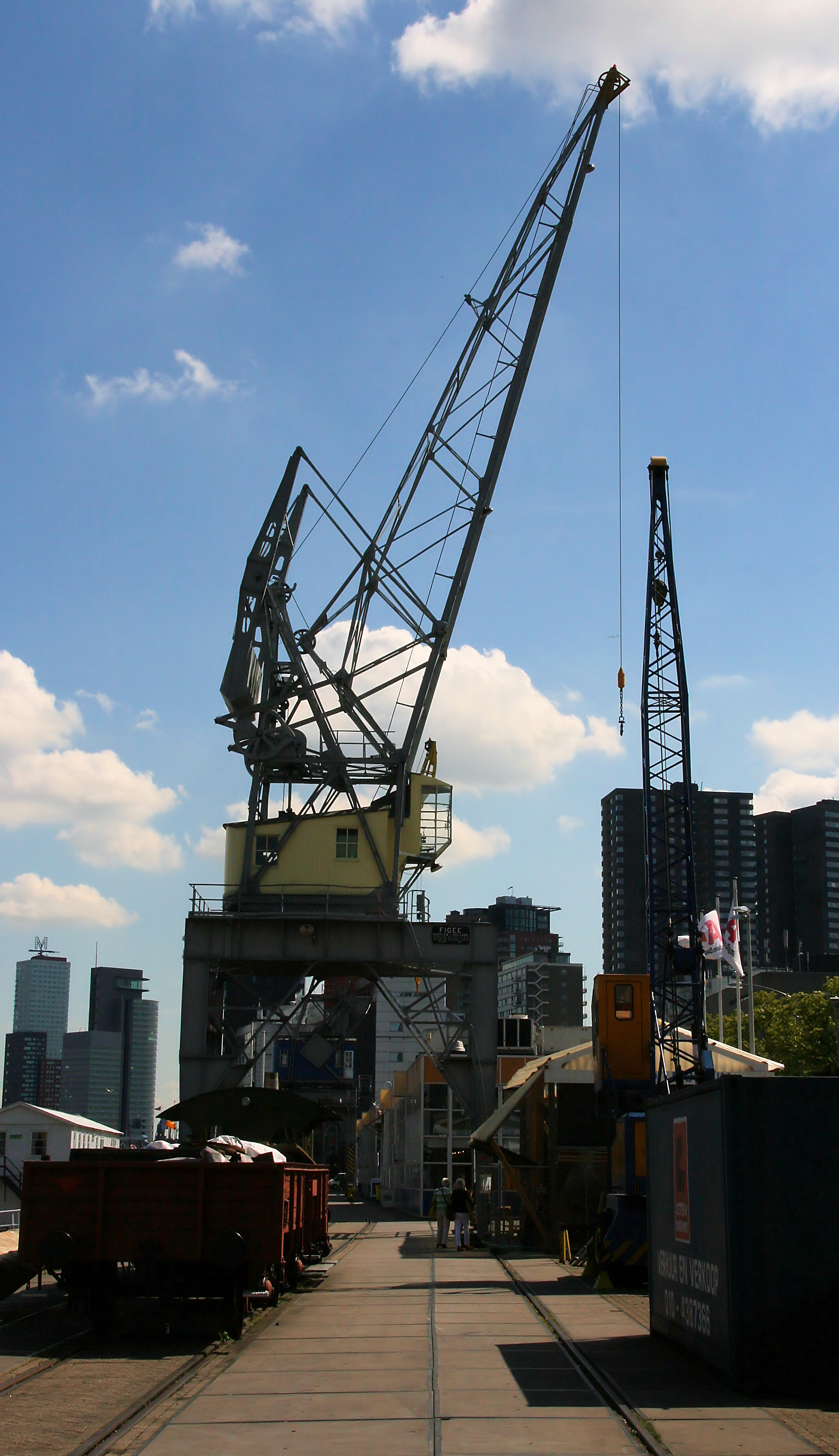
Crane by Figee, now at the Haven Museum, Rotterdam.

Hendrik Figee (May 28, 1838, in Haarlem – December 3, 1907, in Haarlem) was a Dutch businessman and entrepreneur credited with expanding the Haarlem factory Figee Crane Company into an international manufacturer of cranes.

== Biography ==
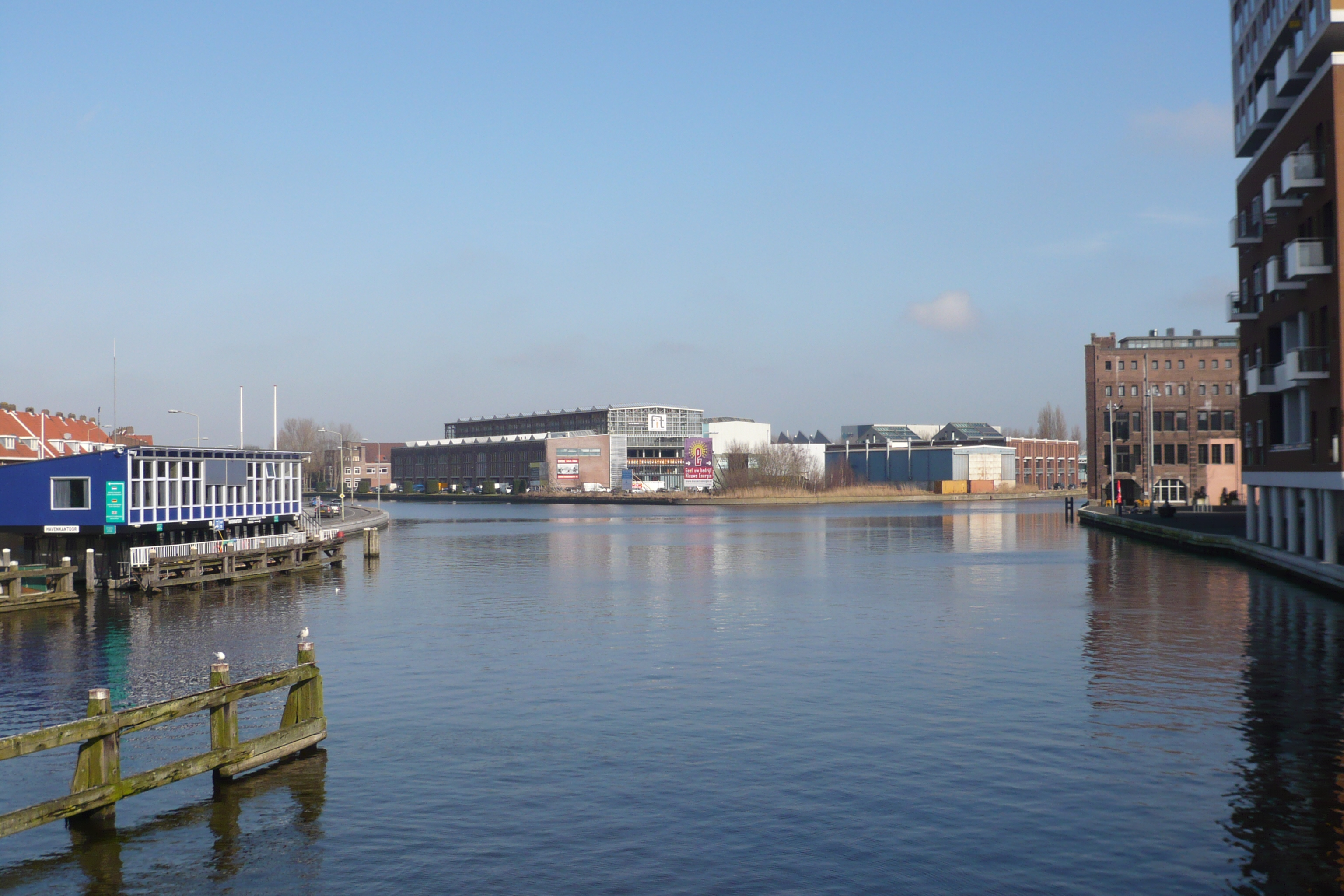
View of old Figee factory (center) on the Spaarne river, now converted to office space. On the left is the harbor master's office of Haarlem, and on the right is the old Droste factory building.

He was the son of Hendrik Figee the elder, who attended grade school and later became a surveyor. After passing his surveyor's exam, he went to work for his father in his steam engine factory on the Spaarne river. In 1866, he became a full partner along with his brother Thomas and the company was renamed Gebroeders Figee (Figee brothers). He also helped start the crane manufacturing company Figee & De Kruyff in Amsterdam and the ironworks called the Haarlems IJzergieterij. In 1883, his brother Thomas bought the shipbuilding company Conrad on the other side of the Spaarne river. Werf Conrad had been named after the renowned Dutch engineer Frederik Willem Conrad (1800–1870). Figee wanted to make dredgers (baggermolens). The dredgers needed cranes on board, and these were supplied by Figee, which became a specialist in building cranes. From 1898 to 1902, He was a member of the board of the Maatschappij voor Nijverheid en Handel, Haarlem and was also a board member of the Colonial Museum, formerly located in villa Welgelegen.
