= Hendrick Fisher =

American politician

Hendrick Fisher (also spelled Fischer, Visscher; 1697 – c. 1778) represented Somerset County in the New Jersey Colonial Assembly, was one of three delegates representing New Jersey at the Stamp Act Congress in New York in 1765, was elected to New Jersey's Committee of Correspondence, served as a member of the Committee of Safety, was President of the Colonial Assembly, and was the first President of the Provincial Congress of New Jersey. In 1775, he was labeled an arch traitor and "Enemy of the Crown". He was also a founder and first President of the board of trustees of Queen's College (now Rutgers University). His great-great grandson was Hendrick V. Fisher, who was a businessman and served in the Illinois General Assembly.

His death is engraved as 1779 on his gravestone, but historian A. Van Doren Honeyman believed it might have been an error and should have been 1778.

His homestead and grave are currently located near St. Andrew Memorial Church in Franklin Township, Somerset County, New Jersey.

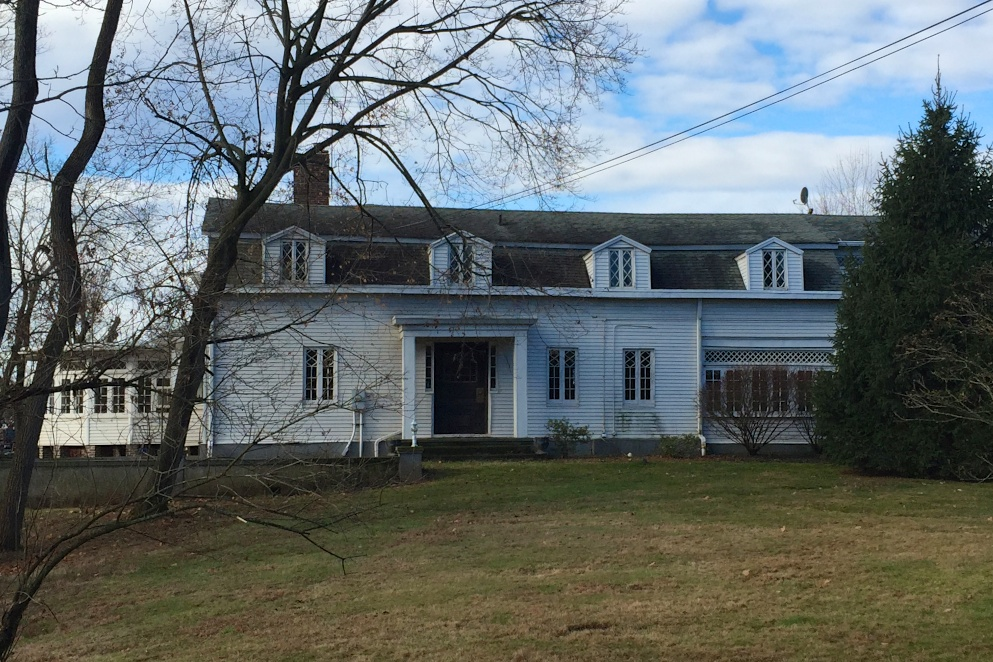
Hendrick Fisher homestead, built in 1688

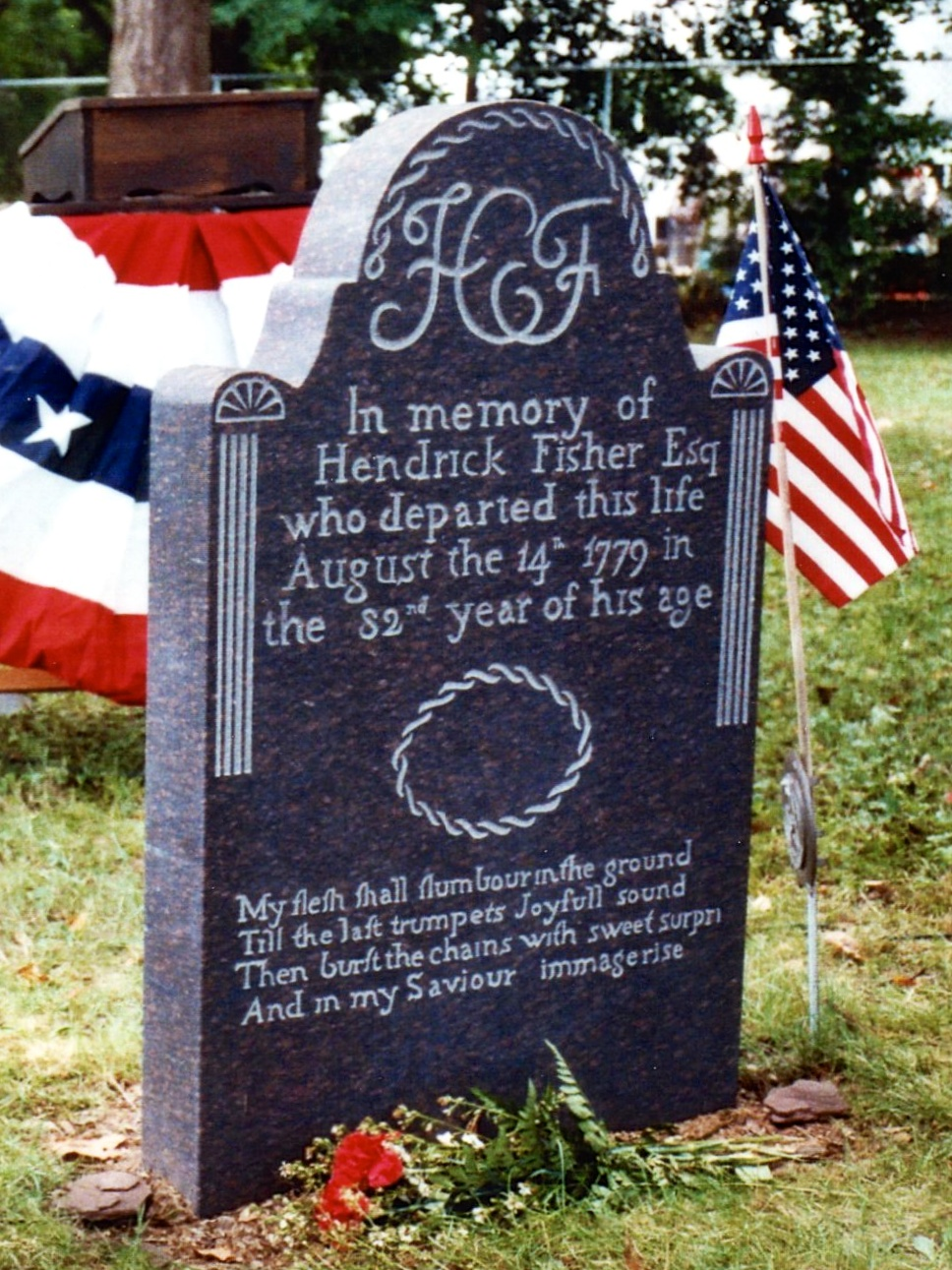
Hendrick Fisher gravestone

== Bibliography ==
Honeyman, A. Van Doren (1919). "Hendrick Fisher–The Real German-American". Somerset County Historical Quarterly. Vol. 8. pp. 1–17.
