= Hendrik Sumendap =

- Born: June 9, 1948 (age 76); Tareran Sulawesi Utara, Indonesia
- Occupation: Executive Secretary of the Southern Asia-Pacific Division of Seventh-day Adventists
- Spouse: Octofien Sumakul

Hendrik Sumendap (born June 9, 1948 in Tareran, North Sulawesi, Indonesia ) was elected the executive secretary of the Seventh-day Adventist Church in Southern Asia-Pacific Division of Seventh-day Adventists to replace GT Ng who accepted the call to become the General Conference of Seventh-day Adventists associate secretary in 2007. He was the second Indonesian Adventist to be elected to the post, the first one being Pastor Alex Rantung. Prior to that position, Sumendap was the Department Director for the Sabbath School and Personal Ministries since 1996.

He was succeeded by Pastor Joshua Mok when he accepted a call to be a local church pastor in New Jersey, United States.

== Secretarial service ==
Sumendap was elected to the office of the executive secretary in 2007 after Ng accepted the call to the General Conference Headquarters in Maryland, United States of America. His term was cut short due to his retirement. However, during this short term, Sumendap's office was involved in an extensive effort to trim down the church membership figures of the SSD. After coming to office, it became apparent to him that the current membership figures could not be the same with the real figures of church membership. He then initiated efforts to identify the real figures of the church membership in SSD countries. The results was 300,000 church members were identified missing after the updated count.

== Previous roles ==
Before his appointment as executive secretary, Pastor Sumendap was the Sabbath School and personal ministries director of SSD from 1997. During his term as a department director, he played a major role in developing training programs for the 4 Phases of Leadership Certification for the church members. He was also instrumental in organizing the "world's largest lay congress" in the Seventh-day Adventist Church with 75,000 people in attendance at Mountain View College, Bukidnon, Philippines.

Prior to serving in the church at the division level, he was the dean for the School of Theology and later vice-president for student affairs of Mount Klabat College; he was later appointed as associate director of the Church Growth Institute of the Far Eastern Division of the Seventh-day Adventist Church then based in Adventist International Institute of Advanced Studies, from 1993-1996. As a church administrator, he has also been a church pastor, an editor, a departmental leader in the conference and union level, a college professor, a teacher, and elementary school principal.

Preceded by G.T. Ng	Executive Secretary of the Southern Asia-Pacific Division of Seventh-day Adventists; 2007 - 2008	Succeeded by Joshua Mok
