= Hendrick V. Fisher =

American businessman and politician

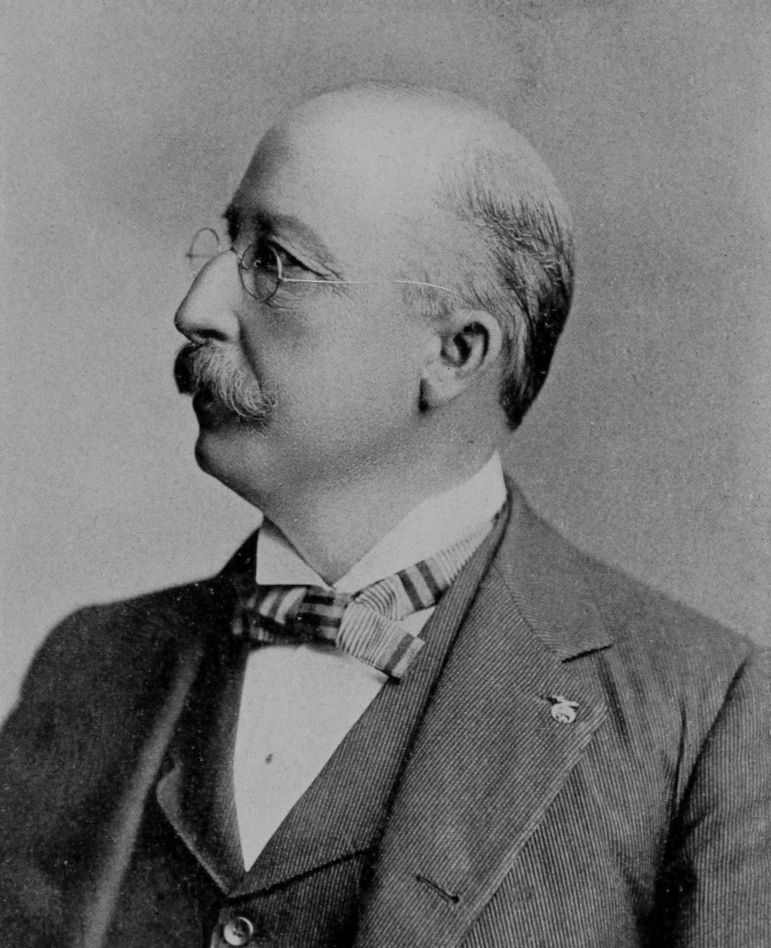

Member of the Illinois Senate
- In office 1895–1899

Member of the Illinois House of Representatives
- In office 1887–1891

Personal details
- Born: Hendrick Vastine Fisher; October 15, 1846 Wilkes-Barre, Pennsylvania, U.S.
- Died: April 19, 1909 (aged 62) Excelsior Springs, Missouri, U.S.
- Party: Republican
- Occupation: Businessman, politician
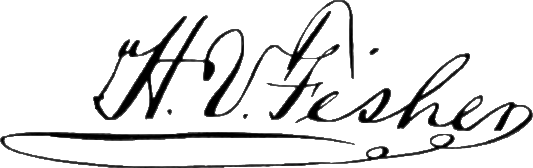
- Signature

Hendrick Vastine Fisher (October 15, 1846 – April 19, 1909) was an American businessman and politician.

== Biography ==
Fisher was born in Wilkes-Barre, Pennsylvania. He went to Wyoming Seminary and then worked for the railroad in the office as a clerk. In 1868, Fisher moved to Aurora, Illinois. Fisher then settled in Geneseo, Illinois in 1869. Fisher was involved with the general merchandise business. He was also involved with the manufacture of hardware and stoves. Fisher served in the Illinois House of Representatives from 1887 to 1891 and was a Republican. Fisher also served in the Illinois Senate from 1895 to 1899. He served as president pro tempore of the senate in 1897. From 1889 to 1893, Fisher served as aide-de-camp on the staff of Illinois Governor Joseph W. Fifer and was commissioned a colonel. Fisher died in Excelsior Springs, Missouri after suffering a stroke. Fisher was the great-great grandson of Hendrick Fisher who was involved with Rutgers University.
