= Hendrik Reekers =

Dutch painter

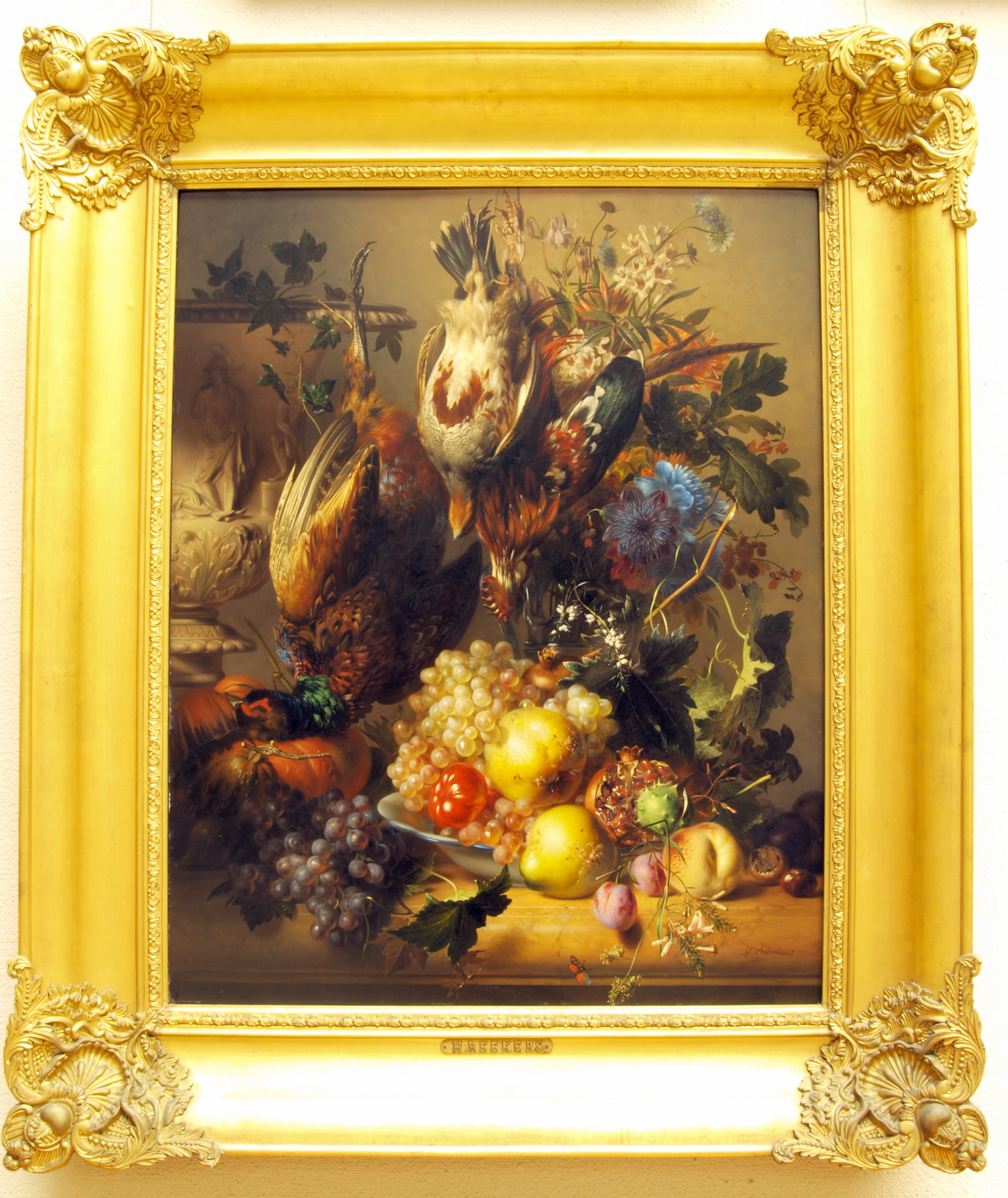
Still life with fruit, flowers and bounty from the hunt, 1847, collection Teylers Museum

Hendrik Reekers (1815 in Haarlem – 1854 in Haarlem), was a 19th-century still life painter from the Netherlands.

== Biography ==
According to the RKD he was the son of Johannes Reekers (1790–1858), a teacher at the Haarlemse Teekenacademie. He became a pupil of his father and Georgius Jacobus Johannes van Os. When he came of age he gave drawing lessons himself and from 1837 began to paint. He participated in the art exhibitions of 1839 & 1841, and won a silver medal in The Hague in 1841. In 1843 he became a member of the Academie of Beeldende Kunsten in Amsterdam. In 1847 he was allowed to exhibit at the British Institution. He is known for his still life and hunting pieces, and his pupils were Hendrik Jan Hein, his brother Johannes Reekers the younger, and Jan Striening.
