= RIK =

Rik or RIK may refer to:

== Rik ==
- Rik (given name), a masculine given name
- Rik (verse), praising mantras of Rigaveda Samhita
- Rik, Iran, a village
- "Rik" (song), 2016, by Albin Johnsén and Mattias Andréasson
- Riq, tambourine used in Arabic music
- Rik (Ukrainian), Ukrainian term used to say about year

== RIK ==
- Carrillo Airport, Costa Rica
- Cyprus Broadcasting Corporation (Greek: Ραδιοφωνικό Ίδρυμα Κύπρου)
- Redbergslids IK, a Swedish handball team
