= Science shop =

A science shop is a facility, often attached to a specific department of a university or an NGO, that provides independent participatory research support in response to concerns experienced by civil society. It's a demand-driven and bottom-up approach to research. Their work can be described as community-based research (CBR).

Science shops were first established in the Netherlands in the 1970s and their main function is to increase both public awareness and provide access to science and technology to laypeople or non-profit organizations.

In practice, this means civil society organizations will have access to scientific research at low or no cost. Science shops that are based at universities give students opportunities to do community-based research as part of their curriculum. Science shops are not restricted to the natural sciences; they cover disciplines across the social sciences and humanities.

Science shops are managed and operated by both permanent staff members and students who screen questions provided by members of civil society. Science shop staff use these questions to provide challenging problems to both research students and university faculty members in hope of finding solutions to the question. Students who participate in science shop projects often can acquire credits toward their degree. Also, many students do their postgraduate work on problems referred to by science shops.

Numerous science shops have developed expertise in specific areas. For example, the first science shop attached to the chemistry department at Utrecht University was particularly skilled in evaluation reports on soil analysis.

Clients are often directed to the science shop that is best suited to address their particular concerns. The Dutch system has provided many benefits to groups such as environmentalists, workers, and social workers. Science shops, in general, have aided environmentalists in better analyzing industrial pollutants, and helped workers to better evaluate the safety and employment consequences of new production processes. Moreover, they have enhanced the understanding of social workers in how to deal with disaffected teenagers.

The Dutch system has inspired science shops in nations across Europe such as Denmark, Austria, Germany, Norway, the UK, Belgium, Romania and Portugal . Moreover, there are currently science shops in countries outside of Europe such as Canada.

== Science shops and the EU ==
The European Commission (EC), which initiates and implements EU policies and spends EU funds, has been an important factor behind the international interest and progress of the science shop movement. The EC has financed studies and projects, such as SCIPAS, InterActs, ISSNET and TRAMS which contributed to the development of new science shops.

The subsequent projects, namely PERARES (Public Engagement in Research and Researchers Engaging with Society), EnRRICH (Enhancing Responsible Research and Innovation through Curricula in Higher Education), SciShops and InSPIRES received funding from the European Union’s 7th Framework Programme and the Horizon 2020 research and innovation programme.

=== PERARES Project ===
The Public Engagement with Research And Research Engagement with Society (PERARES) project was a four-year project funded by the European Community’s 7th Framework Programme. The project started in 2010 and aimed to strengthen public engagement in research (PER) by involving researchers and Civil Society Organisations (CSOs) in the formulation of research agendas and the research process. It used various debates (or dialogues) on Science to actively articulate research request of civil society. These are forwarded to research institutes and results are used in the next phase of the debate. Thus, these debates move ‘upstream’ into agenda settings. For this, partners linked existing debate formats – such as science café’s, science festivals, online-forums – with the Science Shop network - already linking civil society and research institutes. To be able to answer to research requests, it was necessary to enlarge and strengthen the network of research bodies doing research for/with CSOs. Thus, ten new science shop like facilities throughout Europe are started, mentored by experienced partners. Guidelines to evaluate the impact of engagement activities are developed and tested.

=== EnRRICH Project ===
The Enhancing Responsible Research and Innovation through Curricula in Higher Education (EnRRICH) project ran from July 2015 – December 2017. It has improved the capacity of students and staff in higher education to develop knowledge, skills and attitudes to support the embedding of Responsible Research and Innovation (RRI) in curricula by responding to the research needs of society as expressed by civil society organisations (CSOs). To reach this aim, the project has identified, developed, piloted and disseminated good practice and relevant resources to embed the 5 RRI policy agendas ’Public Engagement’, ‘Science Education’, ‘Open Access’, ‘Ethics’ and ‘Gender’ in academic curricula across Europe. Through sharing learning and initiating discussion and debates at institutional, national and international levels both within the project consortium and beyond it, the EnRRICH project created a better awareness of, and enhance the policy context for, RRI in curricula and thereby produce more responsible and responsive graduates and researchers.

=== SciShops Project ===
The SciShops project ran from September 2017 to February 2020. Its aim is to build on and expand the capacity of the science shops ecosystem in Europe and beyond. As part of the SciShops project, at least ten new university- and non-university-based science shops were established in Europe by project partners. The SciShops team aims to demonstrate the benefits of starting a science shop for different kinds of organisation, as well as to show how civil society gains from collaborating with science shops in community-based participatory research.

=== InSPIRES Project ===
The Ingenious Science Shops to Promote Participatory Innovation, Research and Equity in Science (InSPIRES project) brings together civil society, practitioners and other stakeholders in Europe, Africa and Latin America, to co-design, jointly pilot and implement innovative science shops models. InSPIRES seeks to support science shops that approach vulnerable sectors and unorganized groups of civil society, both in urban and rural areas.

Working principally but not exclusively in health and environmental issues, InSPIRES models aim to integrate Responsible Research and Innovation, Open Science and Impact Evaluation in order to promote inclusive and culturally adaptable science shop projects to be accurate and responsive to civil society needs and concerns. From April 2017 until March 2021, InSPIRES partners have proposed to conduct 76 projects.

== Sources ==
- www.livingknowledge.org - The International Science Shop Network
- http://www.livingknowledge.org/projects/perares/
- www.enrrich.eu
- Sardar, Ziauddin and Loon, Borin Van. 2001. Introducing Science. USA: Totem Books (UK: Icon Books).
