= Henricus Jacobus Tollens =

Dutch photographer and painter

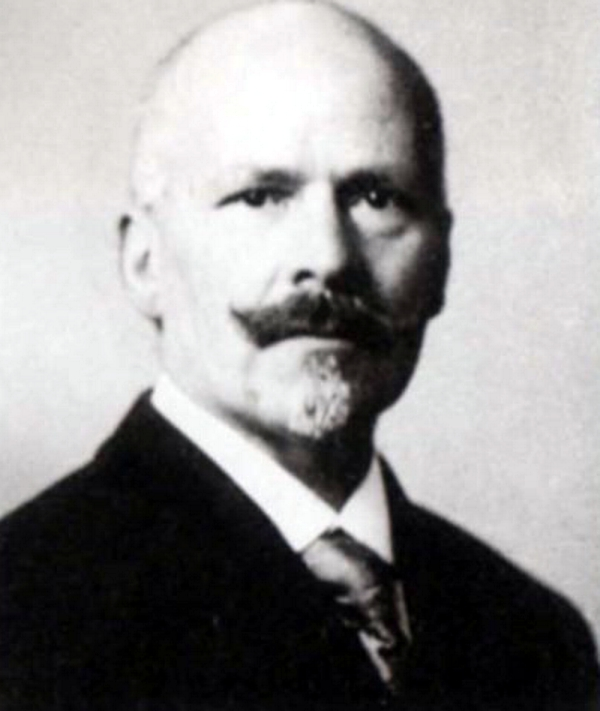
H.J. Tollens, c. 1900

Henricus Jacobus Tollens (13 June 1864 in Dordrecht – 29 July 1936 in Hillegersberg) was a Dutch photographer and painter. He was one of the first Dutch professional photographers and is notable mainly for his photos of the city of Dordrecht.

== Life and work ==
Tollens was born in 1864 in Dordrecht. His parents were Carolus Henricus Tollens (1824—1886), a coppersmith, and Hendrina Willemina Stoffels (1826—1901), a courier. At the age of 17, Tollens decided to become a photographer, but at the time there was no professional education for photographers in the Netherlands, and Tollens started to work with photographers, first Karel Le Grand and later Johann Georg Hameter in Dordrecht. When Hameter died on 1 January 1885, his widow signed a contract with Tollens who in 1890 started to run former Hameter's studio. The studio included three branches, in Dordrecht, Roermond (until 1898), and Eindhoven (until 1913). In 1889 he married Geertruida Johanna Teeuwen, and they had seven children, one son and six daughters.

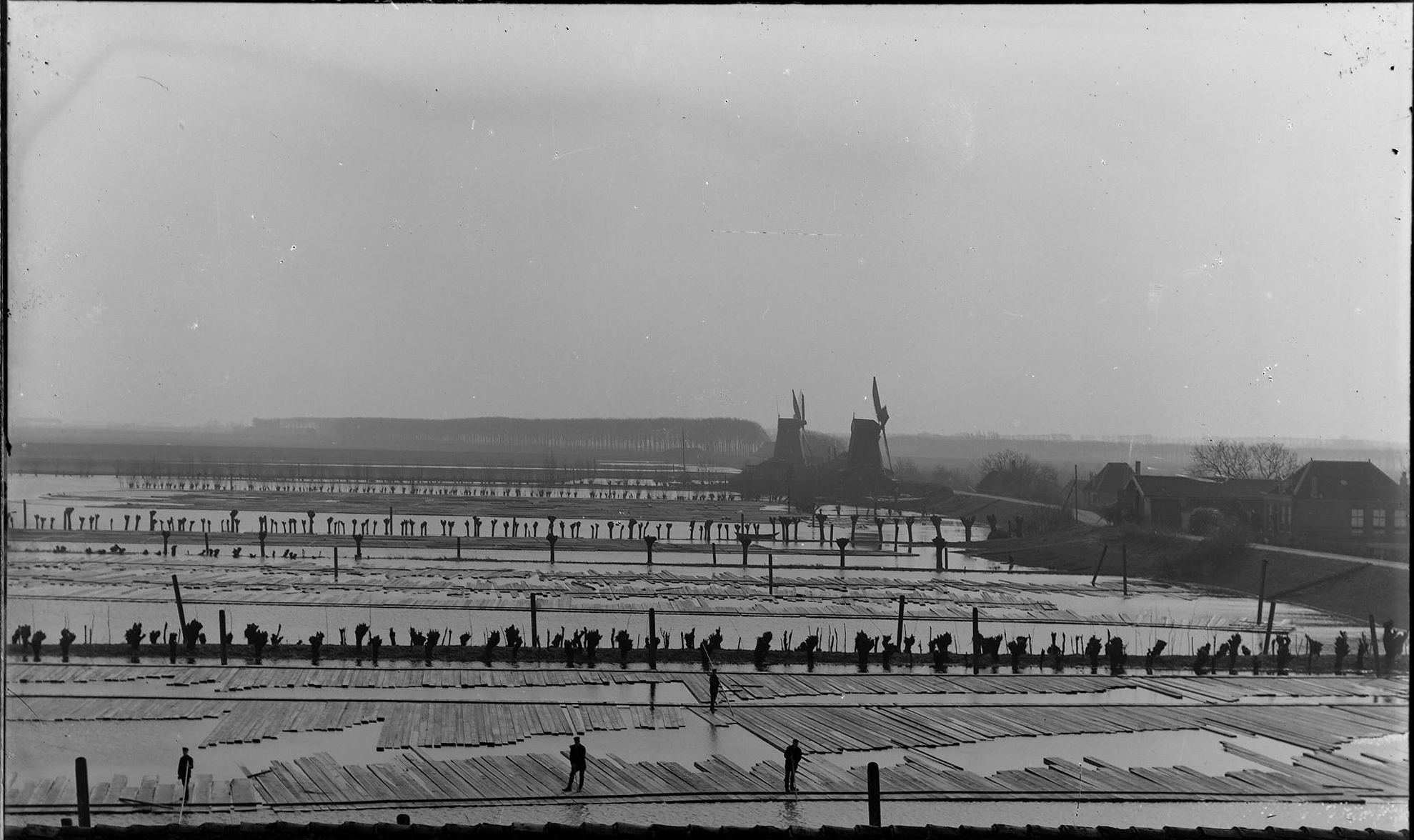
A view from the Nagtegaal Mill in Dordrecht, between 1900 and 1906

Tollens' work was influenced by the developments of photography in Germany. He was a member of the Deutsche Photographen Verein, which in 1888 awarded hem a prize for an art photograph. Tollens thereby became the first Dutch photographer who was recognized as an artist. In 1890, he became a co-founder of the Nederlandsche Fotografen Vereeniging, an organization of Dutch professional photographers in Amsterdam. He was also a member of Dordrechtsche Kunstkring, an informal organization founded in 1897 which included artists, architects, and musicians from Dordrecht.

Around 1900 Tollens, together with several other photographers from Dordrecht, collaborated with companies printing postcards. He made many landscape photos of the city and was best known for his industrial landscapes. At the same time, his business was developing successfully, and after 1912 he never exhibited, devoting all his time to commercial photography. After his wife died in 1920, he stopped taking commercial photographs and started to paint instead. In 1923 he sold his house in Dordrect, and in 1924 moved to Nijmegen to the family of his daughter Wilhelmina. Eventually the family moved to Rotterdam, and Tollens lived in Hillegersberg, a quarter of Rotterdam. He died there on 29 July 1936 and was buried in Dordrectht.
