= Louise Charlotte de Neufville-Ritter =

Dutch painter and pianist (1779–1859)

- Portrait by Ludwig Gottlieb Portman after a drawing by George Nikolaus Ritter, 1803
- Born: Louise Charlotte Ritter
- Baptised: 7 September 1779; Amsterdam
- Died: 23 February 1859; The Hague
- Education: Pupil of George Nikolaus Ritter

Louise Charlotte de Neufville-Ritter (baptised 7 September 1779 – 23 February 1859), also known as Louise Charlotte de Neufville, born Ritter, was a Dutch miniature painter, draughtswoman and pianist.

== Life ==
De Neufville-Ritter was baptised in Amsterdam and died in The Hague.

She was a daughter of the miniature painter George Nikolaus Ritter, originally from the German city of Heilbronn. Ritter, who lived in Amsterdam and died there in 1809, taught her drawing and painting.

On 20 March 1801 she and Pierre de Neufville registered their intention to marry (ondertrouw) in Amsterdam; according to Hoffmann they married in 1802. He was of French origin, was born on 5 March 1762, worked as a portrait painter and died in The Hague in 1844. By 1864 one of their daughters had worked for many years as a piano teacher in Antwerp.

She lived in Amsterdam until 1820. She then stayed briefly in Brussels and later settled in The Hague.

== Music ==
She took piano lessons from Neumann, Anton Fodor and Jan Willem Wilms. She also played the harp. Around the age of eleven she wrote variations on a minuet from Don Giovanni. These were shown to Joseph Haydn, who according to Hoffmann was impressed by them. The "Madlle Ritter" who played a piano concerto by Steibelt at Felix Meritis in 1801 was probably Louise Charlotte. The Viennese pianist Joseph Wölfl wrote a few lines of admiring verse in her album in Amsterdam on 23 April 1805.

She performed as an amateur and was not paid for her concerts. Reviewing a concert in 1814, a correspondent of the Allgemeine musikalische Zeitung wrote that no piece was too hard for her and that in skill she could compare with the best pianists. He found her playing lacking in tenderness, however, and thought she often struck the keys too hard. In 1815 she played a piano concerto by Ries and her own variations on the song Freut euch des Lebens, which she later published. In 1816 she performed in Amsterdam at a concert of the amateur society Harmonica. For a music edition of her own she drew and etched the vignette herself. Later she gave up music and devoted herself only to miniature painting. Hoffmann counts her among the first known Dutch women pianists.

== Painting ==
As an amateur she made miniature portraits, which Van Eynden and Van der Willigen described as neat and good likenesses. She also painted and drew genre scenes, figures and allegories. At the Amsterdam exhibition of 1813 she showed an allegorical scene with a woman, a dog and a tree in a landscape. When Tsar Alexander was staying in Brussels, she presented him with a miniature of a woman from Zaandam in local dress. He rewarded her with a costly belt clasp: an amethyst set with diamonds.

She was a member of the drawing academy of Antwerp. From 1822 she was an honorary member of the Koninklijke Akademie van Beeldende Kunsten (Royal Academy of Fine Arts) in Amsterdam.

The poet Pieter Pijpers praised her talent for painting and music in a poem. The first volume of his poem Eemlandsch Tempe (1803) contains a portrait of her, a stipple etching by Ludwig Gottlieb Portman after a drawing by her father. The same volume has a portrait of Pijpers on its title page, which Portman made after a drawing by her. Reinier Vinkeles made an etching and engraving after a painted portrait of Pijpers by her.

The Rijksmuseum holds a drawing by her of a man who may be George Clifford. The collection of Leiden University Library includes a portrait drawing of a young man with a moustache from 1820.

== Gallery ==
Borstbeeld in ovaal, portret van Georg (?) Clifford (Oval bust portrait of Georg (?) Clifford), 1789–1895. Rijksmuseum

Borstbeeld van jonge man met snor (Bust of a young man with a moustache), 1820. Leiden University Library

Borstbeeld van een jongeman in groene jas (Bust of a young man in a green coat), 19th century. Leiden University Library

Portret van de dichter Pieter Pypers (Portrait of the poet Pieter Pypers), print by Ludwig Gottlieb Portman after her drawing, 1803. Rijksmuseum

Portret van de schrijver Pieter Pypers (Portrait of the writer Pieter Pypers), etching and engraving by Reinier Vinkeles after her painting, 1786–1809. Rijksmuseum
