= Cornelia Aletta van Hulst =

Dutch painter

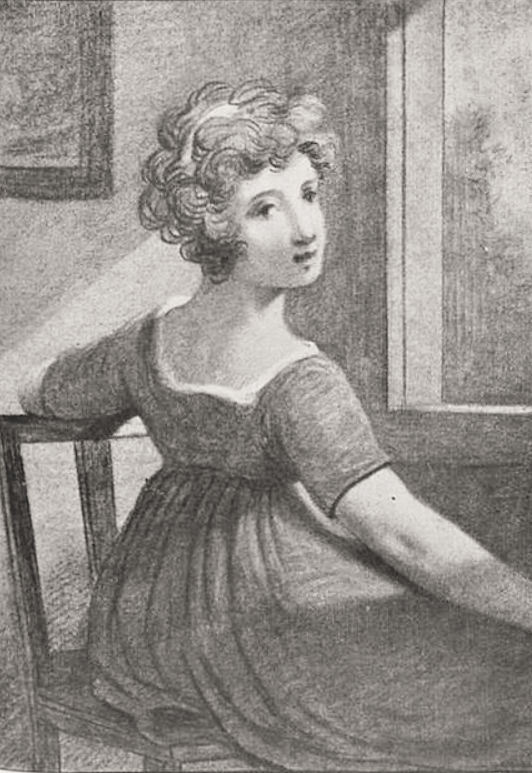
Portrait of the young C.A. van Hulst by her grandfather Jurriaan Andriessen

Cornelia Aletta van Hulst (19 January 1797 – 7 November 1870) was a Dutch painter.

Cornelia Aletta van Hulst was born, lived and worked all her life in Amsterdam. She was taught by her grandfather Jurriaan Andriessen and uncle Christiaan Andriessen. She worked often making copies of other artists' works, primarily painting landscapes. She died on 7 November 1870.
