= Johannes van Dreght =

Dutch decorative painter

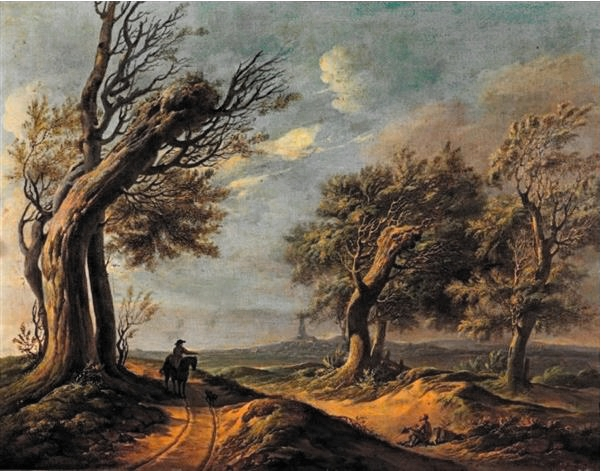
Horseman and Traveler in a Landscape

Johannes van Dreght (11 November 1737, Amsterdam - 7 October 1807, Amsterdam) was a Dutch decorative painter; known for his work on fireplaces, carriages, yachts, sleds and fans.

== Life and work ==
He became a member of the local Guild of Saint Luke in 1758. He married in 1761 and was elected to the Stadstekenacademie, Amsterdam, in 1766 and received an honorary prize from the Drawing Academy. He maintained his home and studio on Kerkstraat, near the Amstel. Politically, he was a supporter of the Patriottentijd; a group that admired the ancient Roman Republic

In 1772, he created a chimney piece (Schoorsteenstuk) for the Town Hall, as well as works for the original Dutch Theater (1774), the buildings at 518 and 520 Herengracht and in the Corvershof, a home belonging to the son of Mayor Joan Corver (1778). In 1781, and again in 1792, he provided the sets and scenery for productions of The Barber of Seville, by Beaumarchais. Much of his work represents a transition to Neoclassicism.

The wallpaper designer, Jurriaen Andriessen, is one of his best known students. The poet, Willem Bilderdijk, learned some etching and drawing techniques from him.

== Sources ==
- D. Carasso, "Idem ardor agit. De schilder Joannes van Dreght en zijn leerling Willem Bilderdijk", in: E.K. Grootes and J. den Haan (Eds.), Geschiedenis, godsdienst, letterkunde. Opstellen aangeboden aan dr. S.B.J. Zilverberg ter gelegenheid van zijn afscheid van de Universiteit van Amsterdam, Roden 1989, p. 208-220. Online
- De verzameling Van Eeghen. Amsterdamse tekeningen 1600-1950, Gemeentearchief Amsterdam (1989) ISBN 978-90-663-0139-9
