= Wouter Johannes van Troostwijk =

Dutch painter

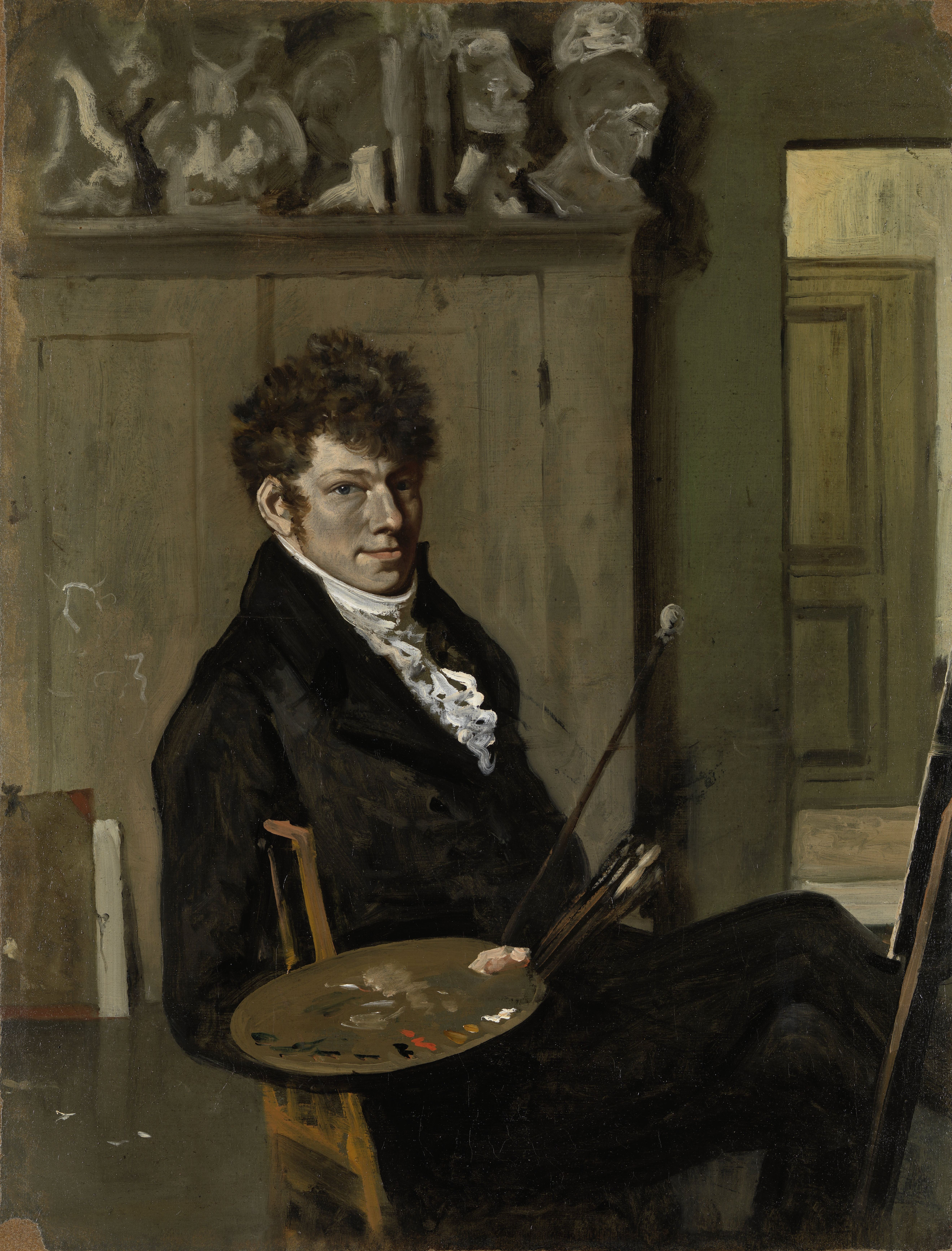
Self-portrait (c.1805)

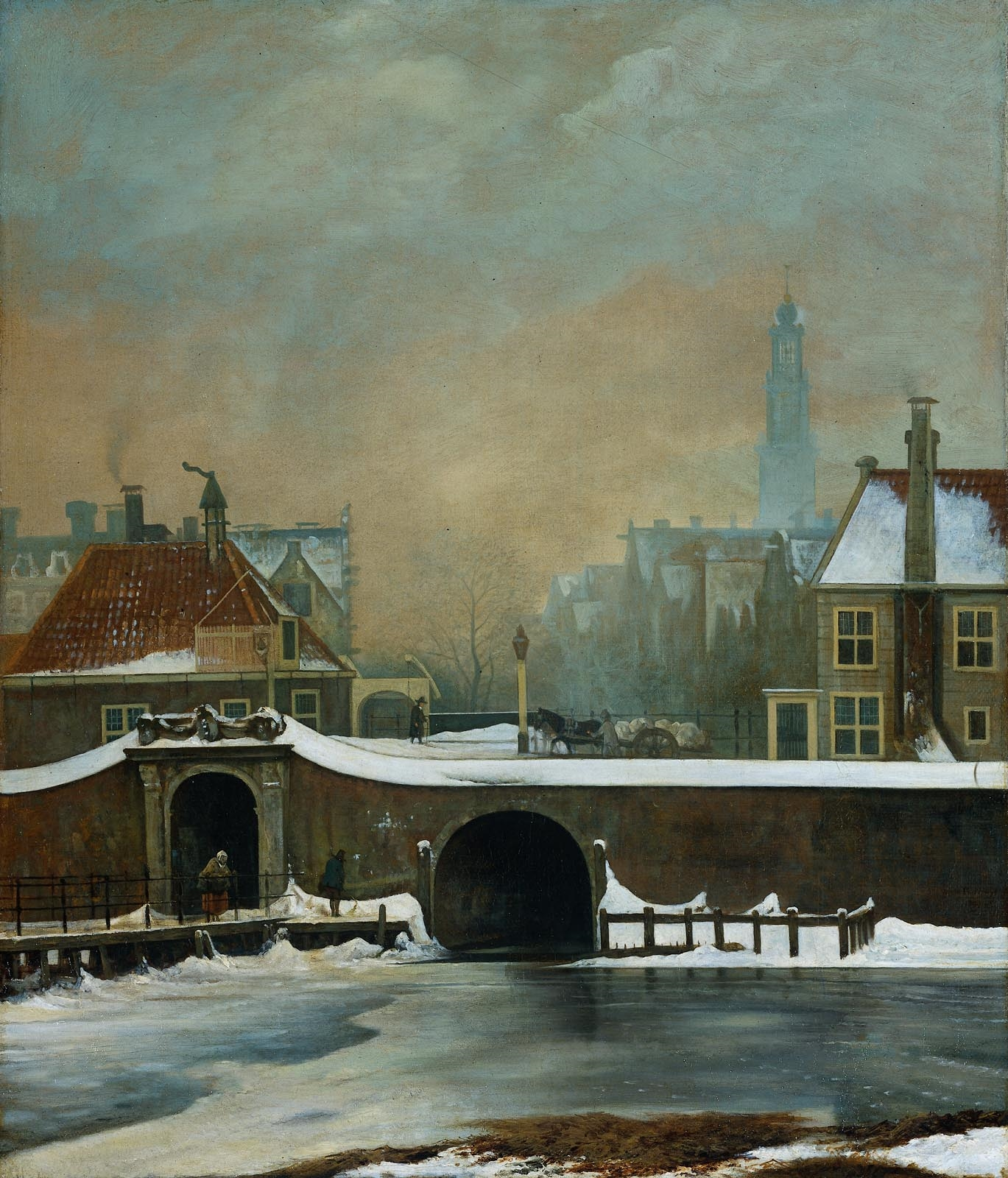
The Raampoort in Amsterdam

Wouter Johannes van Troostwijk (28 May 1782, Amsterdam - 20 September 1810, Amsterdam) was a Dutch painter and etcher. Most of his works are landscapes (featuring cattle) or cityscapes.

== Biography ==
He was born into a wealthy family. His father, Adriaan Paets, was a cloth merchant by trade, but was better known as a chemist and physicist. Many scientists were guests at their home, which inspired his interest in nature. He began sketching and his talent was soon evident, so he was given drawing lessons by Anthonie Andriessen and painting lessons by Anthonie's brother, Juriaan.

In 1803, he enrolled at the "Amsterdam Municipal Academy of Drawing". Two years later he joined the Felix Meritis society, where he won two medals for his work. His style was inspired by Paulus Potter and Jacob van Ruisdael.

He never became a full-time artist, but still he is thought to have influenced late 19th century Dutch painters. After 1805, he served as concierge at the Amsterdam City Hall, where he lived and had his studio. He devoted himself to painting before and after his working hours and used his days off to paint "en plein aire" (as it would later be called). He also took up etching; when he burned his foot and had to spend his time sitting at home.

Ultimately, his passion for painting outdoors proved fatal. He worked too long on a cold Autumn night, came down with a high fever, and succumbed a few days later. Only eight of his paintings are on public display, but there are numerous drawings, sketches and studies.
