= Stadstekenacademie, Amsterdam =

Former art school in Amsterdam, Netherlands

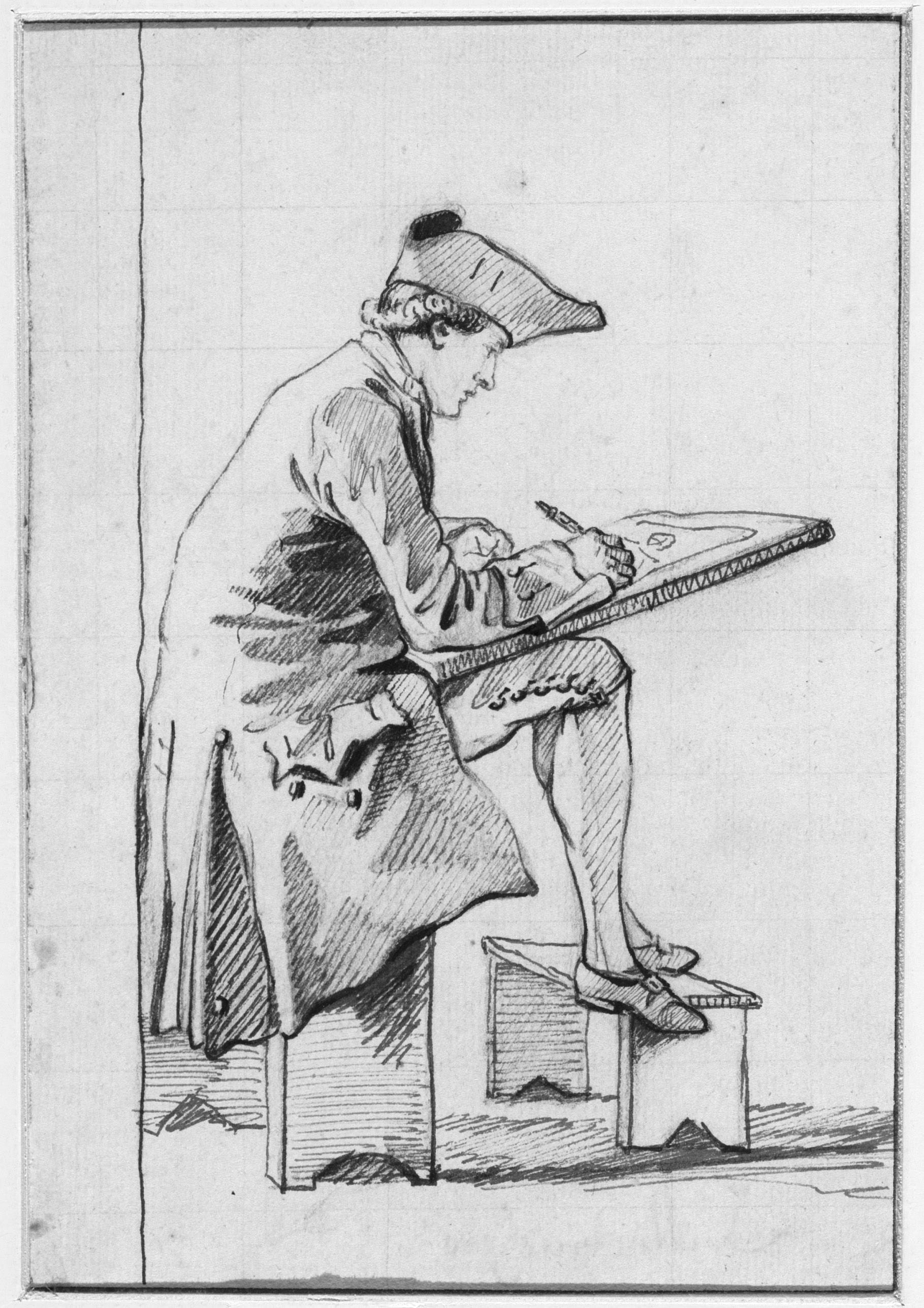
Jurriaen Andriessen, drawn by Reinier Vinkeles in 1764

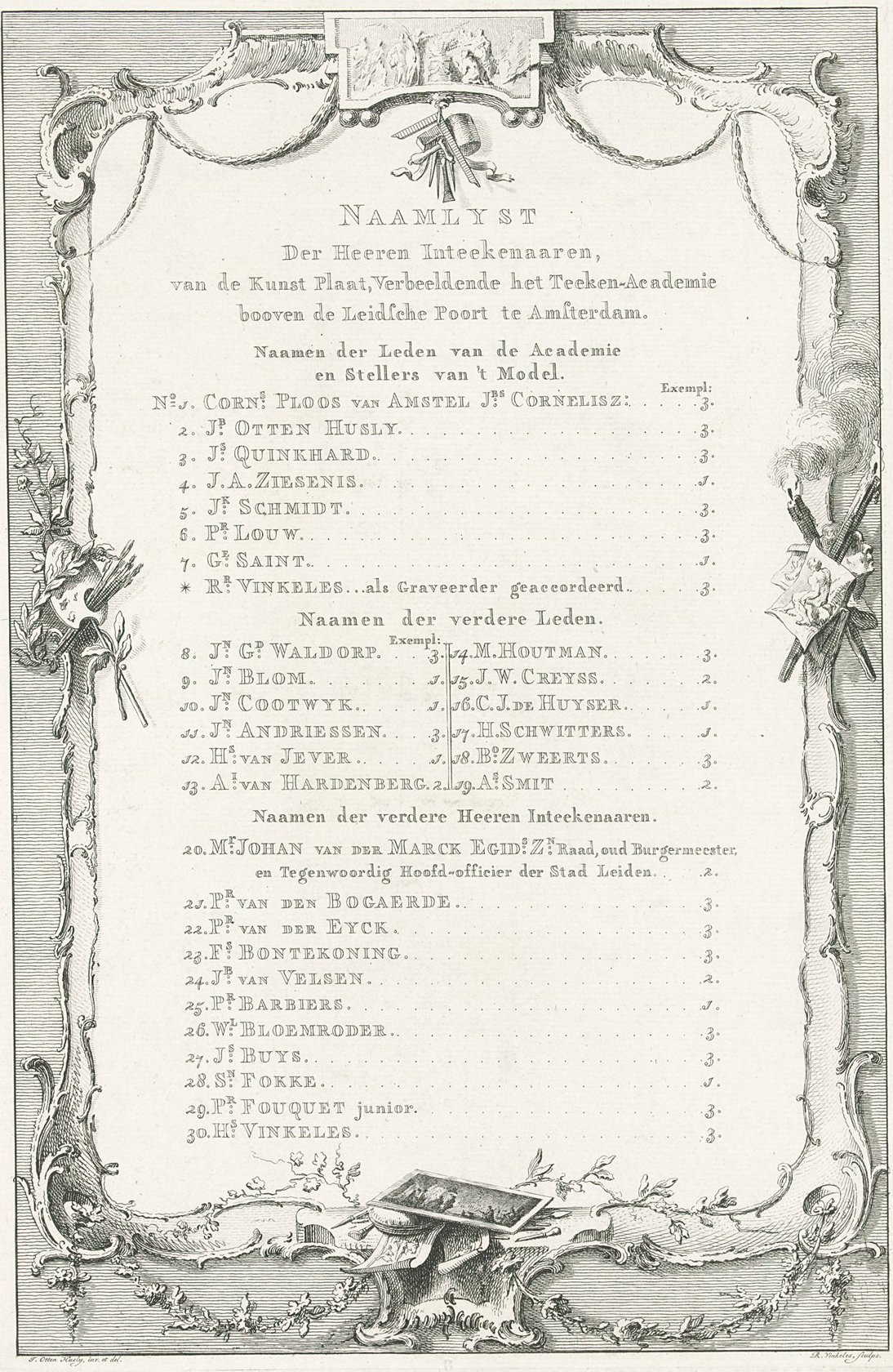
Etching listing the names of the academy's members in 1768

The Stadstekenacademie ("City Drawing Academy", contemporaneous spelling: Stads Teekenacademie, Teeken-Academie or Akademie der Teekenkunst) was an 18th-century art academy in Amsterdam. It was the precursor of the Koninklijke Academie (established 1822) and the Rijksakademie van beeldende kunsten (established 1870). Other Dutch towns such as Haarlem also had a drawing academy.

Artists such as Cornelis Apostool, Jan Willem Pieneman and Wouter Johannes van Troostwijk were educated at the academy.

The primary intention was not to train students to become artists, but rather to bring youth into contact with art as part of their education. There was no formal structure to the education, although students were divided into three stages and were required to attend classes twice a week. The academy organised a yearly drawing competition, awarding the winners gold, silver and bronze medals.

The academy had a number of "honorary members" — non-artists, usually wealthy, influential regenten (members of the ruling class), who could ensure that the academy would be properly housed, and who could finance art supplies and the prizes of the annual competition. In exchange, the regenten received social status from their honorary membership. They could also use the academy for social gatherings, or to receive foreign guests in an impressive manner.

== History ==
The academy was established in 1718 as the Oefenschool der Tekenkunst ("practice school of draughtsmanship"). In 1741, the school was renamed Tekenacademie on the initiative of Jan Maurits Quinkhard and others. The early history was marked by frequent arguments between members, which led most to abandon the school again. However, a new start was made in 1750 with 20 artists and regenten who were art collectors or patrons to the arts.

The Stadstekenacademie was housed in a former city gate, the Leidsepoort, as seen on a 1764 print by Reinier Vinkeles. On 4 December 1767, the school relocated to two chambers in the Amsterdam town hall.

The academy did not have any formal structure until 1765. From that year onwards, non-artists were also asked to serve as director of the school. In 1766-1767, the academy counted 49 artist members and 25 honorary members (non-artists) — a sign that, one year after the formalisation, the academy was doing well.

The school continued to exist until 1822, when King William I of the Netherlands established the Koninklijke Academie ("royal academy"), succeeded in 1870 by the Rijksakademie van beeldende kunsten ("state academy of fine arts").

== Members ==
=== Founders, directors and teachers ===
- Jurriaen Andriessen
- Jacobus Buys
- Hendrick van Cuychem
- Jacob Otten Husly
- Jacques Kuyper
- Hendrik Meijer
- Wouda Piera
- Cornelis Ploos van Amstel
- Jan Maurits Quinkhard
- Izaak Riewert Schmidt
- Reinier Vinkeles
- Jan Wandelaar
- Jacob de Wit
- Anthonie Ziesenis

=== Students ===
- Cornelis Apostool
- Cornelis Borsteegh
- Egbert van Drielst
- Jan Bulthuis
- Abraham Pietersz. Hulk
- Jan Ekels the Younger
- Jacques Kuyper
- Jan Adriaan Antonie de Lelie
- Jacob Maurer
- Hermanus Numan
- Bernard Picart
- Jan Willem Pieneman
- Dirk Sluyter
- Jacob Smies
- Pieter Tanjé
- Wouter Johannes van Troostwijk
