= Ludwig Gottlieb Portman =

German-Dutch engraver (1772–after 1828)

- Born: 14 June 1772; Darmstadt
- Died: after 1828 probably Bussum
- Education: Pupil of Goepfert

Ludwig Gottlieb Portman (14 June 1772 – after 1828), also known as Lodewijk Gottlieb Portman or Louis Portman, was a German-Dutch engraver, draughtsman and art dealer.

== Life ==
Portman as born in Darmstadt and probably died in Bussum. He was a son of Johann Gottlieb Portmann. He learnt engraving from Goepfert, who had himself been a pupil of Rijland. At the age of eighteen he came to Utrecht, and four years later he settled in Amsterdam as an engraver. He was active there until about 1810.

On 23 June 1799 Portman married in Amsterdam. His wife was Antoinetta Catharina Prediger. Their son, the painter Christiaan Julius Lodewijk Portman, was born in Amsterdam on 20 October 1799 and received his first drawing lessons from his father. Another son was Lodewijk Anton Portman (1804–1853). Dirk Sluyter was also a pupil of Portman.

On 18 July 1808 Portman became a member of the fourth class of the Royal Institute. When the Netherlands came entirely under French rule, he left for his native city; from 1810 to 1817 he was active in Darmstadt. In July 1817 he returned to Amsterdam and opened a shop as an art dealer and bookseller, dealing mainly in supplies for painters and draughtsmen. In 1825 he was living in Amsterdam. His son Christiaan Julius Lodewijk later continued the business.

== Work ==
Portman mainly engraved book illustrations. These include illustrations after drawings by Jacques Kuyper and others in Martinus Stuart's Romeinsche Geschiedenissen (Roman histories) and De Mensch (Man). For the second volume of De Mensch, zooals hij voorkomt op den bekenden aardbol (Man, as he appears on the known globe; 1802–1807) he made, among other prints, a print after Kuyper of inhabitants of the Marquesas Islands, coloured with the brush, in line etching combined with stipple engraving. According to Koolhaas-Grosfeld, this technique and the gradual transitions in the colouring gave the prints a softer appearance.

He engraved portraits of, among others, the Utrecht professor Cornelis Willem de Rhoer, the grand pensionary Schimmelpenninck, the physician Deiman and the poet Bilderdijk. Other portraits are those of Jan Nieuwenhuyzen after Adriaan de Lelie, A.C. Bonn after L. Moritz, Adolphus Ypey and H.D. Guyot, head of the institute for the deaf in Groningen.

He also engraved Serafijnen (Seraphim) after J. de Wit; after Kuyper, an emblematic print concerning Pope Pius VI and a similar memorial print for Nieuwenhuyzen as founder of the Maatschappij tot Nut van 't Algemeen; and, after W. Hendriks, a memorial print for the society's twenty-fifth anniversary. He worked for Lambertus Antonius Claessens.

According to Van Eynden and Van der Willigen, Portman later gave up engraving, in their view because he foresaw that lithography would bring about the decline of the art of engraving.

== Gallery ==
Portrait of the actress Helena Snoek, 1810. Rijksmuseum

Portrait of Pieter Weiland, linguist and Remonstrant minister, after Johan Bernard Scheffer, 1787–1828. Rijksmuseum

Winkelier en klant (Shopkeeper and customer), after Jacques Kuyper, published by Evert Maaskamp, 1803–1807. Rijksmuseum

Friese vrouwen op het ijs (Frisian women on the ice), after C.F. Bounach and Jan Willem Pieneman, published by Evert Maaskamp, 1804 and/or 1829. Rijksmuseum

Vrouw van Katwijk en van Vollendam (Woman of Katwijk and of Volendam), after Cornelius Overman, 1829. Amsterdam Museum

Binnenkomst van Engelsche en Russische krijgsgevangenen door de Nieuwpoort (Arrival of English and Russian prisoners of war through the Nieuwpoort) in Haarlem, 1799, after Franciscus Andreas Milatz, c. 1800. Noord-Hollands Archief

Double portrait of Napoleon I Bonaparte and Louis Napoleon Bonaparte, 1806–1828. Rijksmuseum

Ruins after the Leiden gunpowder disaster, 1807, after Carel Lodewijk Hansen, published by Evert Maaskamp, 1807. Rijksmuseum

Dike breach at Kedichem, 1809, possibly by Portman, after a print by Reinier Vinkeles after Cornelis van Hardenbergh, published by Evert Maaskamp, 1816. Rijksmuseum

View of the Royal Palace in Amsterdam, after Franciscus Andreas Milatz, published by Evert Maaskamp, 1794–1825. Rijksmuseum
