= Gerrit Jan Michaëlis =

Dutch painter

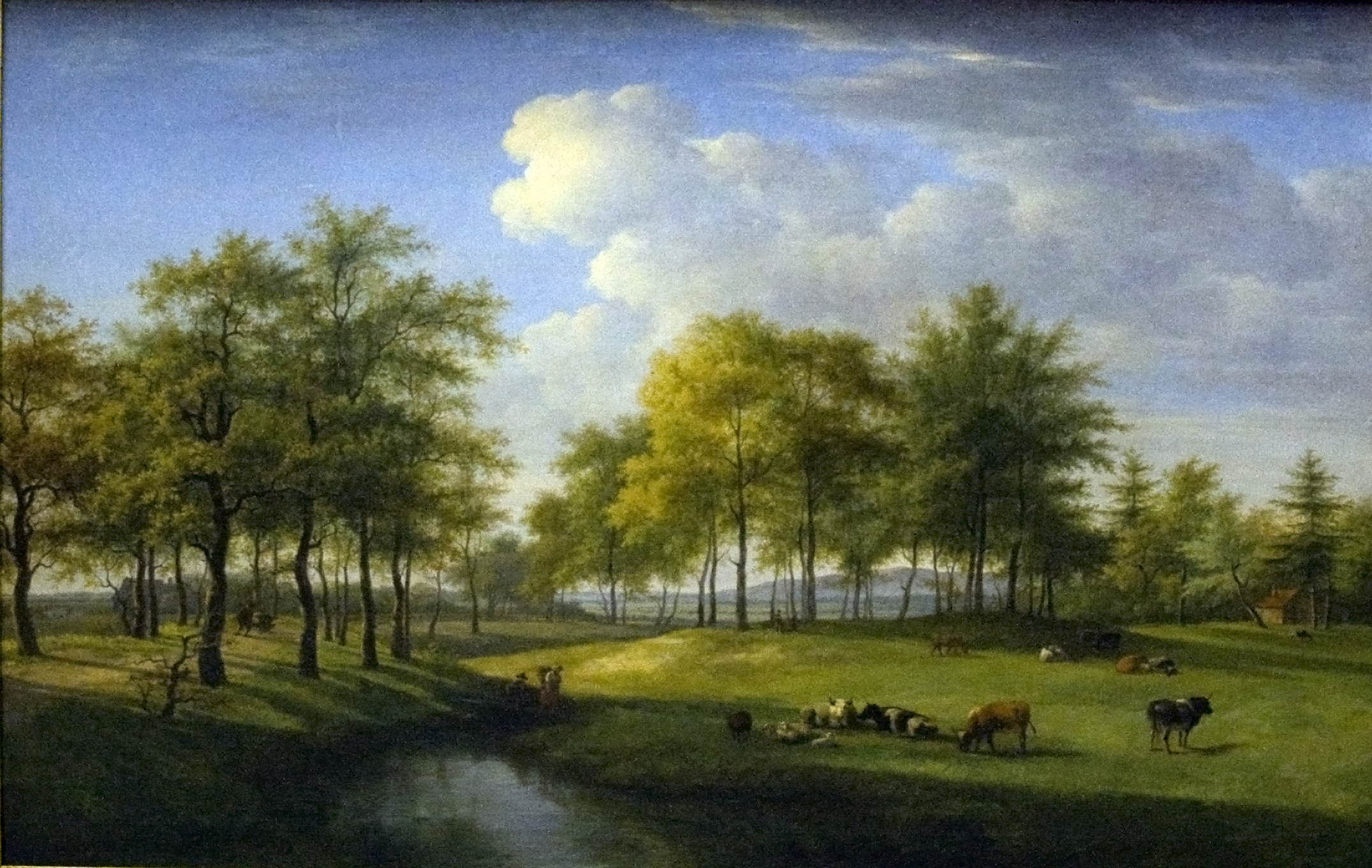
Landscape at Vogelenzang, 1834, Teylers First Painting Gallery

Gerrit Jan Michaëlis (1775–1857) was a painter from the Netherlands, known mainly for his landscapes.

He was born in Amsterdam. He was the son of the sculptor H.C. Michaëlis who studied at the Koninklijke Academie voor Beeldende Kunsten (Amsterdam Royal Academy of Art) and became a member of the Amsterdam drawing society called "Tekengenootschap Zonder Wet of Spreuk". He was the pupil of George Nikolaus Ritter and Jurriaan Andriessen, and won a prize at the Amsterdam drawing academy Felix Meritis in 1805. He continued to send in examples of his art which met with success in Amsterdam competitions in 1808, 1810, 1813, 1814, 1816, and 1818.

He moved to Haarlem to succeed Wybrand Hendriks as the curator and live-in kastelein of the art collection at the Teylers Museum from 1819 to 1854. He is known for his landscapes and was also the director of the Haarlem Stadstekenacademie. He died in 1857 in Haarlem.
