= Jurriaan Andriessen =

Jurriaan Andriessen may refer to:

- Jurriaan Andriessen (artist) (1742–1819), Dutch decorative painter
- Jurriaan Andriessen (composer) (1925–1996), Dutch stage and film composer
