= Lambertus Antonius Claessens =

Flemish engraver and print artist

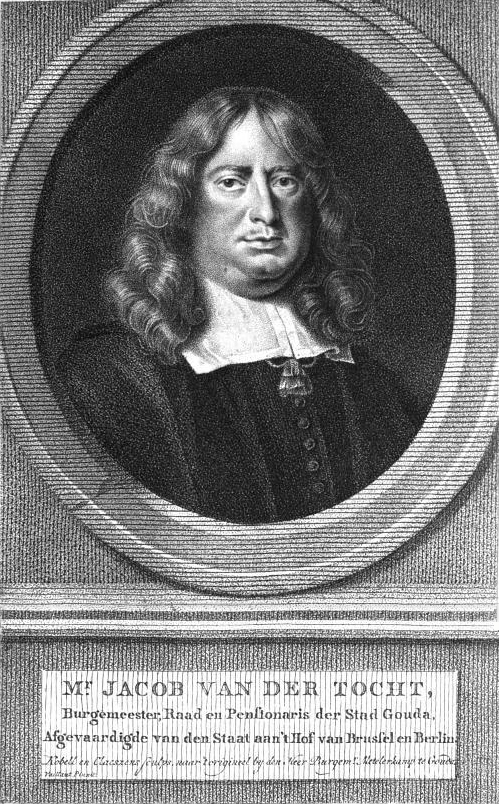
Portrait of Jacob van der Tocht

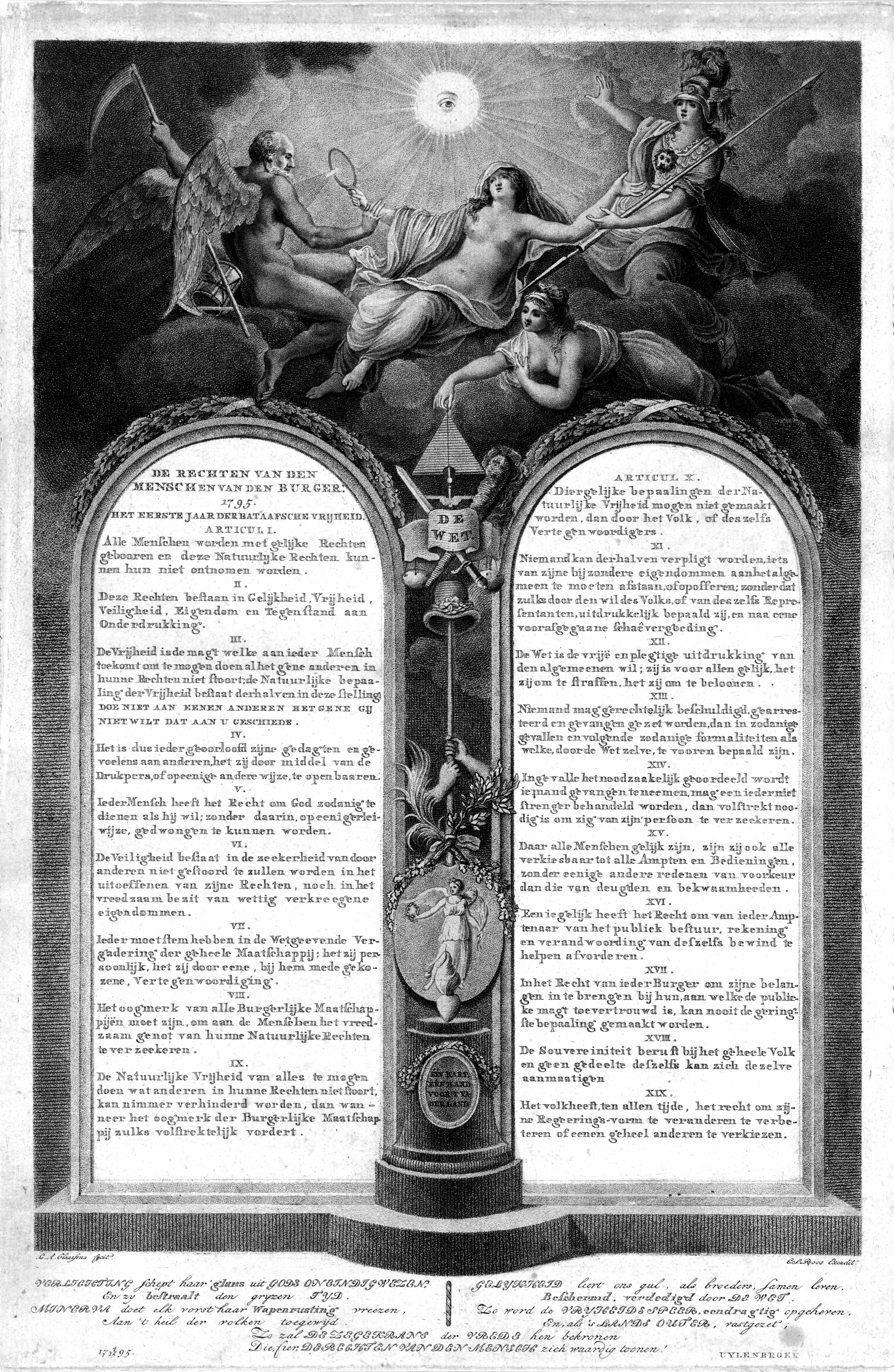
Rights of Man and of Citizens, proclaimed on 31 januari 1795 at The Hague

Lambertus Antonius Claessens or Lambert Antoine Claessens (21 November 1763 in Antwerp – 6 October 1834 in Rueil-Malmaison) was a Flemish engraver, print artist, copyist and publisher. He trained initially in Antwerp as a landscape painter and then in London as an engraver with Francesco Bartolozzi. He was active in Amsterdam and Paris. He is known for his reproductive prints mainly of portraits and old master paintings.

== Life ==
Lambertus Antonius Claessens was born in Antwerp where he first trained as a landscape painter at the local Academy. He became interested in printmaking and travelled to London where he was a pupil of Francesco Bartolozzi from 1792 to 1794.

In 1795 he moved to Amsterdam where he resided and remained active until about 1808. He collaborated on some projects with the engraver Ludwig Gottlieb Portman including on a series of portraits of the leaders of the French Revolution. Jan Willem Caspari was his pupil. He married in Amsterdam the widow of the French miniature painter A. J. Pelletier. His wife was also active as a printmaker.

Claessens later moved to Paris where he remained active for the rest of his life. The Dutch engraver Joachim Jan Oortman was his pupil in Paris.

== Work ==
Lambertus Antonius Claessens was mainly active as a reproductive engraver. He produced many reproductions of the great Dutch, Flemish, French and Italian masters.

He also worked on projects such as a series of portraits of the leaders of the French Revolution which were made after portraits created by other artists. He designed and engraved illustrations for various publications and a print representing Rights of Man and of Citizens proclaimed on 31 januari 1795 at The Hague.
