= Hermanus Numan =

Dutch painter

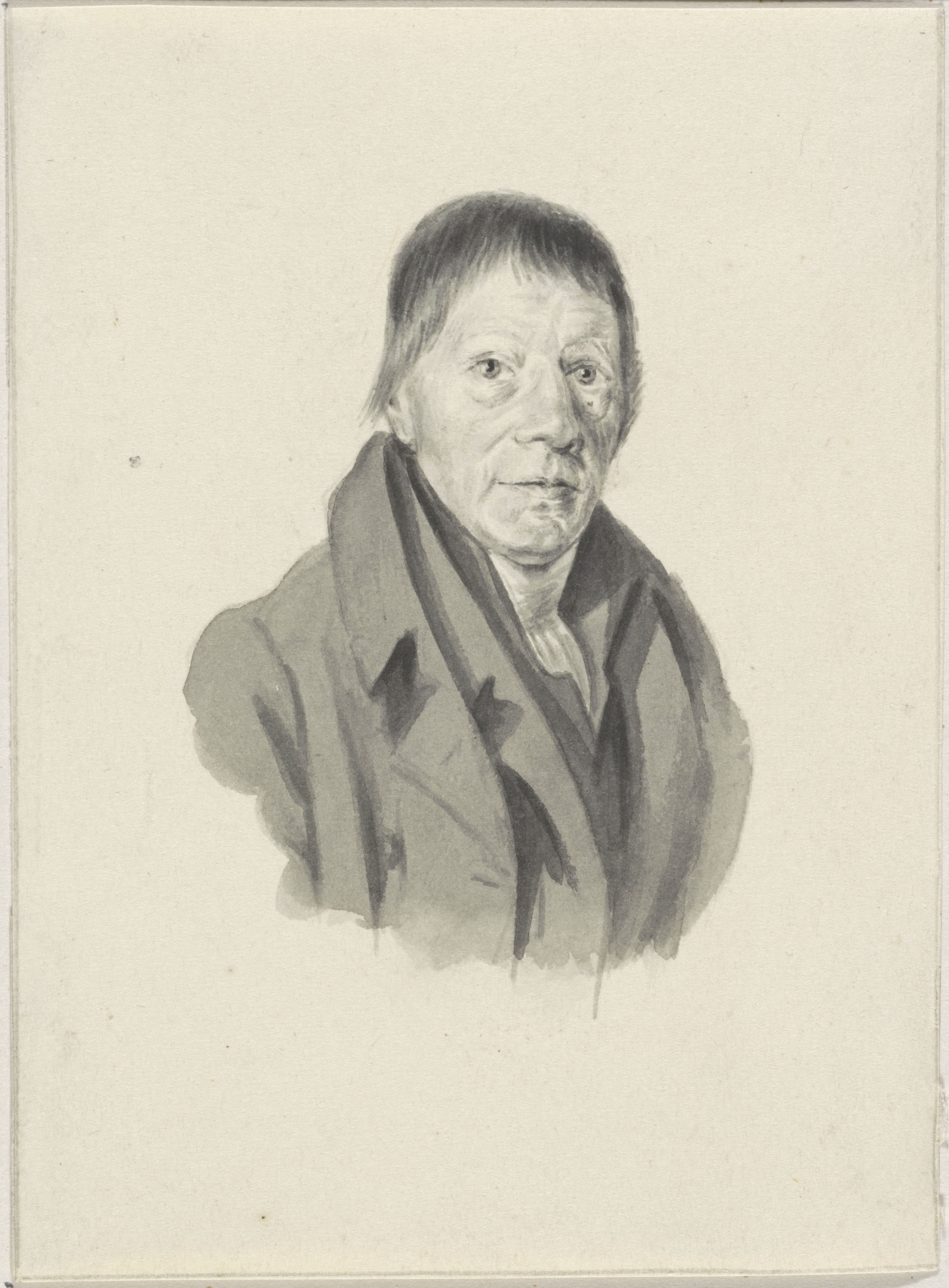
Hermanus Numan

Hermanus Numan (1744 – 9 March 1820) was a Dutch painter, draftsman, pastellist, etcher, engraver, watercolorist, set painter, decorator (interiors), art theorist, and publisher.

Numan was born in Ezinge, Winsum. Between 1759 and 1762 he worked with his father in a lacquerware factory in Groningen. From 1762 to 1766 he apprenticed with Jan Augustini and worked alongside Egbert van Drielst in Haarlem producing decorative wallpaper. He then returned to Groningen and worked for a while as a portraitist. In 1768 he traveled to Paris where he studied engraving.

Numan moved to Amsterdam, where he continued to work and study for the rest of his life. In 1771 he studied under Jurriaan Andriessen at the Stadstekenacademie (City Drawing School). Numan married Anna Maria van Sterkenburg, and later became a member of the Felix Meritis artist community. His subjects were primarily landscapes, genre art, and portraits. He is also known as a copyist, not only through his engravings, but also copies of paintings in Amsterdam collections.

In 1808 he became fourth class member of the Royal Institute of the Netherlands.

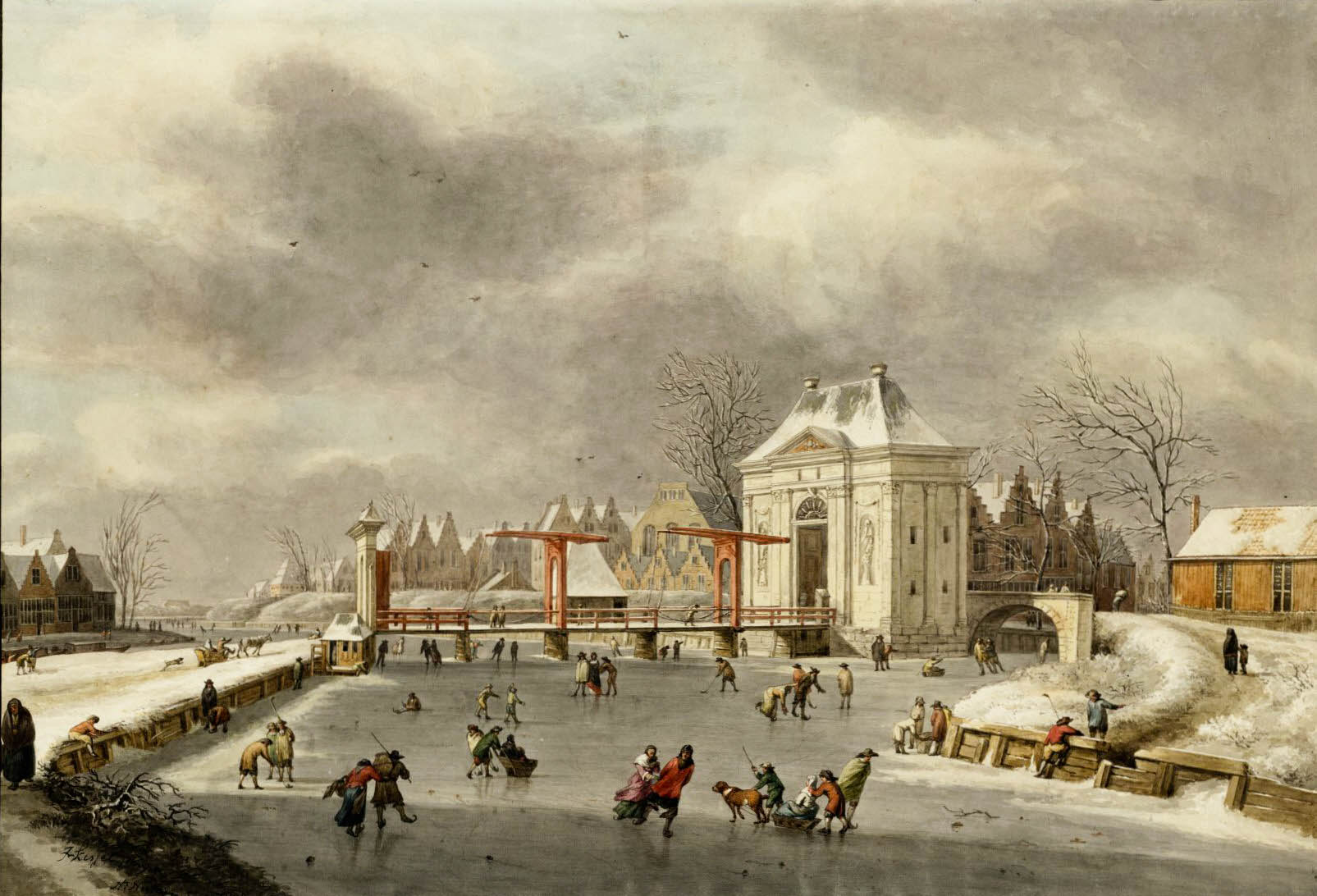
The ice in the moat outside the Heiligeweg Gate by Hermanus Numan, Rijksmuseum, 1808

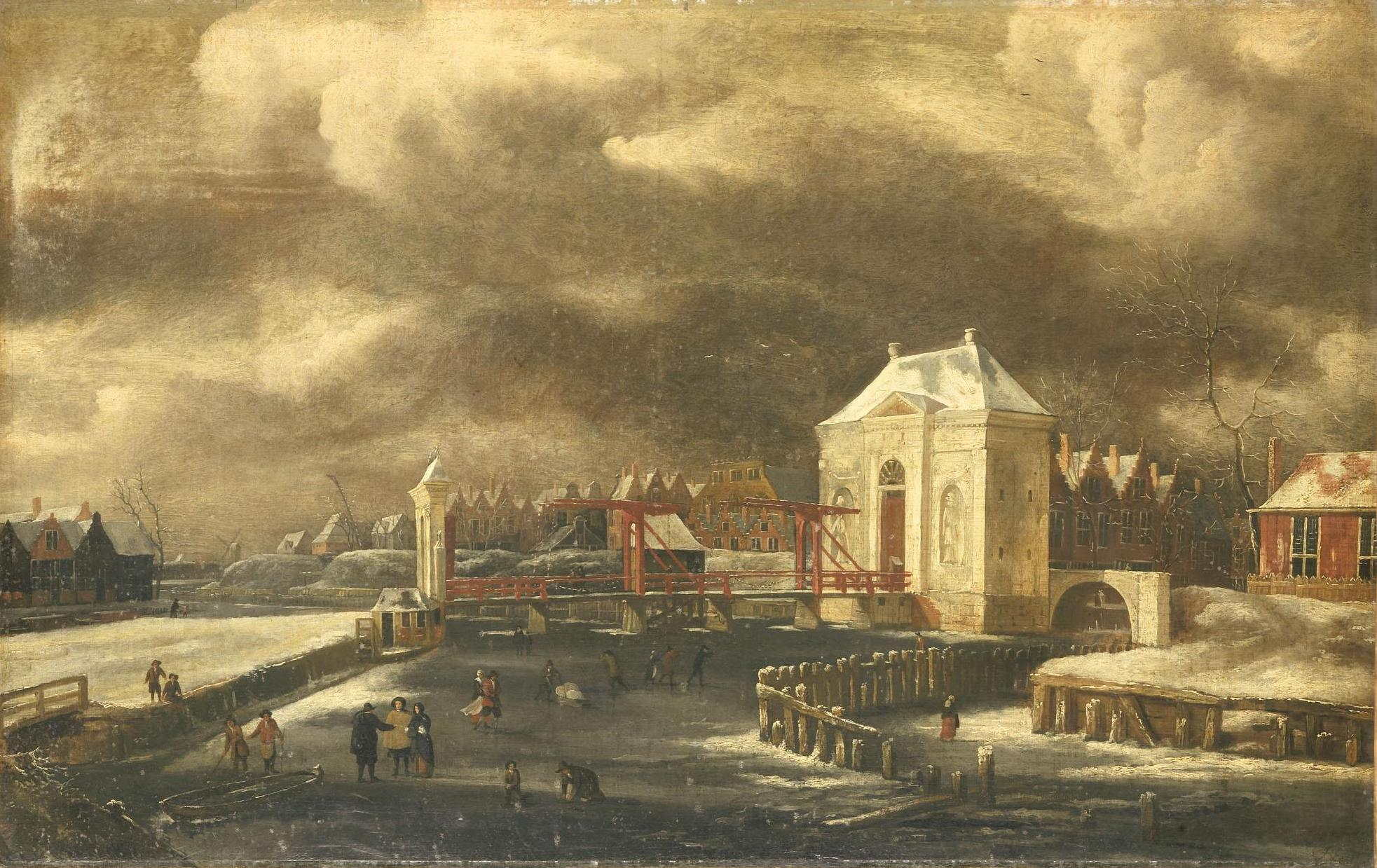
Original painting by Jan van Kessel, Rijksmuseum, 1660–80

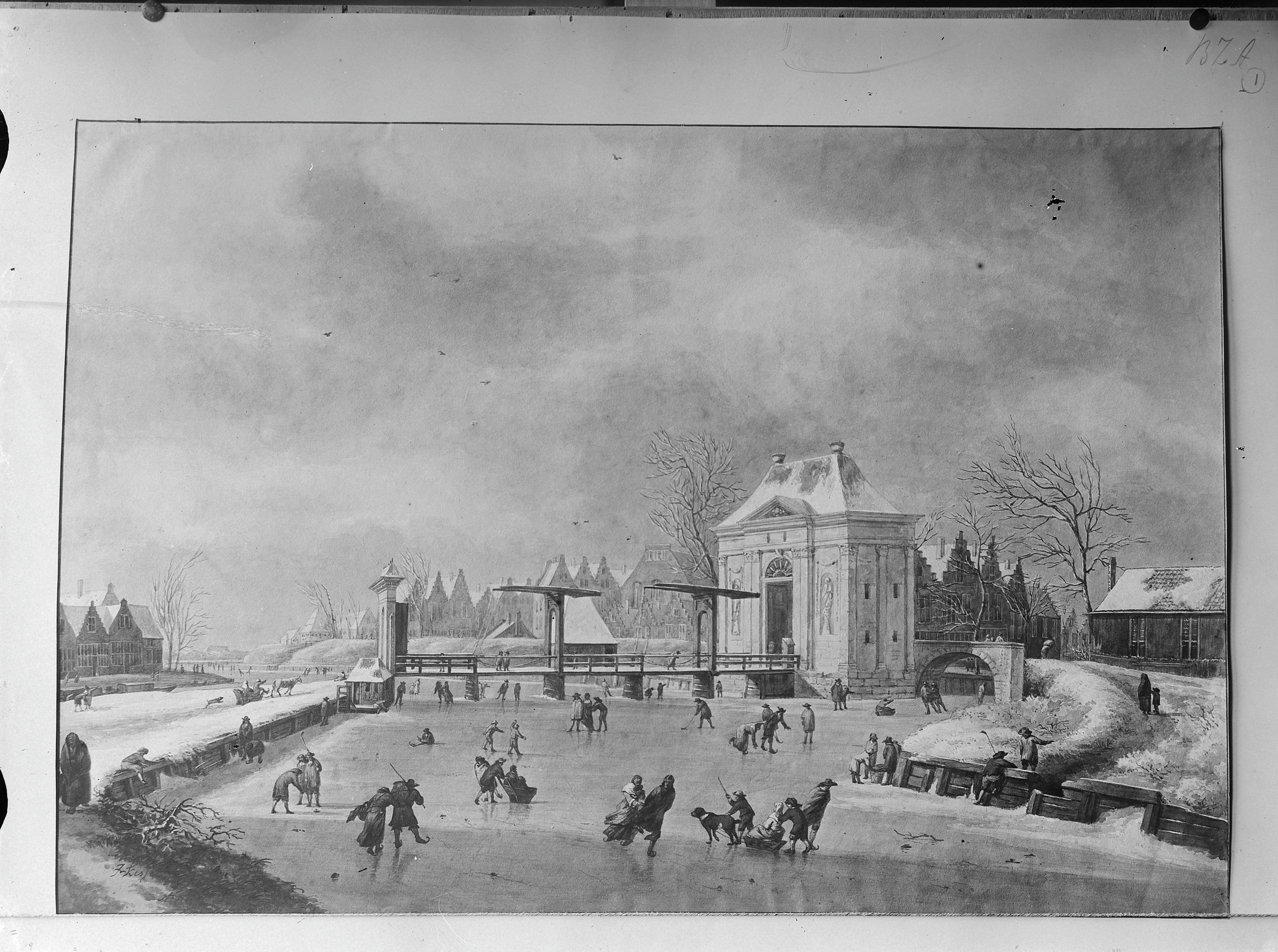
Drawing in 1808 by Numan in Amsterdam archives
