= Jan Bulthuis =

Dutch painter and draftsman

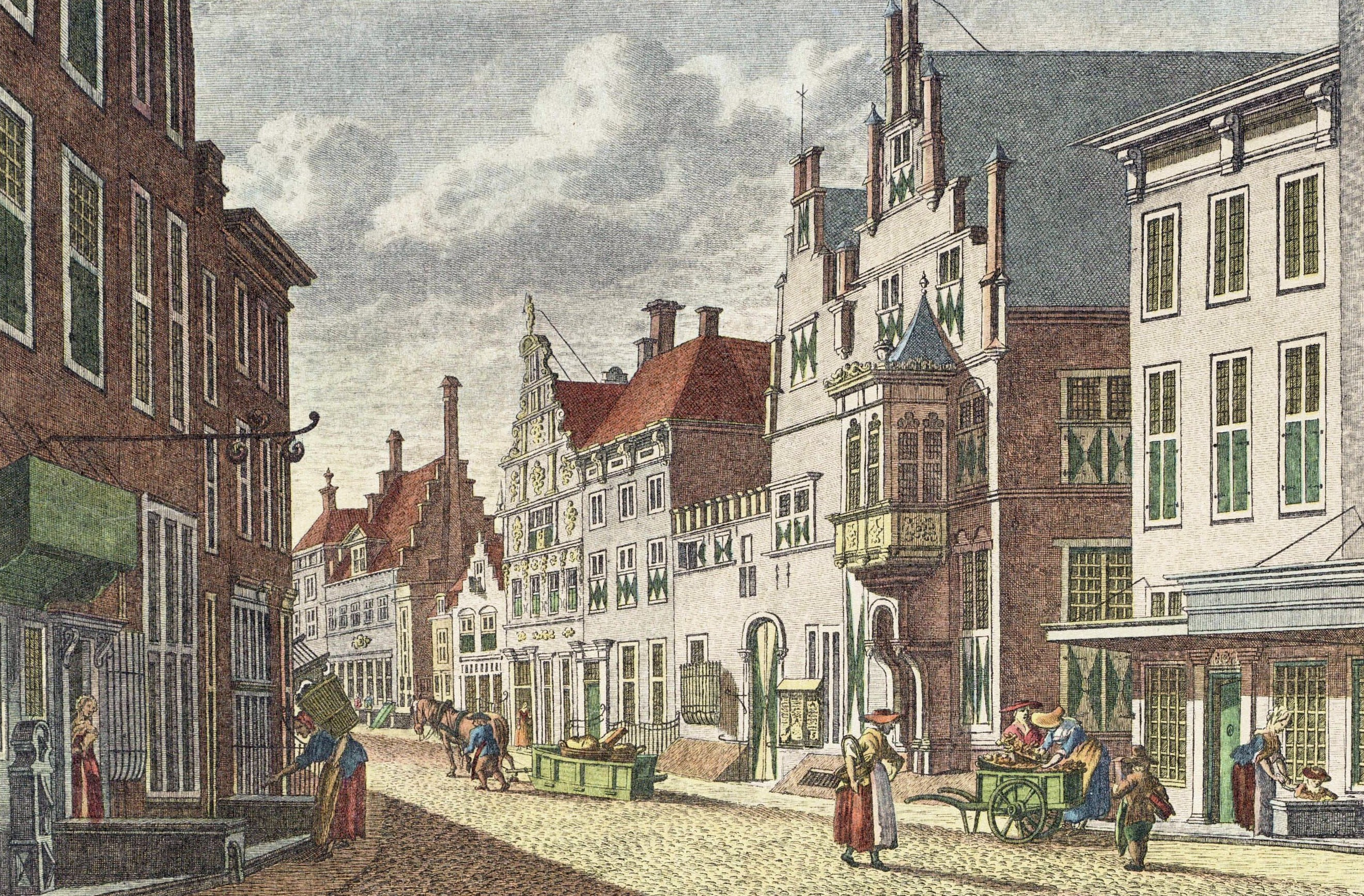
West-Indisch Huis in Middelburg by Jan Bulthuis, Westfries Museum

Jan Bulthuis (30 October 1750 – 29 May 1801) was a Dutch draftsman and painter.

Bulthuis was born in Groningen. He was the son of Claas Bulthuis and Weasley Ten Huising. As a painter he was trained by Jurriaan Andriessen and as a draftsman by Johannes Wieringa. Initially he painted landscapes but later began to concentrate on the signs of urban and rural sites. He was employed in his hometown of Groningen and from 1780 in Amsterdam. In 1785 he enrolled at the Stadstekenacademie (City Drawing School) where he won a gold medal. He made a series of drawings for the description of the Zaanlandsche villages of Adriaan Loosjes, which was issued. In 1794 his drawings were also included in the published 1968 Frisian "Vaderlandsche faces".

Bulthuis died on 29 May 1801 in Amsterdam at the age of 50.
