= Hendrik de Meijer =

Dutch painter

Hendrik Meijer (1744–1793) was an 18th-century painter from the Dutch Republic.

== Biography ==
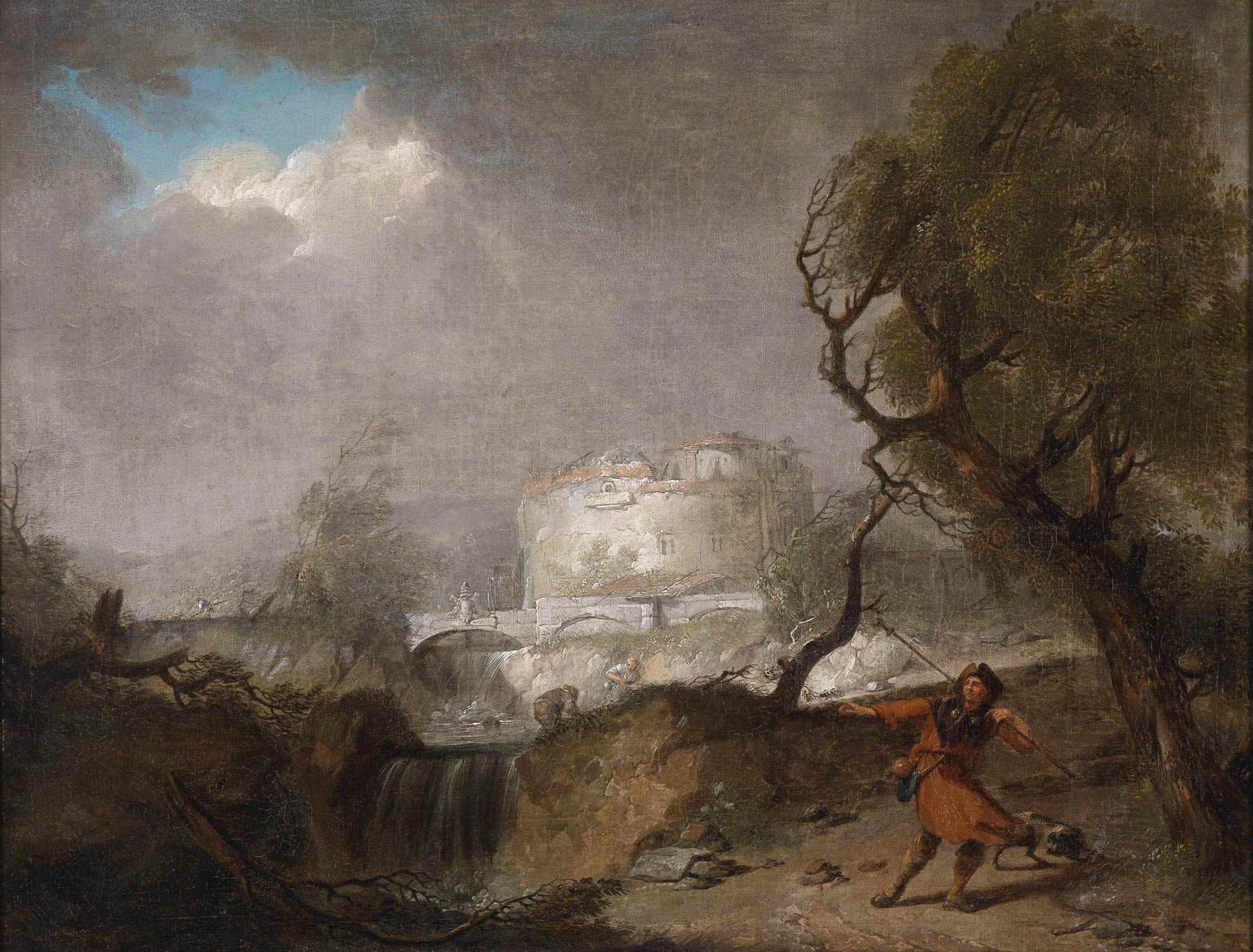
Painting by Hendrik Meijer

Meijer was born in Amsterdam in 1744, though Abraham Jacob van der Aa gave his date of birth as 1737. According to the RKD he was first a member of the Stadstekenacademie in Amsterdam until 1768. He moved to Haarlem and started a wallpaper factory there in 1764-1769. He became a director of the Stadstekenacademie in Haarlem in 1769. His pupils were Cornelis Apostool, Jos van den Berg, Egbert van Drielst, Geerlig Grijpmoed, Dirk Jan van der Laan, Leendert Overbeek, and Barend Hendrik Thier. In 1775 he travelled to London with fellow academy director Wybrand Hendriks. He died in London.

He is not to be confused with the earlier landscape painter Hendrick de Meijer of Rotterdam.
