= Hendrick de Meijer =

Dutch Golden Age landscape painter

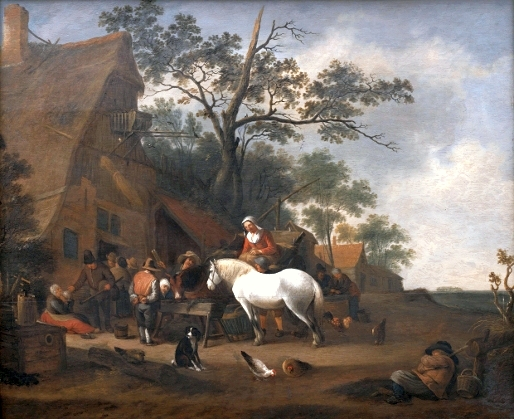
Scene at an inn

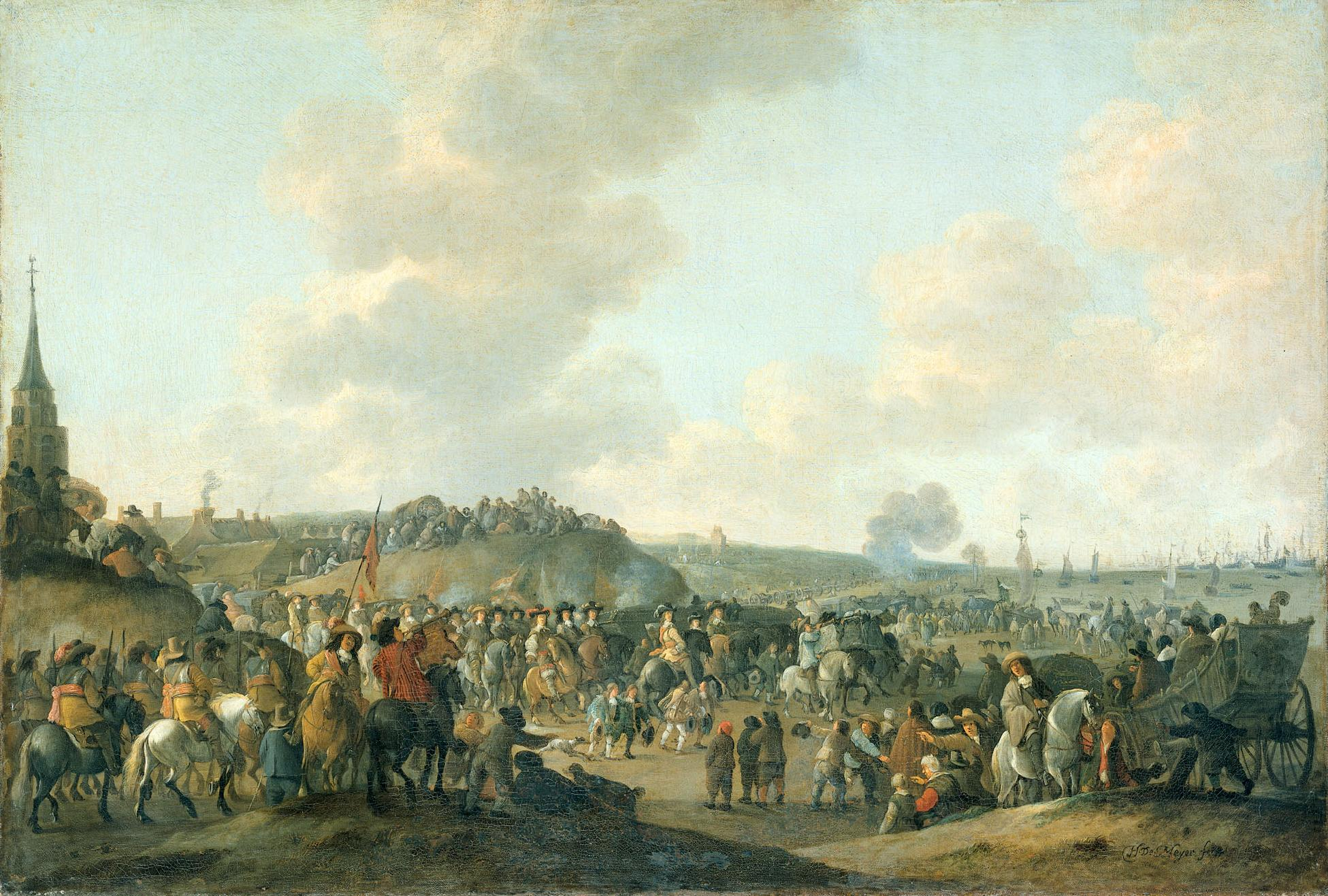
The departure of Charles II of England from Scheveningen

Hendrick de Meijer (1620–1689) was a Dutch Golden Age landscape painter.

== Biography ==
He was born in Rotterdam and is considered by the RKD to be a landscape painter of the "Albert Cuyp school". He is not to be confused with the later landscape painter Hendrik de Meijer who traveled to England. He is known for dated works and is mentioned in Rotterdam archives from 1640 to 1689, but after that nothing more is known of him.
