= Christiaan Andriessen =

Dutch painter

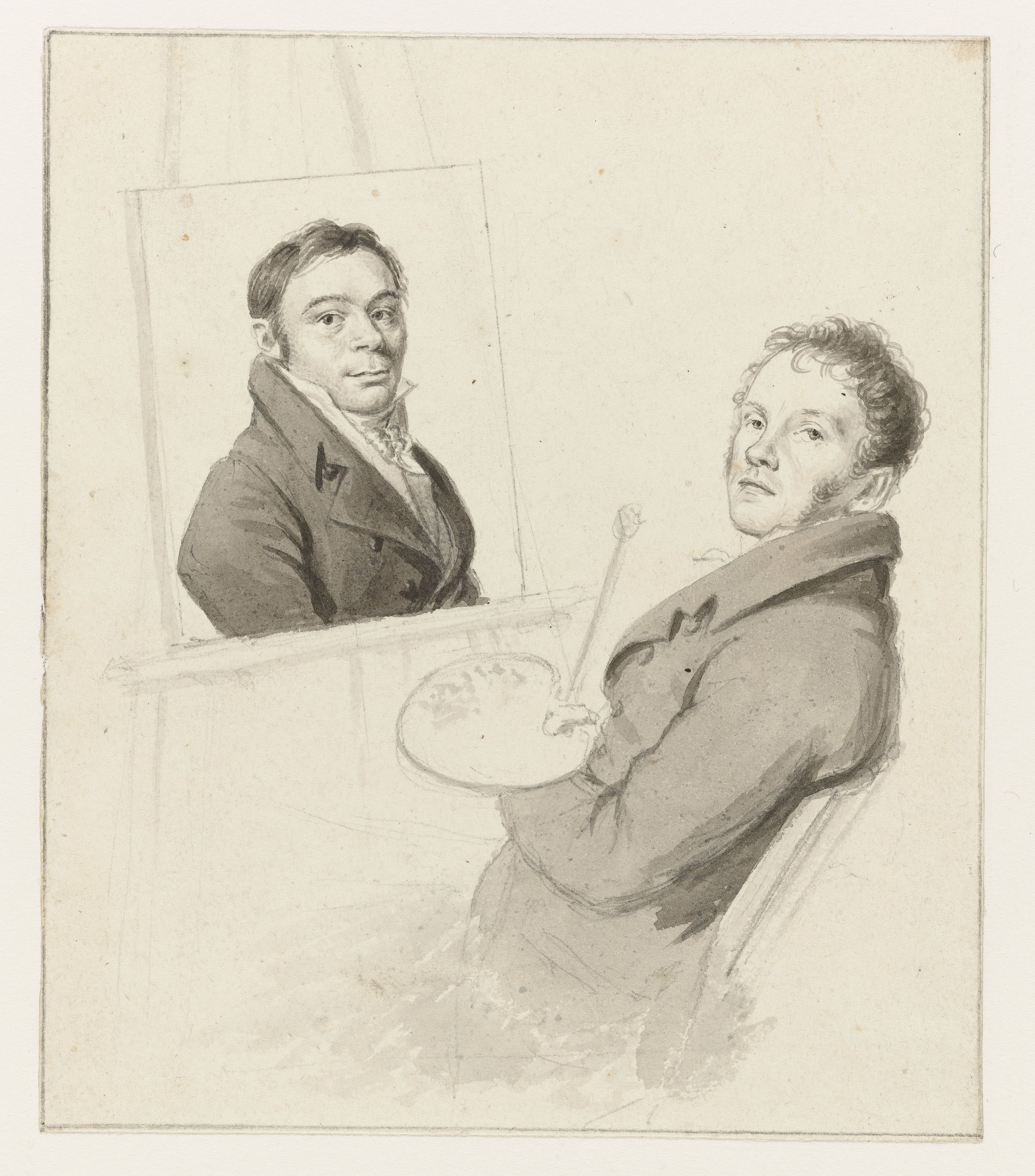
Portrait of Christiaan Andriessen painting a portrait of Izaäk Riewert Schmidt (by Hendrik Willem Caspa

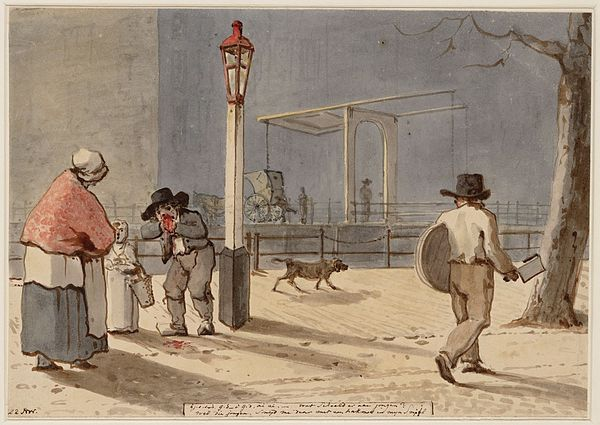
A boy attacked on the street by a butcher's boy with a knife, page from 1805 from the diary of Andriessen, now kept at the city archive of Amsterdam.

Christiaan Andriessen, who was born at Amsterdam in 1775, was the son and student of Jurriaan, and became a good painter of history, genre subjects, landscapes, views of towns, and occasionally portraits. Among his works may be mentioned a Panorama of Amsterdam. He died in 1846.
