= Cornelis Apostool =

Dutch artist, diplomat and museum director

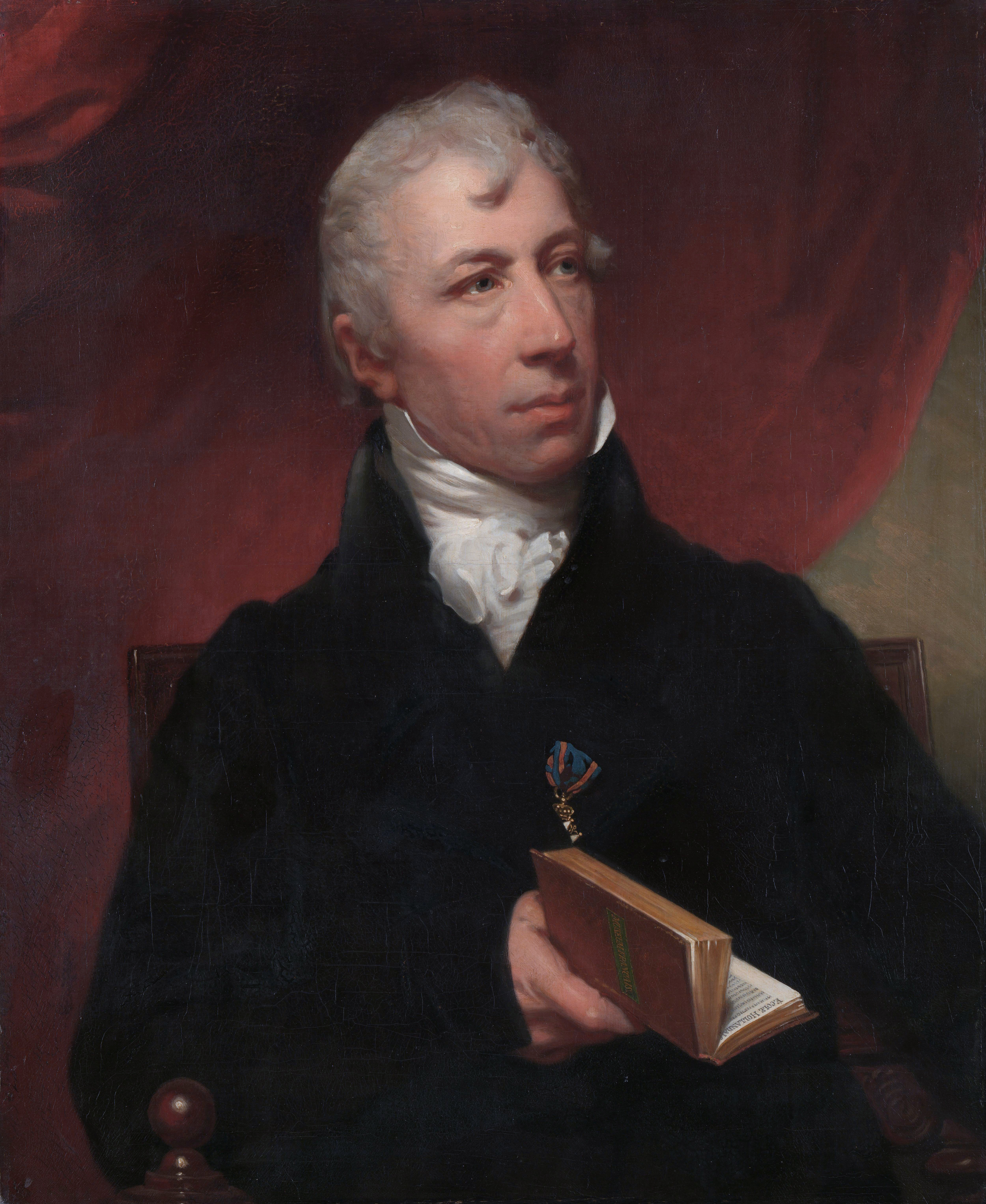
- Portrait of Cornelis Apostool (ca. 1816) by Charles Howard Hodges
- Born: Cornelis Apostool; 6 August 1762; Amsterdam, Dutch Republic
- Died: 10 February 1844 (aged 81); Amsterdam, Netherlands
- Education: Hendrik Meijer
- Known for: Painting, drawing, engraving

Cornelis Apostool (Dutch pronunciation: [kɔrˈneːlɪs aːpɔsˈtoːl]; 6 August 1762 – 10 February 1844) was a Dutch artist, diplomat, and museum director.

== Biography ==
Cornelis Apostool was born on 6 August 1762 in Amsterdam in the Dutch Republic. His father was Jan Apostool, a Mennonite and a merchant in animal skins and cocoa beans, and his mother was Cornelia de Witte. He was the eleventh of twelve children, six of whom died at a young age.

Apostool studied foreign languages with a French teacher in Delft. He then did an apprenticeship with a salesman in silver and gold in Rotterdam. From 1784 to 1786, he was a pupil of landscape painter Hendrik Meijer at the art academy back in Amsterdam. In 1786, Meijer and Apostool went to England, where Apostool stayed and lived to work as an engraver of aquatints.

He became the Commissary-general of Commerce in London around 1793. After the Batavian Revolution, he negotiated the exchange of prisoners of war for the Batavian Republic in London. In 1796, he returned to his native country.

During the French occupation from 1798 to 1802, Apostool worked as an illustrator for the Agency of Interior Police and Water Management and later the Council of Interior Affaires.

In 1802, Apostool returned to his position as Commissary-general of Commerce in London, and he negotiated the release of Batavian ships. In 1806, he was appointed Government Secretary in the Dutch East Indies. But before he even arrived there, Louis Bonaparte became King of Holland and Apostool returned. In 1807, he briefly was a diplomat in the Kingdom of Naples.

In 1808, Apostool was appointed director of the Royal Museum in Amsterdam, which office he held until his death. In 1810, he was elected a member of the Royal Institute of the Netherlands. He died on 10 February 1844 at the age of 81 in Amsterdam.

== Works ==
Some older biographies refer to Apostool as a dilettante, but in a 2012 biography is claimed that he was more than a dilettante, because he made "artistically high quality aquatints of paintings and drawings of others".

He engraved a portrait of Lavinia Fenton, afterwards Duchess of Bolton, after Hogarth, as well as landscapes for the Beauties of the Dutch School, Select Views in the South of France, Travels through the Maritime Alps, and Daniell's Views of Hindostan.
