= Anthonie Andriessen =

Dutch painter

Anthonie Andriessen (1747–1813) was a Dutch artist. He worked with his brother Jurriaan to paint wallpapers for private houses.
