= Jacques Kuyper =

Dutch painter (1761–1808)

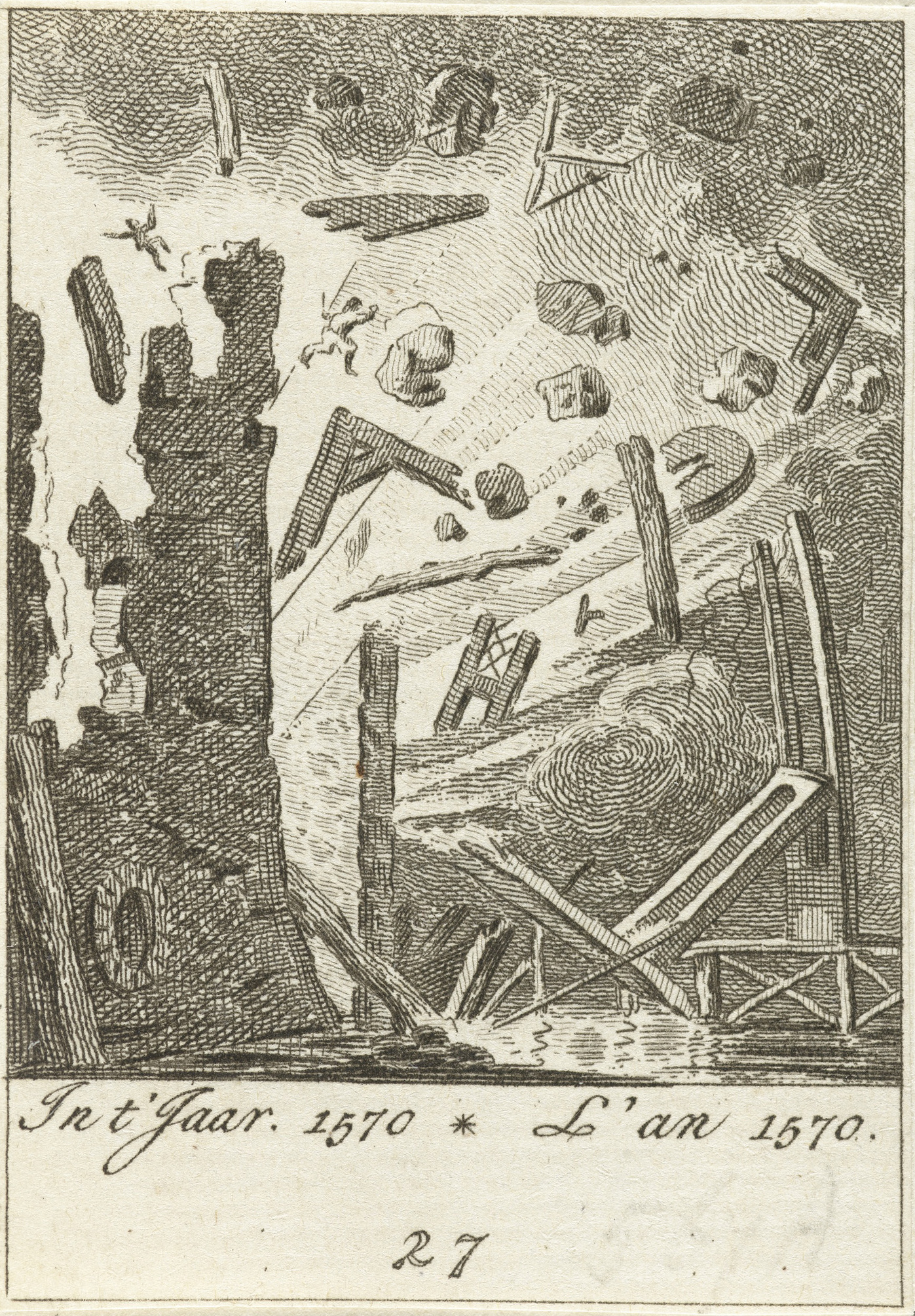
Explosion of Loevestein, Netherlands by Jacques Kuyper, Rijksmuseum, between 1775-1779

Jacques Kuyper (29 June 1761 – 1 June 1808) was a Dutch printmaker, painter, draftsman, watercolourist, etcher, musician, and composer.

Kuyper was born in Amsterdam. He primarily painted depictions of buildings and landscapes. Starting in 1776 he studied under Jurriaan Andriessen at the Stadstekenacademie (City Drawing School). In their annual art competitions he won 3rd place in 1781, 2nd in 1782, and 1st place in 1783. He then used the award money to travel and work around Germany where he visited Düsseldorf, the Rhine, and Mannheim, before ultimately returning to Amsterdam. In 1801 he was appointed secretary-director at Stadstekenacademie. Kuyper became a member of the Felix Meritis artist community. He was also a founding member of the Royal Netherlands Academy of Arts and Sciences in 1808.
