= Reinier Vinkeles =

Dutch painter (1741–1816)

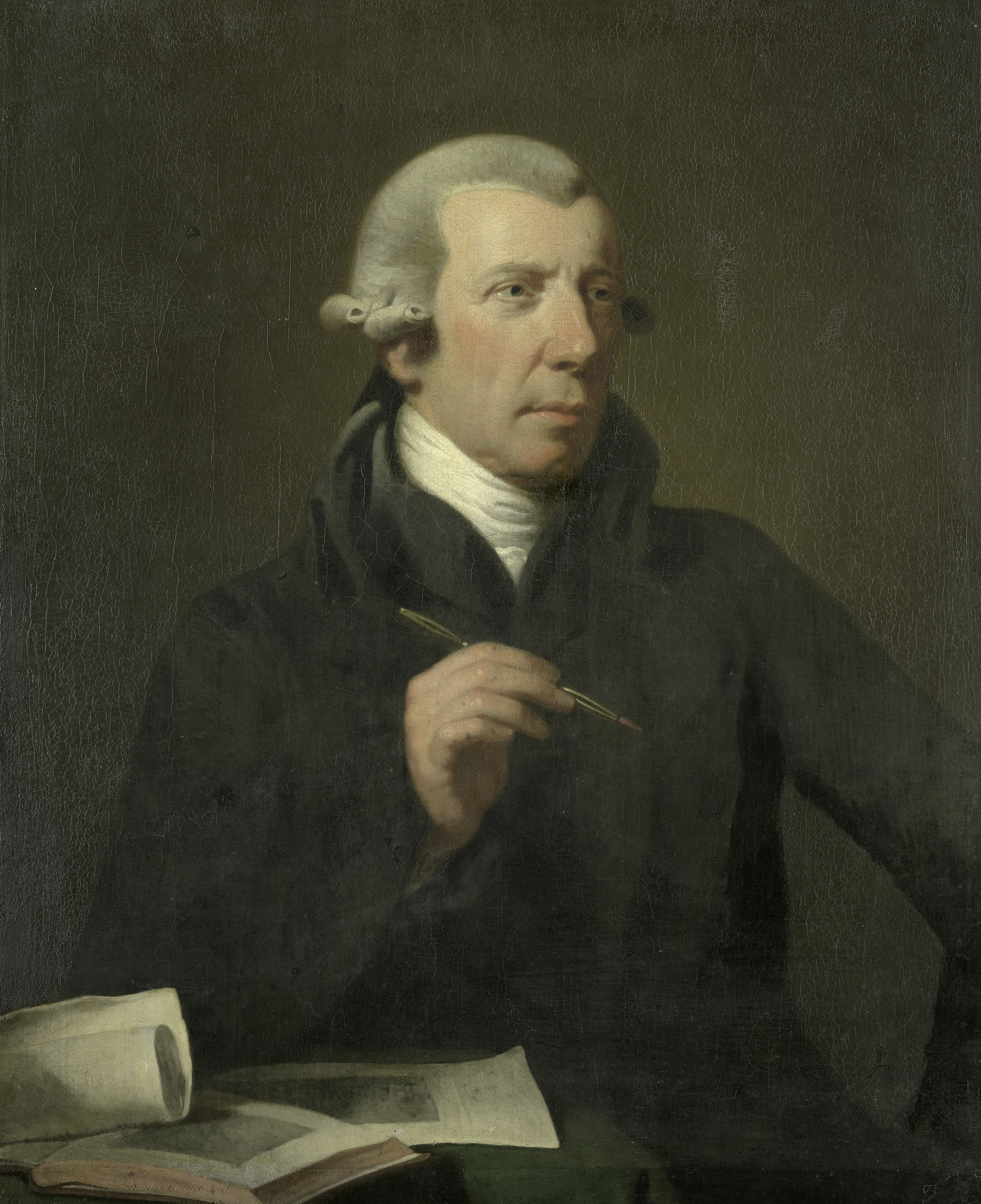
Portrait by Charles Howard Hodges

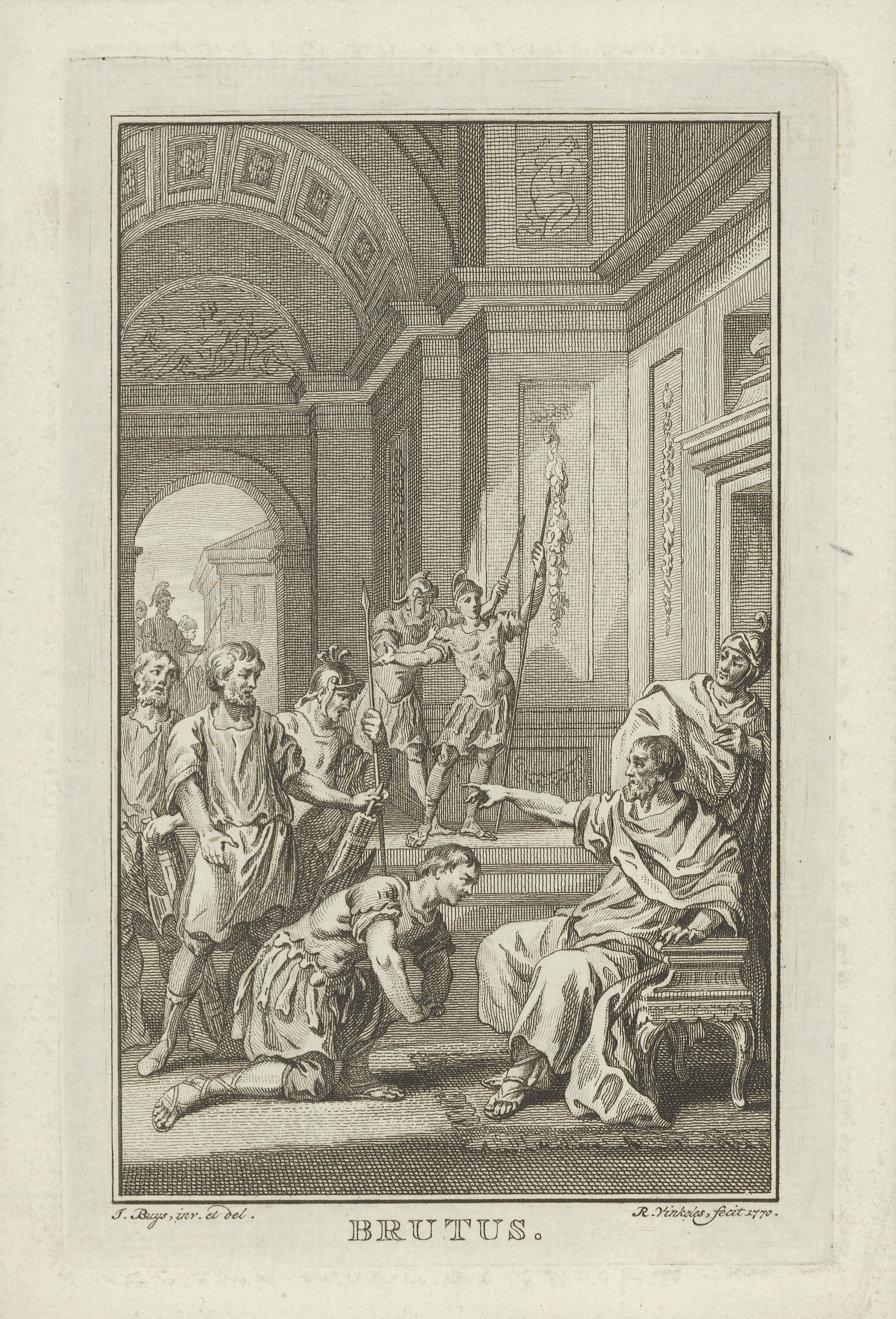
Print for the tragedy Brutus. Made by Reinier Vinkeles

Reinier Vinkeles (1741–1816) was an 18th-century painter and engraver from the Northern Netherlands (Dutch Republic), who was the teacher of several talented artists.

== Biography ==
Vinkeles was born in 1741, in Amsterdam. He studied for some ten years with Jan Punt and joined the Amsterdam Stadstekenacademie (City Drawing School) in 1762.

In 1765 he travelled to Brabant with Jurriaan Andriessen and Izaäk Schmidt. In 1770 he left for Paris, where he studied for a year with Jacques-Philippe Le Bas and also met the Dutch artists Hermanus Numan and Izaak Jansz de Wit (1744-1809).

When he returned to Amsterdam he worked making prints for book illustrations, including portraits, topographical and architectural prints, copies after Dutch masters, and theatre sets. He became a director of the Stadstekenacademie]and was a member of the artist's club Pax Artium Nutrix. He became the teacher of Jacob Ernst Marcus, Jacobus Millies, his son Abraham Vinkeles, his brother Harmanus Vinkeles (1745-1804), his son Johannes Vinkeles, and Daniël Vrijdag.

Vinkeles died in 1816, in Amsterdam.

== Gallery ==
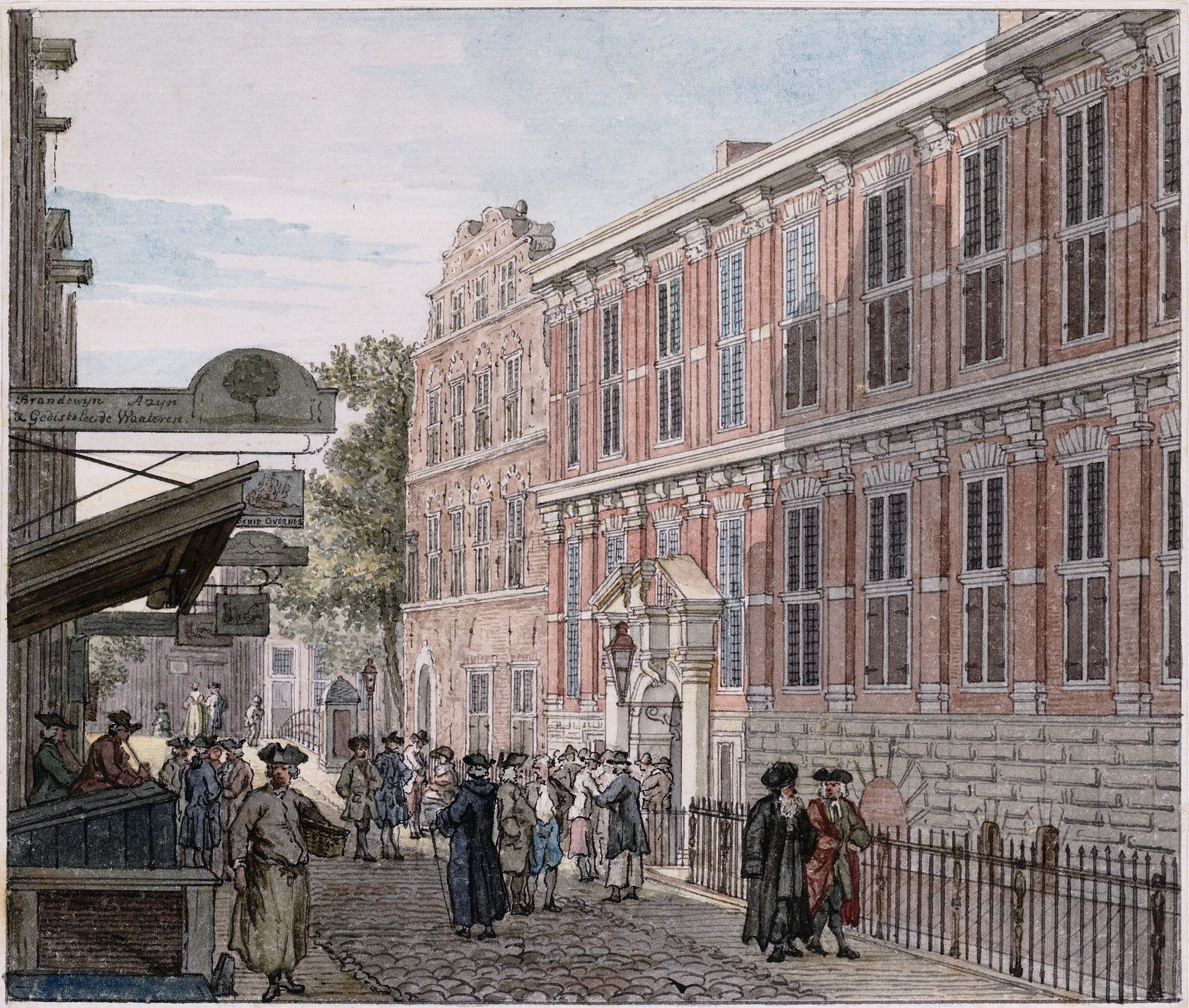
Oost-Indisch Huis, 1768

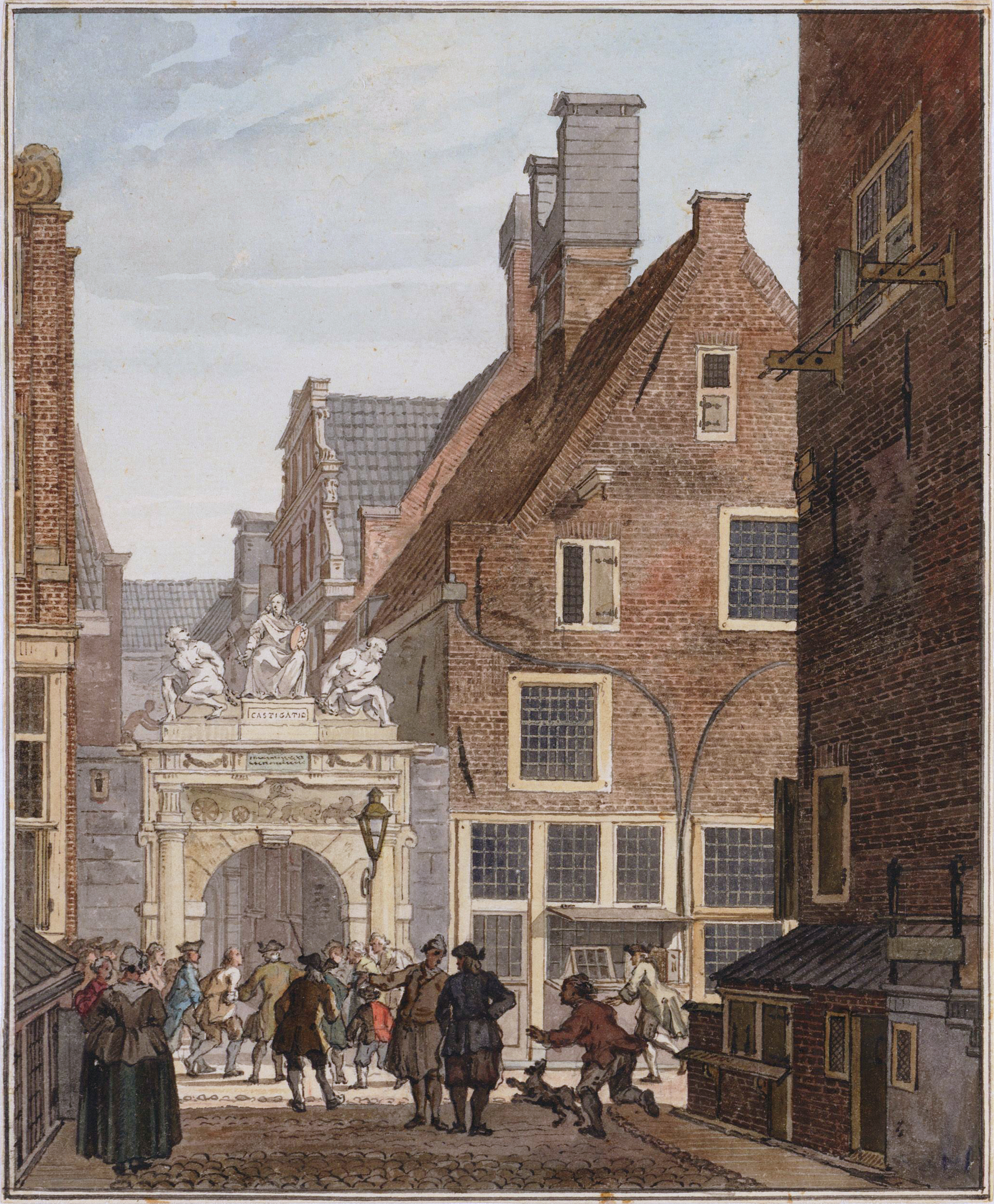
The Rasphuis was a prison and poorhouse in one. Note the prisoner being brought in with handcuffs.

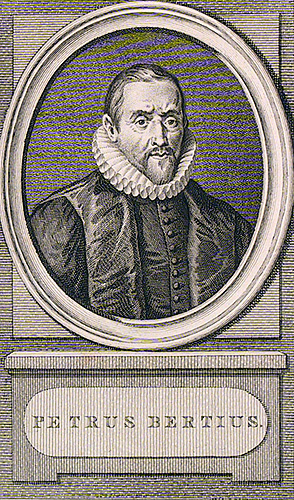
Petrus Bertius, 1787
