= Felix Meritis =

Dutch intellectual society

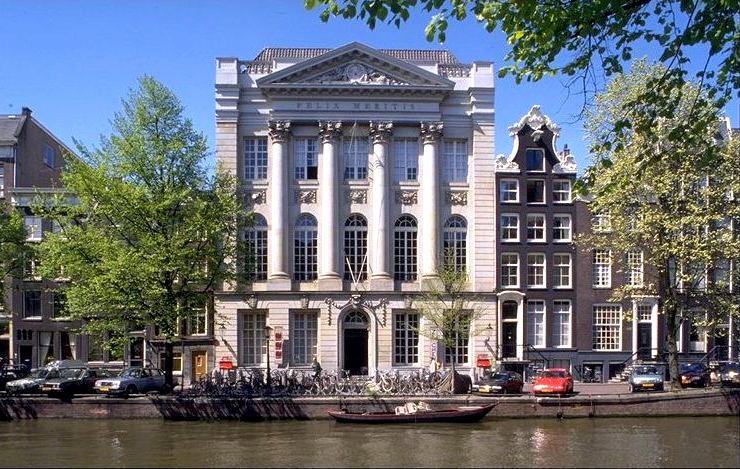
- Building on the Keizersgracht in Amsterdam
- Formation: 1776
- Coordinates: 52°22′12″N 4°53′03″E

Felix Meritis ('Happy through Merit') is the name of an intellectual society in Amsterdam, but subsequently used for their building on the Keizersgracht.

== History ==
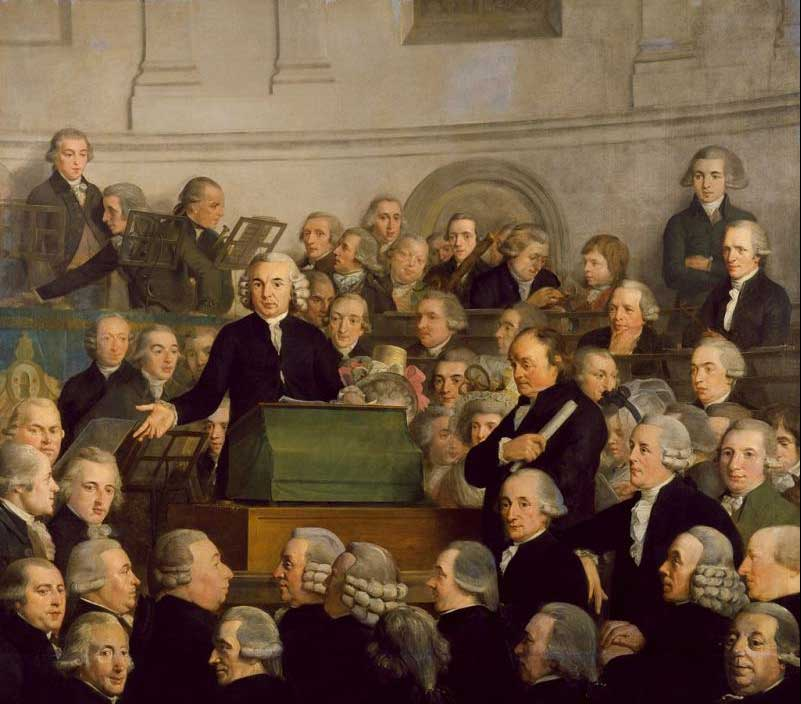
The inauguration of the building on 31 October 1788, painted by Adriaan de Lelie

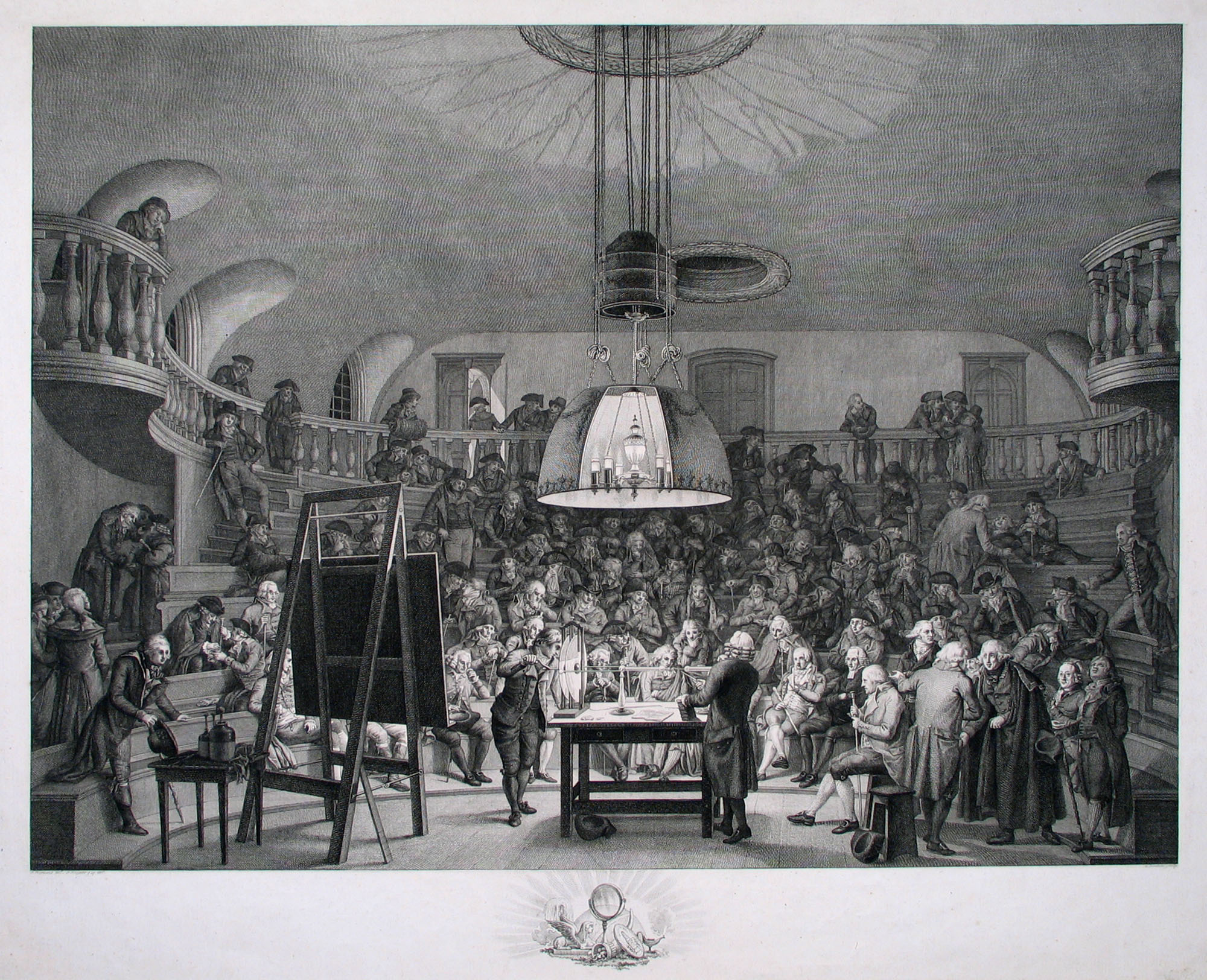
The 'Hall of Physics' during an electricity demonstration with leiden jars and an electriseermachine, engraved by Reinier Vinkeles in 1794 after a drawing by Jacques Kuyper and Pieter Barbiers in 1791.

It was built according to a winning design by the architect Jacob Otten Husly for the new society called Felix Meritis established in 1776 for Music, Drawing, Physics, Commerce and Literature in the modern neo-classical style. Otten Husly had won a similar design contest for the city hall of Groningen in the previous year. The building itself was meant to exemplify the Enlightenment ideals the society stood for. The classical temple façade with its colossal Corinthian pilasters and pediment represent the society's five departments with five sculptures representing the visual arts and architecture, literature, trade, natural sciences and music. The interior includes original 18th-century features such as the central staircase, the oval concert hall (renowned for its acoustics) and the domed roof - underneath which there used to be an astronomical observatory.

On 31 October 1788 the building of the same name opened its doors. The society focused on the promotion of arts and sciences in a broader sense than the artists collectives popular at the time. Otten Husly was himself a board member of the Amsterdam city drawing academy Stadstekenacademie, that had close contacts with the Oeconomischen Tak van de Hollandsche Maatschappij der Wetenschappen ('economics branch of the Hollandsche Maatschappij der Wetenschappen', which met in the Trippenhuis). The society was abolished in 1888.

Felix Meritis’ oval concert hall was the main music hall in Amsterdam until late into the 19th century and enjoyed a great international reputation. Many famous musicians performed there, including Robert and Clara Schumann, Camille Saint-Saëns, Johannes Brahms and Julius Röntgen. The orchestra of Felix Meritis was regarded as the best of the Netherlands and accompanied many Dutch premieres, directed by conductors such as Johannes Bernardus van Bree. Thus, Beethoven’s Ninth Symphony and Berlioz’s Symphonie fantastique had their Dutch premiere in the concert hall of Felix Meritis. The small hall of the Concertgebouw is a replica of this concert hall.

== Twentieth century ==
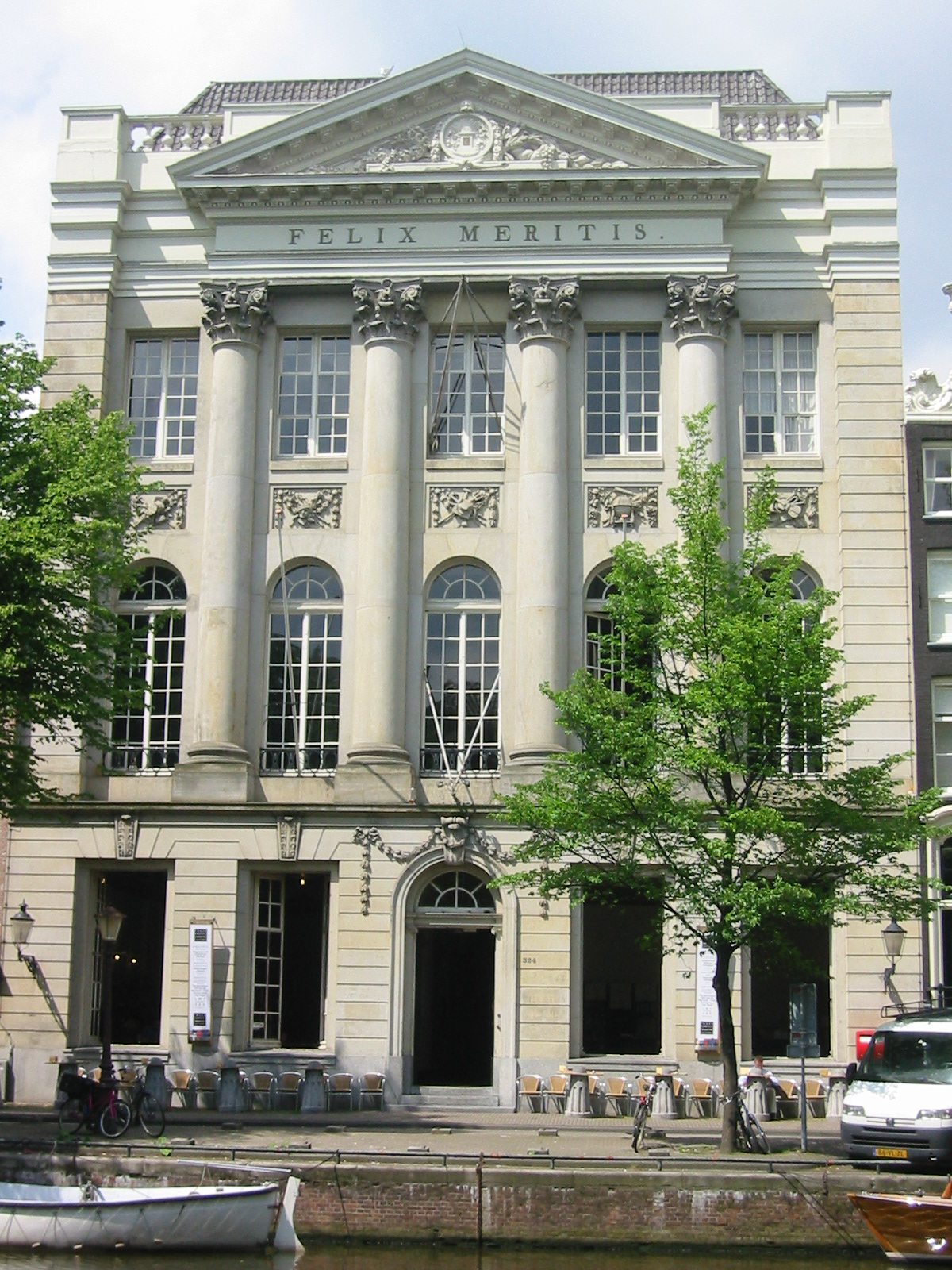
Facade

When the old Felix Meritis society was dissolved in 1888, the printing company Holdert & Co., which became one of Amsterdam's largest printing companies, moved into the building. In 1932 part of the building was destroyed in a fire. After the Second World War the Communist Party of the Netherlands set up its headquarters in the building. From 1947 until 1981 its newspaper De Waarheid ('The Truth') rolled from the presses. In the 1950s, Felix Meritis became the symbol of communism in the Netherlands. This image became especially embedded in the collective memory when the building was stormed on 4 November 1956, in response to the Soviet invasion of Hungary and its endorsement by the Dutch communist party. However, in the late sixties, Felix Meritis became a cradle of evenings for alternative youth, which were named Provadya. In 1969 the Shaffy Theatre opened, which gained a reputation as a stopping place for the Dutch avant-garde, including Ramses Shaffy, Baal, Neerlands Hoop, Independent Theatre and Hauser Orkater.

== Centre for art, culture and science ==
In 1988, one hundred years after the old society was dissolved, The Felix Meritis foundation was re-established in the building as a European center for art, culture and science. Felix Meritis is an independent international meeting place and serves as director of the European public debate, cultural processes and international projects and exchanges. Felix Meritis presents itself as a knowledge institution and platform for European cultural dialogue and cultural-political issues. The motto of Felix Meritis is Connecting Cultures. In collaboration with partners from home and abroad Felix Meritis initiates projects such as A Soul for Europe, Amsterdam Forum, The People Network, Gulliver Connect, Amsterdam Summer University, Dare2Connect, The European House for Culture (Brussels), Night of Philosophy, Café Europe, The Globalisation Lecture Foundation, and Kuhnya.

=== Felix in de Steigers ===
In November 2014, the management company Amerborgh, owned by Alex Mulder, purchased Felix Meritis from the city of Amsterdam. Amerborgh started renovating the building in 2017. Between 2015 and 2016 the building housed the temporary project “Felix in de Steigers,” providing space for art, theatre and several experimental cultural programs while construction was under way.

== Canon of Amsterdam ==
- Felix Meritis is window number 23 in the Canon of Amsterdam.

== Literature ==
- Loes Gompes & Merel Ligtelijn, Mirror of Amsterdam - History of Felix Meritis, 2007, Rozenberg Publishers
