= Jurriaan Andriessen (artist) =

Dutch painter

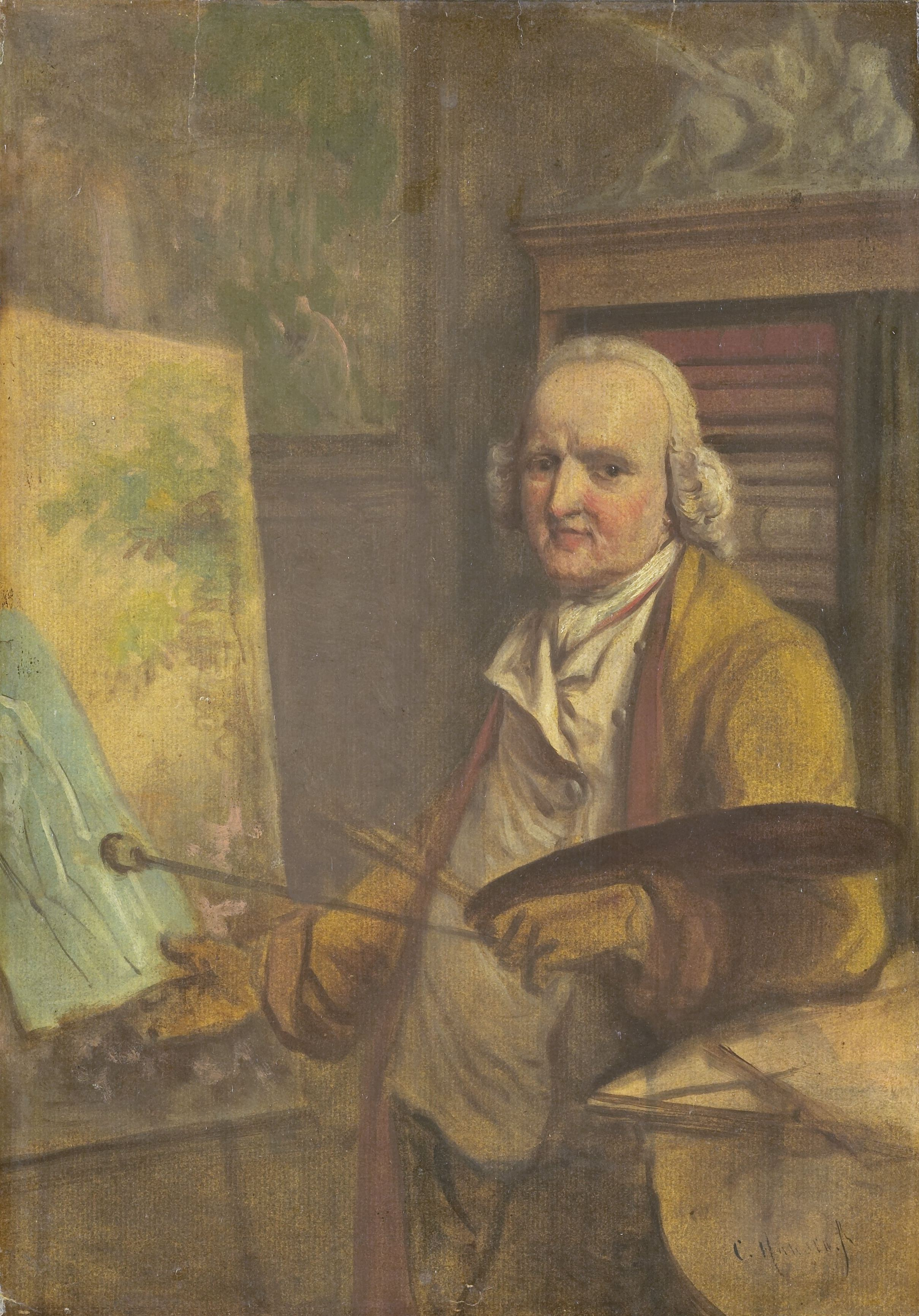
Self-portrait (after 1800); Rijksmuseum Amsterdam

Jurriaan Andriessen (12 July 1742 – 31 July 1819) was a Dutch decorative painter and graphic artist.

== Biography ==
Andriessen was born and died in Amsterdam. His father was from Brandenburg and his mother was from Holstein. He began his art studies at the age of twelve with the decorative painter Anthony Elliger. Four years later, he worked with Jan Maurits Quinkhard. In 1760, he attended the Technical School in Amsterdam and was awarded first prize for his graduation work in 1766. That same year, he was accepted as a member of the Guild of Saint Luke and received a major order for wall decorations at the Huis te Manpad in Heemstede.

He worked with Johannes van Dreght and Reinier Vinkeles. In 1770, he was married. The couple settled in Amsterdam, where he and Izaäk Schmidt opened a workshop for making painted wallpaper. His brother Anthonie, who was a carriage painter, also became involved in the business. Idyllic, mythological landscapes were his most popular product. Toward the end of the eighteenth century, the interest in painted wallpaper declined, so he joined with Hermanus Numan to paint theatrical scenery; most notably for the Schouwburg of Van Campen.

In addition, he was a notable teacher, whose students include Jan Bulthuis, Jacques Kuyper, Gerrit Jan Michaëlis, Jacobus Schoemaker Doyer, Wouter Johannes van Troostwijk and Johann Georg Ziesenis as well as his son, Christiaan.

In 1799, he suffered a stroke that left him partially paralyzed. In all, he produced over 200 wallpaper designs, many of which are in the collection of the Rijksmuseum. Very few are still to be seen in their original locations. The museum also has his diary, meticulously kept over the course of twenty years.

== Selected works ==
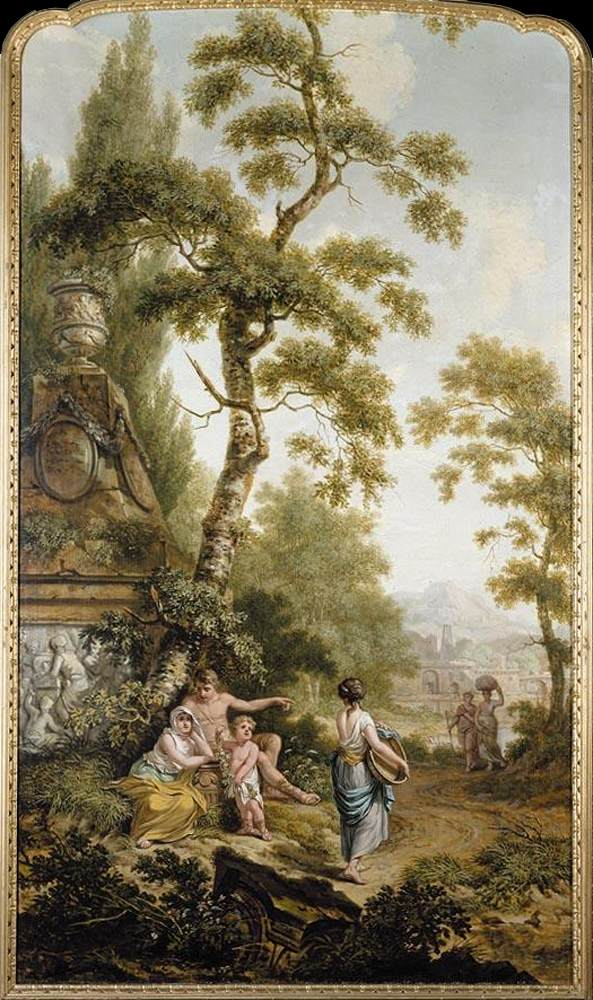
Arcadian landscape

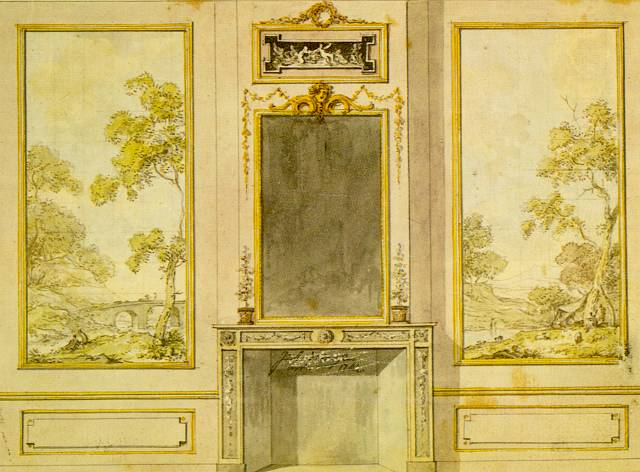
Preliminary sketch for a wallpaper painting

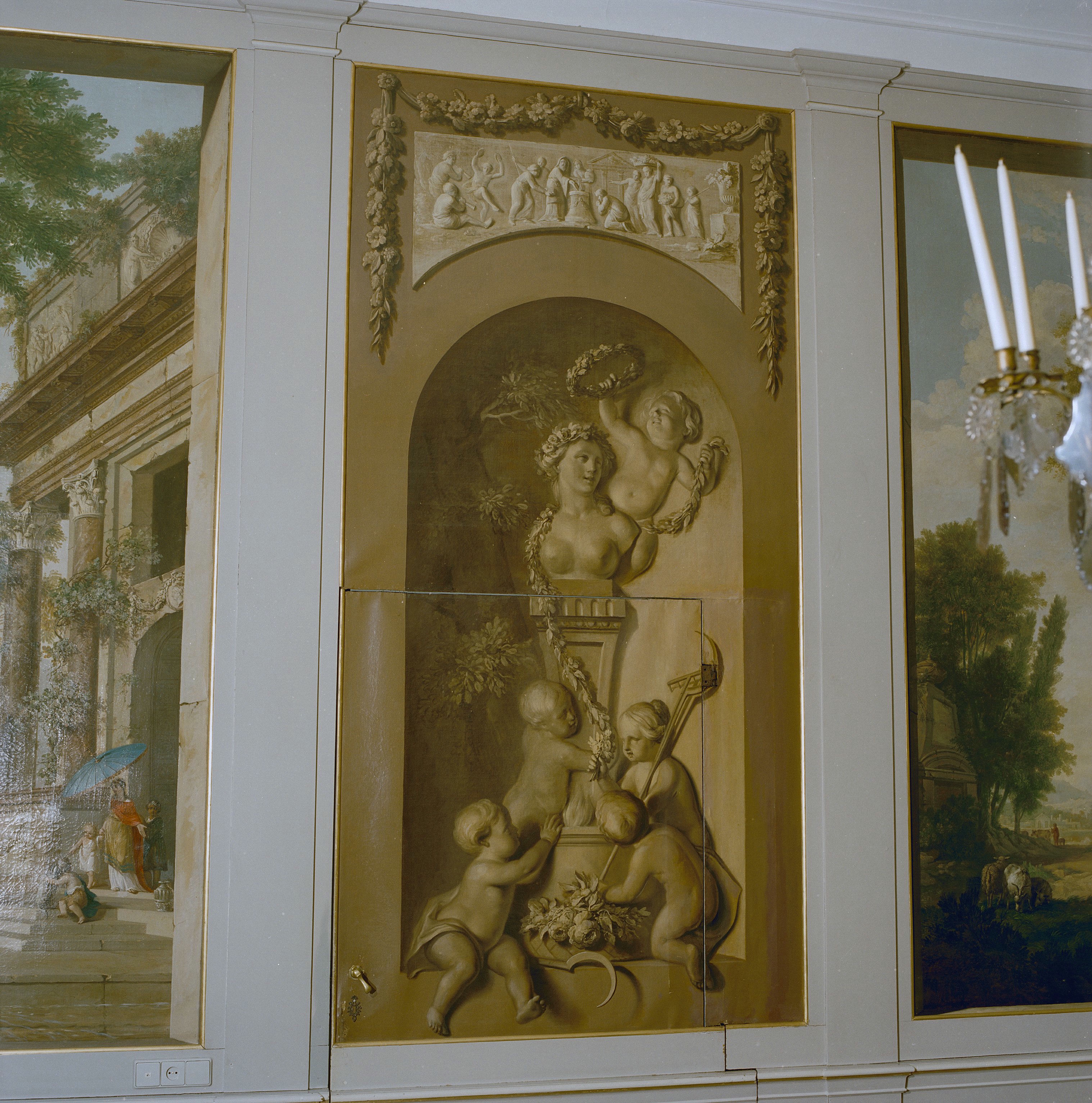
Wall painting at
Huis te Manpad.

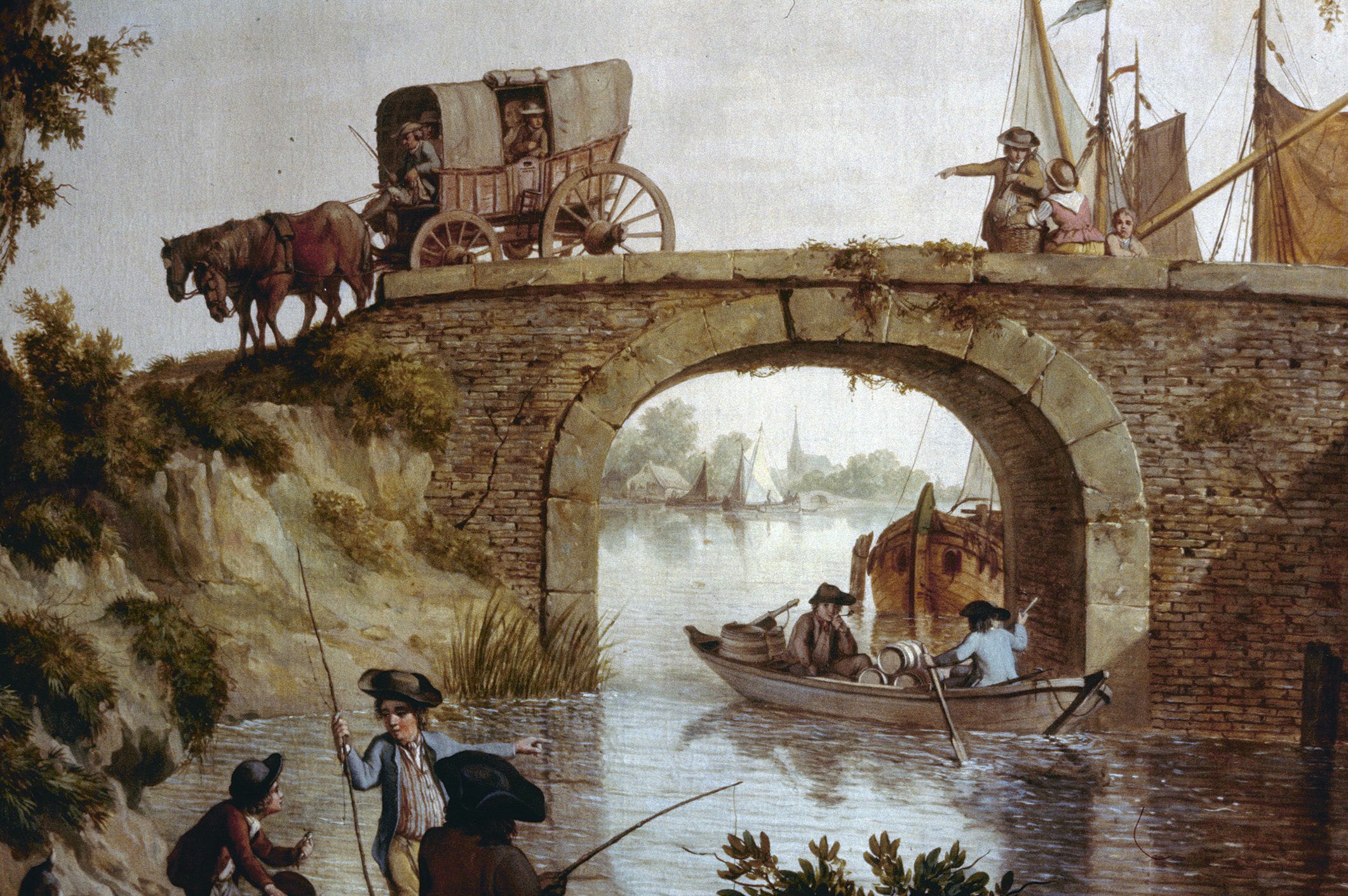
Detail from wallpaper at Herengracht 572, Amsterdam
