= Moritz Dessauer =

Moritz Dessauer was a Dutch Jewish engraver who worked in Amsterdam. Like Abraham Lion Zeelander, he was a member of the Amsterdam Academy.
