= Anthonie van den Bosch =

Dutch painter and printmaker (1763–1838)

- Portret van Antonie van den Bosch (Portrait of Antonie van den Bosch), 1802, possibly by Gabriël van Rooyen. Rijksmuseum
- Born: 4 December 1763; Nijmegen
- Died: 1 January 1838 (aged 74); Amsterdam
- Education: Stadstekenacademie

Anthonie van den Bosch (4 December 1763 – 1 January 1838), also known as Anthonie van den Bos or Antonie van den Bosch, was a Dutch painter, draughtsman and printmaker. He usually signed his work A. van den Bosch and sometimes A. van den Bos.

== Life ==
He was born in Nijmegen and died in Amsterdam.

From about 1778 Van den Bosch trained at the Stadstekenacademie (city drawing academy) in Amsterdam. He then worked as a landscape painter in the factory of Troost van Groenendoelen, which made painted wall hangings. When a change in fashion caused that trade to decline, he took up teaching drawing to support his family. He also painted theatre scenery.

In October 1801 he was one of a group of art lovers who set up the drawing society Kunst zij ons doel (Art be our aim) in Amsterdam, following a plan by Jacob Ernst Marcus and the landscape painter Hermanus Fock. He later became one of its directors, and in 1818 the society awarded him a gold medal.

His pupils included Jean Charles Carpentero and Willem Hekking. He also trained one of his sons himself.

His first wife was Jacoba Petronella Nevis van Schooten, with whom he had eight children. After her death he remarried at the age of fifty-seven and had several more children. In old age he could earn a living only with difficulty, with a wife and young children to provide for.

== Work ==
Teaching left him little time for painting in oils. He drew figures, landscapes and views of neighbourhoods, both coloured and uncoloured.

He left a large number of etchings: some portraits, many landscapes and, above all, farmhouses. He also worked in aquatint, in which he imitated drawings by old masters, and practised mezzotint and lithography. His prints in aquatint and etching include two views of the old town hall of Amsterdam after Pieter Saenredam. He made prints imitating drawings, in the manner of Ploos van Amstel, including some after Ostade and Jacob de Wit. A number of his prints bear the year 1801 or 1803.

At the Exhibition of Living Masters of 1826 in Amsterdam he showed a model of a spiral staircase.

G. van Royen and H.W. Caspari drew his portrait. In 1811 Marcus etched a print after a drawing by Caspari, showing Van den Bosch with three other artists.

In 1910 the Rijksprentenkabinet held an almost complete set of his etchings; in 1981 it also held drawings by him.

== Gallery ==
Het Oude Stadhuis van Amsterdam, 1641 (The old town hall of Amsterdam, 1641), after Pieter Saenredam. Rijksmuseum

Rokende boeren bij een schouw (Peasants smoking by a fireplace), mezzotint and etching after a drawing by Adriaen van Ostade. Rijksmuseum

IJspret op de hoek van Spui en Nieuwezijds Voorburgwal (Fun on the ice at the corner of Spui and Nieuwezijds Voorburgwal), watercolour after Jan van Kessel. Rijksmuseum

Watermolen aan den Uithoorn (Water mill in Uithoorn), 1790 – 1810. Amsterdam Museum

Portretten van H. Lageman, Ch. Dubois, G.J. Michaëlis en A. van den Bos (Portraits of H. Lageman, Ch. Dubois, G.J. Michaëlis and A. van den Bos), by Jacob Ernst Marcus after Hendrik Willem Caspari, 1811. Rijksmuseum
