= Hendrik Pothoven =

Dutch drawer and painter

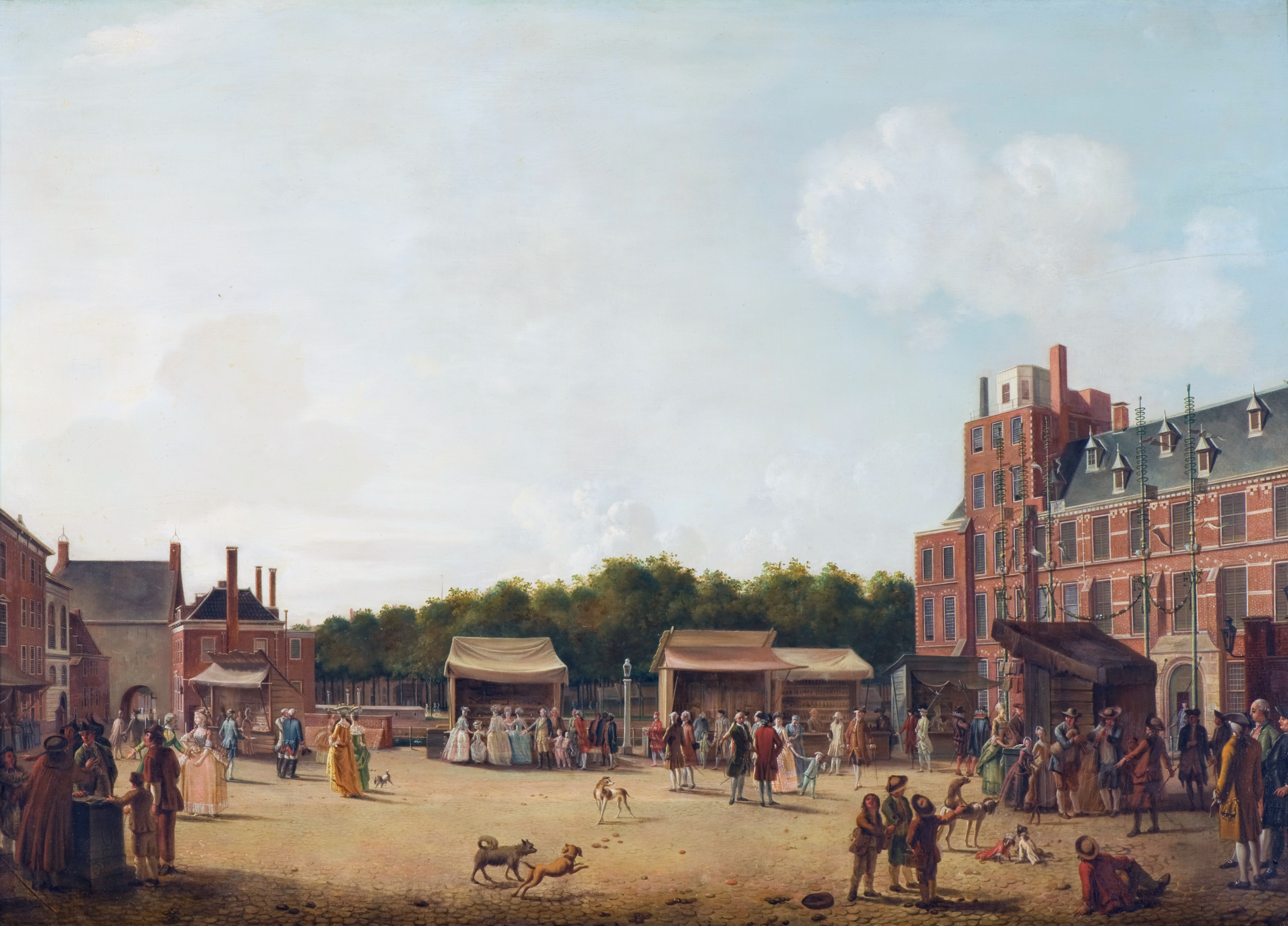
Buitenhof during the Hague circus, view towards the Gevangenpoort, 1781

Hendrik Pothoven (25 December 1725 – 29 January 1807) was an 18th-century drawer and painter from the Dutch Republic.

According to the RKD he was a pupil of Frans de Bakker and Philip van Dijk. He was a follower of Frans van Mieris and Adriaen van de Velde; he is best known for his portraits, landscapes, and engravings. He worked in his native Amsterdam until 1764, when he moved to The Hague, where he later died.
