= Abraham Lion Zeelander =

Dutch engraver (1789–1856)

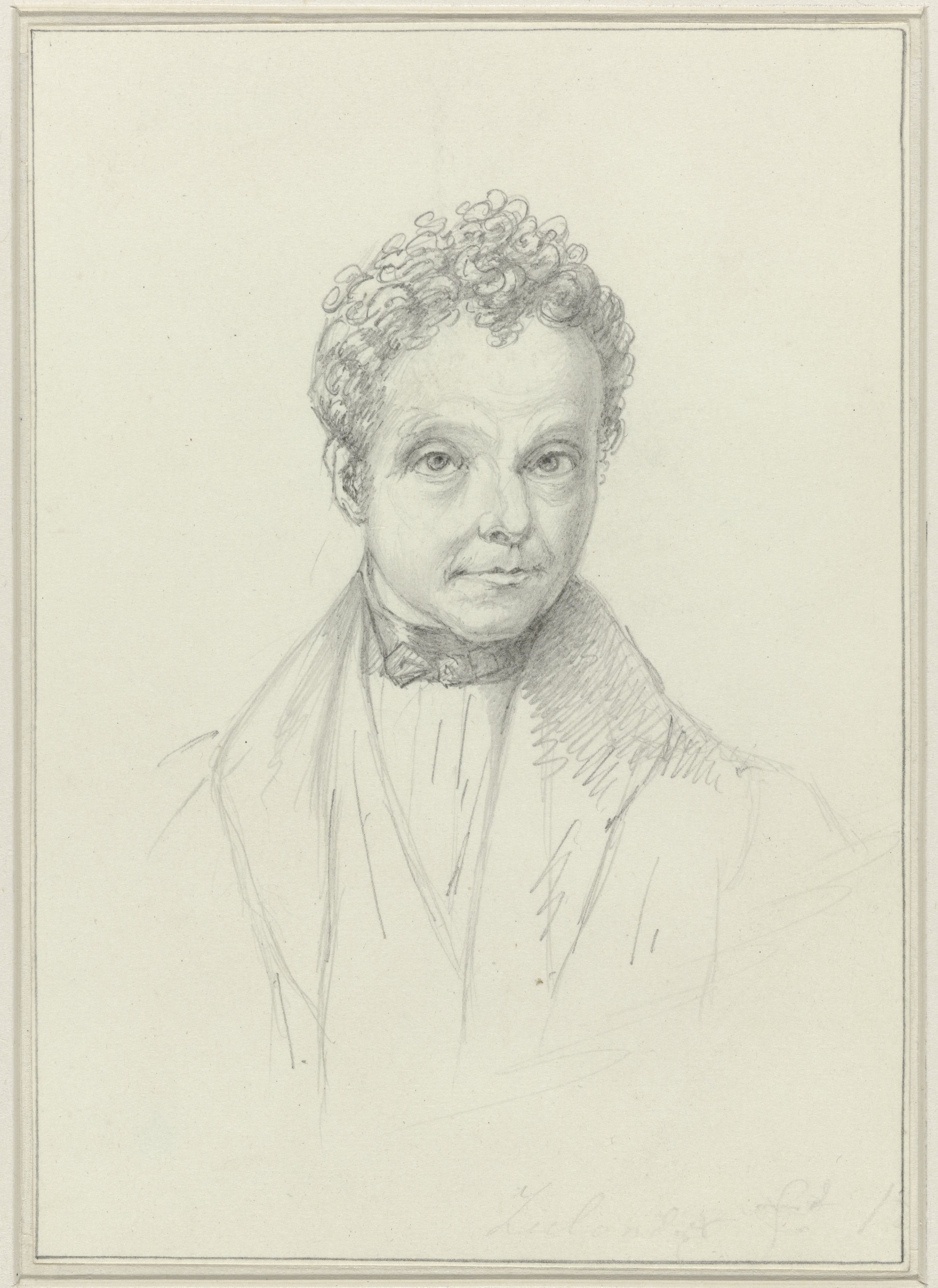
- Self-portrait, pencil. Rijksmuseum
- Born: 30 December 1789; Amsterdam
- Died: 16 December 1856 (aged 66); Amsterdam
- Education: Pupil of Jacob Ernst Marcus
- Awards: Knight of the Order of the Oak Crown (1850)

Abraham Lion Zeelander (30 December 1789 (Note: Hinterding and Horsch give 1788 as the year of birth.) – 16 December 1856) was a Dutch engraver, etcher, lithographer, draughtsman and watercolourist. He mainly made prints after the work of other artists. From 1842 to 1850 he engraved 183 prints after paintings in the collection of King William II, on the king's commission.

== Life ==
A.L. Zeelander was born and died in Amsterdam. He was of Jewish descent. He lived and worked in Amsterdam, and from 1843 to 1856 in The Hague.

He learned the art of engraving from Jacob Ernst Marcus. In 1812 Marcus etched a portrait of him after a drawing by Hendrik Willem Caspari, which was included in Marcus's Studie-prentwerk (study prints).

In 1814 Zeelander won the highest prize of the society Kunst zij ons doel, and in 1821 the highest prize of the Stadstekenacademie in Amsterdam: a gold medal. In July 1850 he was made a knight of the Order of the Oak Crown for his skill as an engraver.

== Work ==
In his youth Zeelander painted a few small landscapes. He engraved mainly after the work of others, including an interior after Gerrit Dou and one after Paul Noël, two landscapes after Albertus Brondgeest, two horses after Leendert Overbeek, and two prints after Wouwerman and Teniers. A series of six landscapes with figures was his own: he drew them from life and engraved them himself. He also supplied small prints for the Nederlandsche Muzen-Almanak.

Between 1814 and 1856 he exhibited in Amsterdam and The Hague; his entries included a landscape with figures, a moonlit view, engravings, and drawings after 17th-century masters.

=== Prints after the gallery of William II ===
On 29 September 1842 King William II asked him for a trial piece after a painting from the royal collection, leaving the choice of painting to Zeelander; he chose a work by Bartolomé Esteban Murillo. Zeelander was then commissioned to render the whole collection in line engraving, as an illustrated companion to the gallery catalogue that C.J. Nieuwenhuys was compiling. He was at work on the prints from early 1843.

By 1850 he had finished 183 engravings, all after old masters and none after a contemporary painting. Bergvelt dates the publication, Gravures aux traits, to 1848. Zeelander received 50 guilders for each print, with his expenses paid on top; the project cost about 11,000 guilders in all.

In 1851, short of money, he offered his preparatory drawings for sale. Regarding himself as the court engraver, he hoped for a pension of 600 guilders a year, and on 6 April 1851 he enquired about an application for one. It is not known whether a pension was granted.

== Gallery ==
Twee tekenende kinderen en portretten van A.L. Zeelander en Anthony Oberman (two children drawing, with portraits of A.L. Zeelander and Anthony Oberman), etching by Jacob Ernst Marcus after Hendrik Willem Caspari, 1812. Rijksmuseum

Gedenkteken voor de watersnood van 1809 (memorial of the flood of 1809), after Hermanus Fock, 1809. Rijksmuseum

Bevroren IJ bij Amsterdam (the frozen IJ near Amsterdam), after Albertus Brondgeest, 1799–1856. Rijksmuseum

Tekenende kunstenaar bekeken door kinderen (artist drawing, watched by children), from the series Zes landschappen (six landscapes), 1799–1856. Rijksmuseum

Man met jongen voor ruïne (man and boy before a ruin), from the series Zes landschappen, 1799–1856. Rijksmuseum

Gezicht op de stad Havana (view of Havana), after J. Steyn, 1839. Rijksmuseum

Interieur met moeder en kinderen (interior with mother and children), watercolour after Gerard Dou, 1799–1856. Rijksmuseum

Verloofd paar in een interieur op het eiland Marken (engaged couple in an interior on the island of Marken), lithograph after Christiaan Julius Lodewijk Portman, 1834–1835. Rijksmuseum

Staand mannelijk naakt, op de rug gezien (standing male nude, seen from behind), 1808. Rijksmuseum

Zittend mannelijk naakt, op de rug gezien (seated male nude, seen from behind), 1820. Rijksmuseum
