= Jean Charles Carpentero =

Painter from Antwerp (1784–1823)

- Born: 22 December 1784; Antwerp
- Died: 22 December 1823 (aged 39); Antwerp
- Education: Pupil of Mattheus Ignatius van Bree and Van den Bosch

Jean Charles Carpentero (22 December 1784 – 22 December 1823), also known as Jan Karel Carpentero or Johannes Carolus Carpentero, was a Flemish landscape and animal painter.

== Life ==
Carpentero was born and died in Antwerp. He lived in the Heilige Geeststraat in Antwerp.

His father, Franciscus, was a dealer in paintings; his mother was Maria Theresia Koeckellenbergh. He married Isabella Maria Francisca Nauwelaers. His son Hendrik Joseph Gommarus Carpentero (1820–1874) was also a painter, mainly of rural genre scenes and interiors.

He trained under Van den Bosch and Mattheus Ignatius van Bree. Sources differ on which Van den Bosch this was: in the Nationaal Biografisch Woordenboek (1983), Norbert Hostyn names him as L. van de Bosch and describes both teachers as Antwerp masters, whereas the RKD lists the Amsterdam painter Anthonie van den Bosch as his teacher.

In July 1815 he was one of a group of Antwerp artists who petitioned King William I of the Netherlands for the return of the works of art that the French had looted from the city during the French Revolution.

His pupils included Pieter Martinus Gregoor, who was born in Dordrecht, and Joseph Jacops from Antwerp. Gustaaf Wappers reportedly had his first lessons from him in his youth.

== Work ==
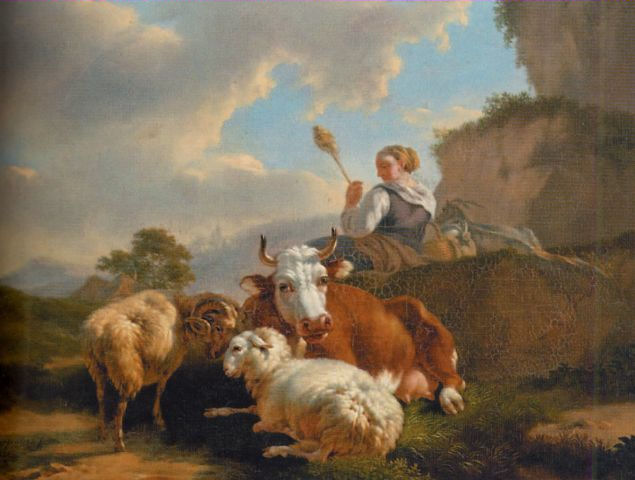
Scène pastorale (Pastoral scene), 1822

He followed the pre-Romantic style of the Antwerp painter Balthasar Paul Ommeganck so closely that his work was sometimes taken for Ommeganck's.

He exhibited at the Antwerp salons of 1805, with Landschap met vee dat door een wed waadt (Landscape with cattle wading through a watering place); 1807, with Landschap met boeren en vee (Landscape with peasants and cattle); and 1813, with Zomerdag (Summer's day) and Zomerdag met ondergaande zon (Summer's day with setting sun). At the Antwerp exhibition of 1819 he won an accessit (honourable mention) for the best landscape painting, with a mountainous, wooded scene in which a young herdsman tends two cows, while sheep and their shepherd appear further back. At the Exhibition of Living Masters of 1820 in Amsterdam he showed two landscapes with sheep.
