= Museum van de Geest =

Psychiatry museum in the Netherlands

Coordinates: 52°23′25″N 4°38′16″E

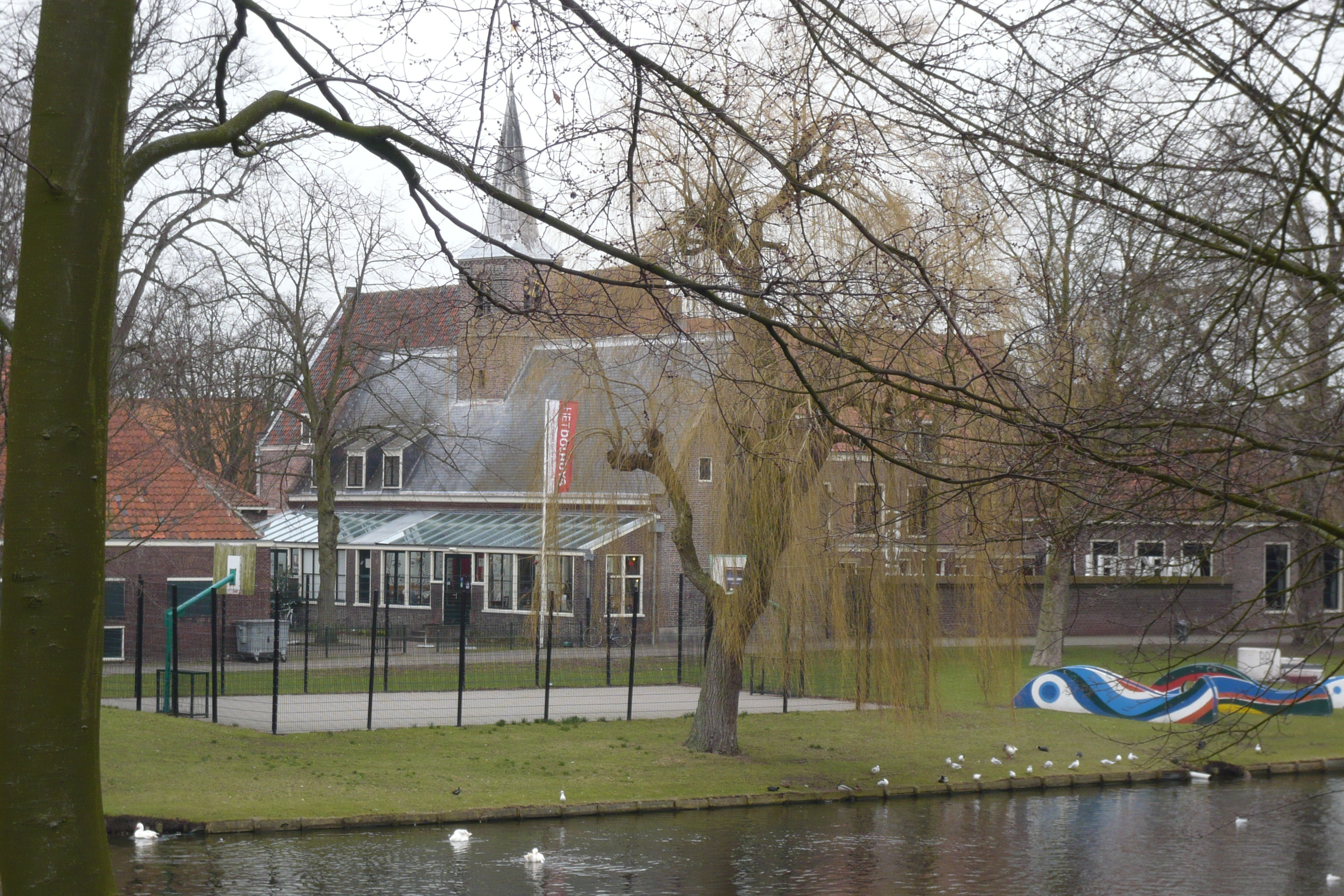
View of the complex from the park across the Singel

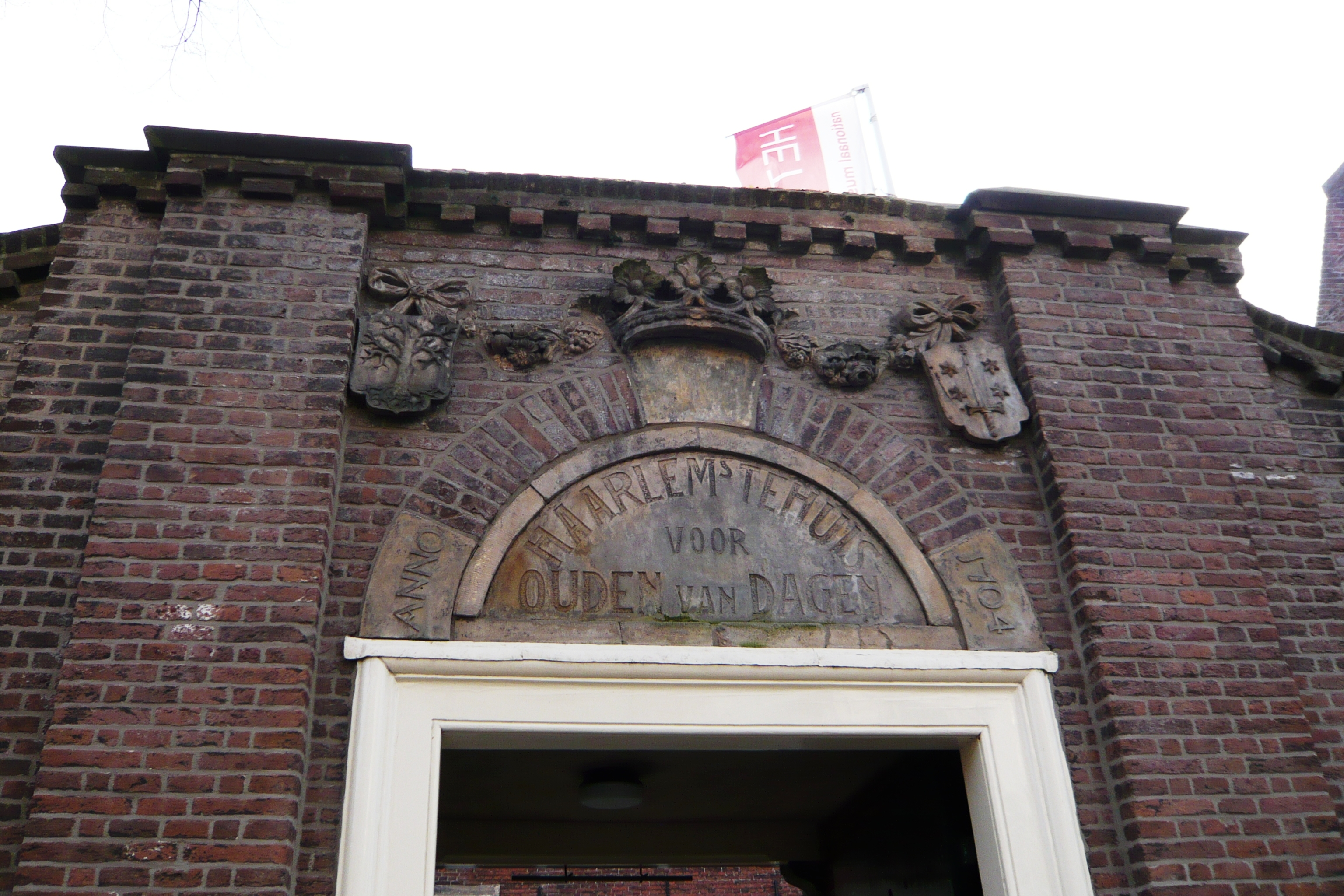
Keystone above entrance says "Haarlem old age home, 1704"

Museum van de Geest ("Museum of the Mind") was created in 2020 when Het Dolhuys ("The Madhouse"), the national museum for psychiatry in Haarlem, the Netherlands, merged with the Outsider Art Museum from Amsterdam. Het Dolhuys had been founded in 2005 in the newly renovated former old-age home known as Schoterburcht, located just across the Schotersingel from the Staten Bolwerk park.

The whole Het Dolhuys complex is much older, having for centuries been a hospital known as the Leproos-, Pest- en Dolhuys (Leper, Plague, and Mad House).

Outsider art, located in the Amsterdam part of the museum, shows artwork created by artists who only listen to the voice within themselves.

== Museum of Psychiatry ==
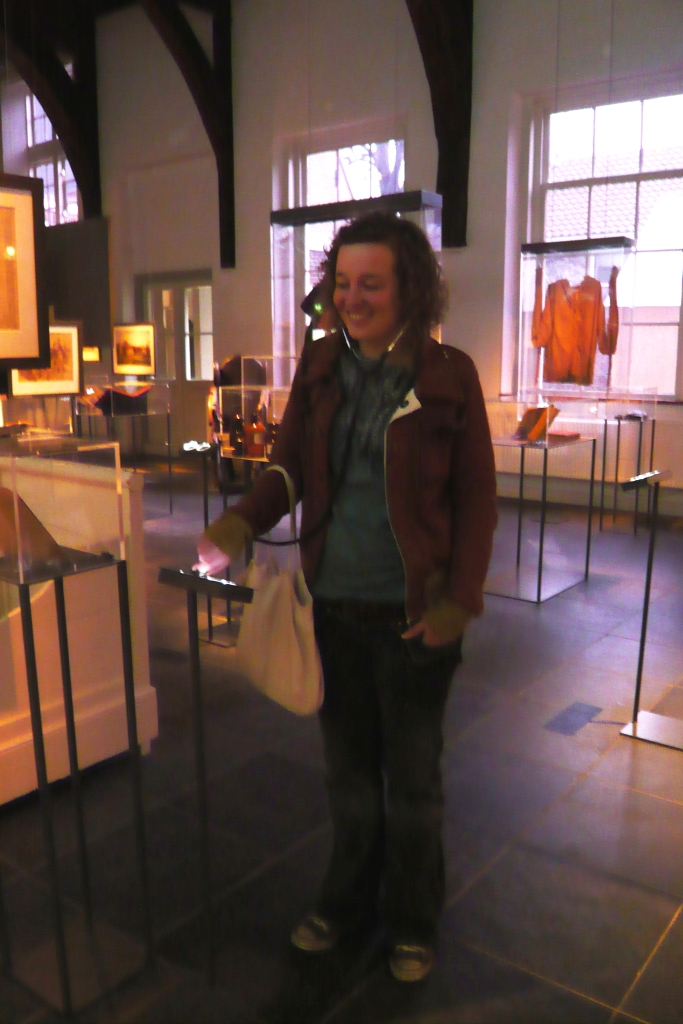
Visitors "listen" to patient oral histories using a stethoscope - the museum puts the visitor in the role of observer/doctor.

The collection is based on the artifacts of seven psychiatric hospitals; GGZ Noord-HollandNoord, Mentrum, De Meren, Buitenamstel, GGZ Dijk en Duin, De Geestgronden, and Rivierduinen. It is an interactive museum. The visitor is encouraged to think about the contrasts between sanity and insanity, between visitors and inmates, and between participants and observers. On display are the various personal effects of famous inmates of psychiatric hospitals, as well as old treatment methods and tools used by the hospitals themselves.

== History of the complex Het Dolhuys ==
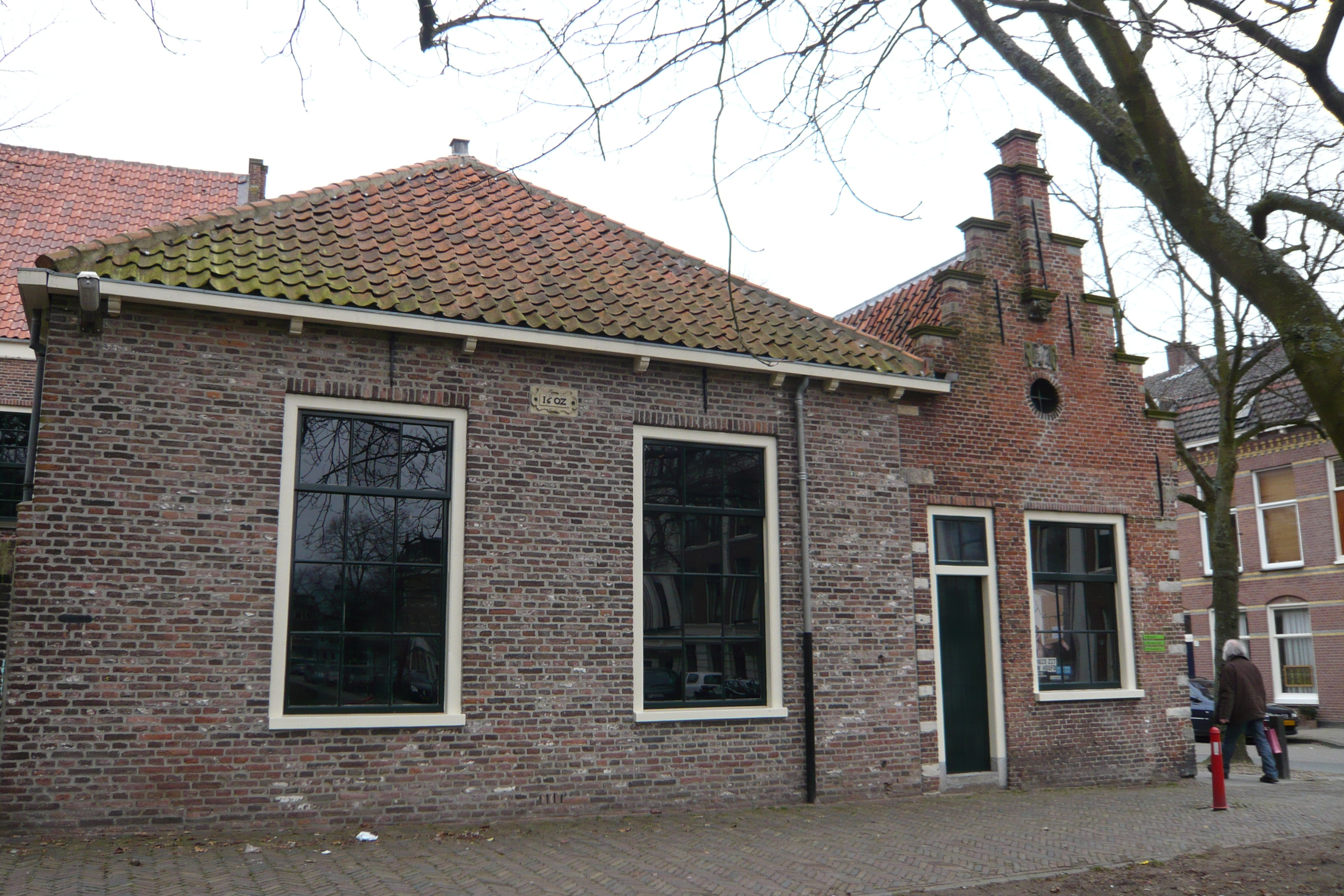
Rightmost building shows date 1564.

Like many other Dutch cities, Haarlem had a hospice situated outside the city walls for lepers, plague victims, and other sufferers considered by the city council to have infectious diseases. In council archives, it is often referred to as "De Siecken" ("The Sick"), since that was the name of the street it was on (now the Schotersingel). The Dolhuys was situated in the former town of Schoten (annexed by Haarlem in 1927). What made this one so unusual was the privilege granted to Haarlem in 1413 to test lepers from all over the provinces Holland and Zeeland and grant them a vuilbrief, or document certifying their status as leper. With this paper, the leper was legally allowed to beg. According to tradition, a leper would be cured after begging a certain amount of money. When a vuilbrief expired, the subject could request a new one. This privilege meant a guaranteed form of income for this institution, since it also meant a steady stream of visitors and accompanying traffic.

It wasn't until the 19th century that the regents of the Dolhuys actively worked on curing the inmates. The purpose until then was just to provide a safe place to stay for inmates who were dangerous to themselves or to society at large. Lepers who were not sick lived in "Akkerzieken", or homesteads in Akendam, an area north of Schoten, where they had rights to health services from the Dolhuys.

One of the oldest keystones in the front of the complex shows the year 1564. In the 16th and 17th centuries the Dolhuys regents became quite wealthy, because many lepers coming for their vuilbrief decided to stay there, and doing so meant that all of their possessions reverted to the Dolhuys on their death. With a reduction of lepers, the house was converted to a poorhouse for children in 1653. Though it doubled as a home for poor children, the Dolhuys was sometimes still called "Leproos-huis" and later, "Pest-huis" when an outbreak of plague hit Haarlem in 1664. The painter Jan de Bray lost many members of his family in that outbreak, and they were probably cared for in the Dolhuys, where he won a commission to paint the regents three years later.

In the painting by Jan de Bray of the regents of the Dolhuys, a boy with head sores is seen collecting his vuilbrief and holding a lazarus-klep or klepper (clapper), a wooden rattle that he can use to call attention and beg with. His young age and the fact that he is unaccompanied means that he is probably an orphan inmate, who will be sent by the regents to collect money in Haarlem for their hospital.

Jan de Bray also painted the regentesses, who took care of the finances and the daily running of the hospital. The names of the regents and regentesses are known from archive information, but which names belong to which faces have been lost. The regent's meeting room, which had handpainted wall decorations by Jan Augustini installed in 1756, has recently been restored.

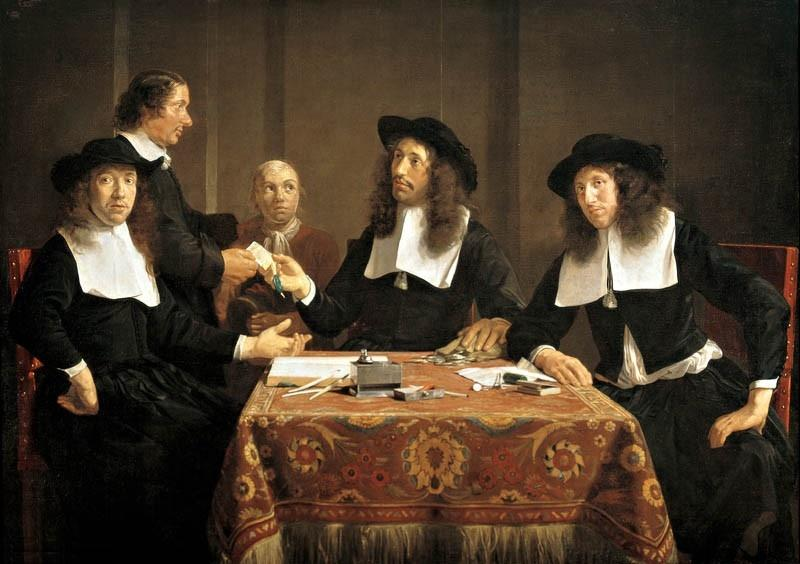
Regents of the Dolhuys, Jan de Bray, 1667

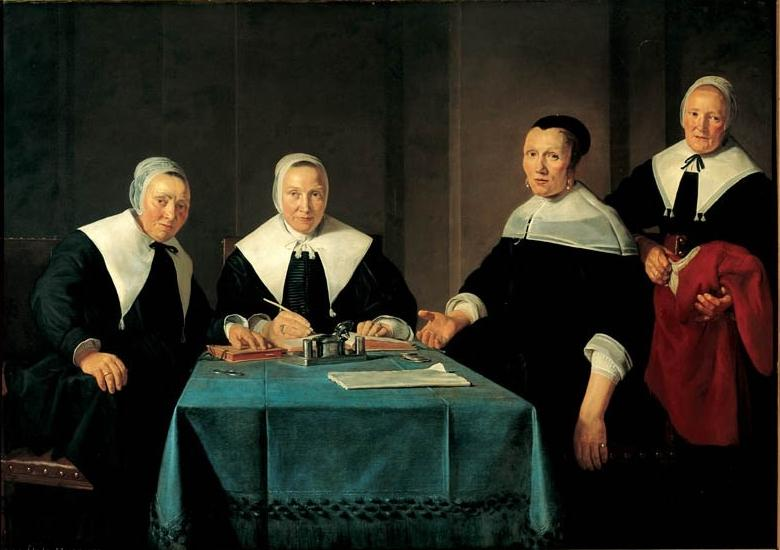
Regentesses of the Dolhuys, Jan de Bray, 1667

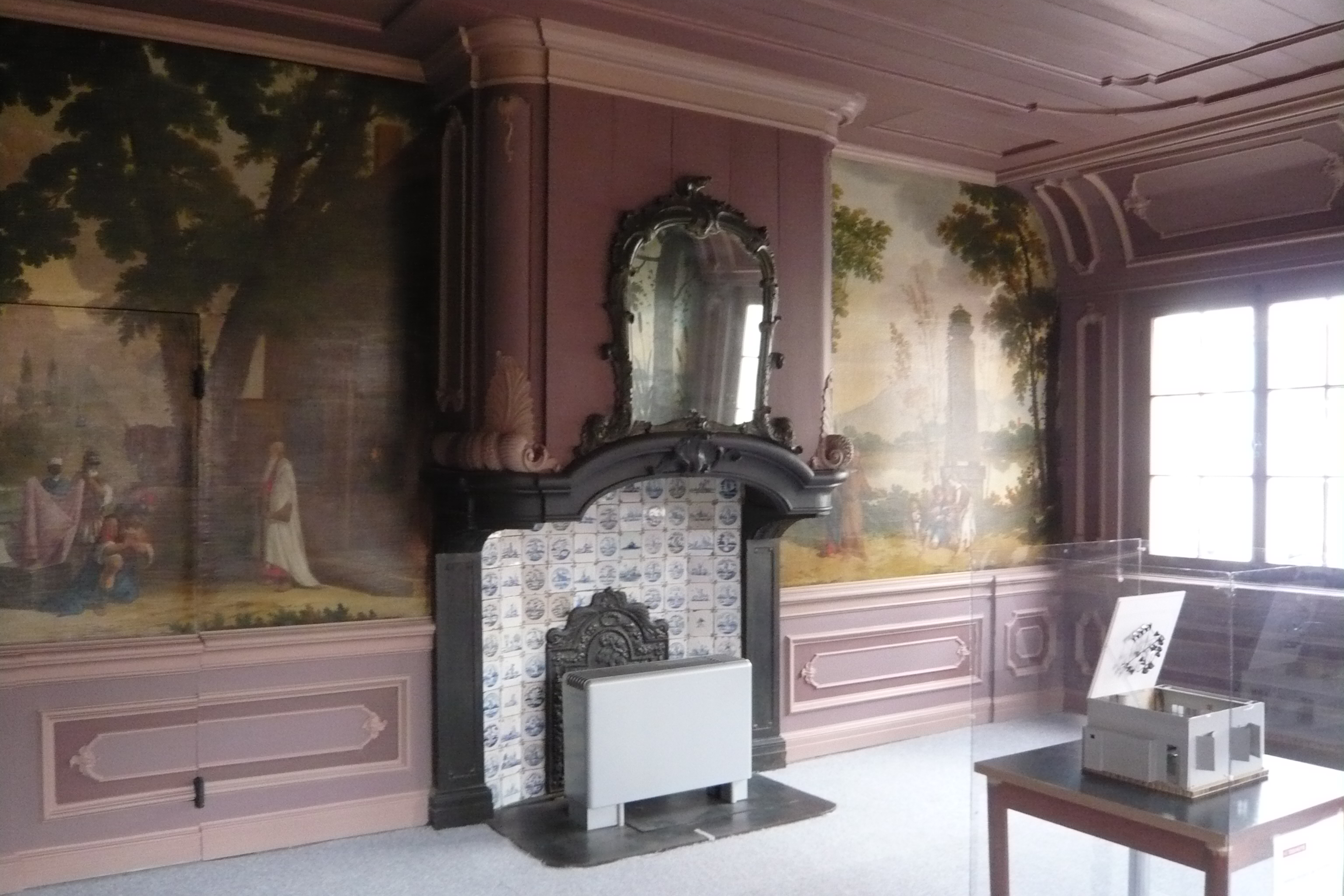
Regent's room Dolhuys, with wall decorations by Augustini, 1756

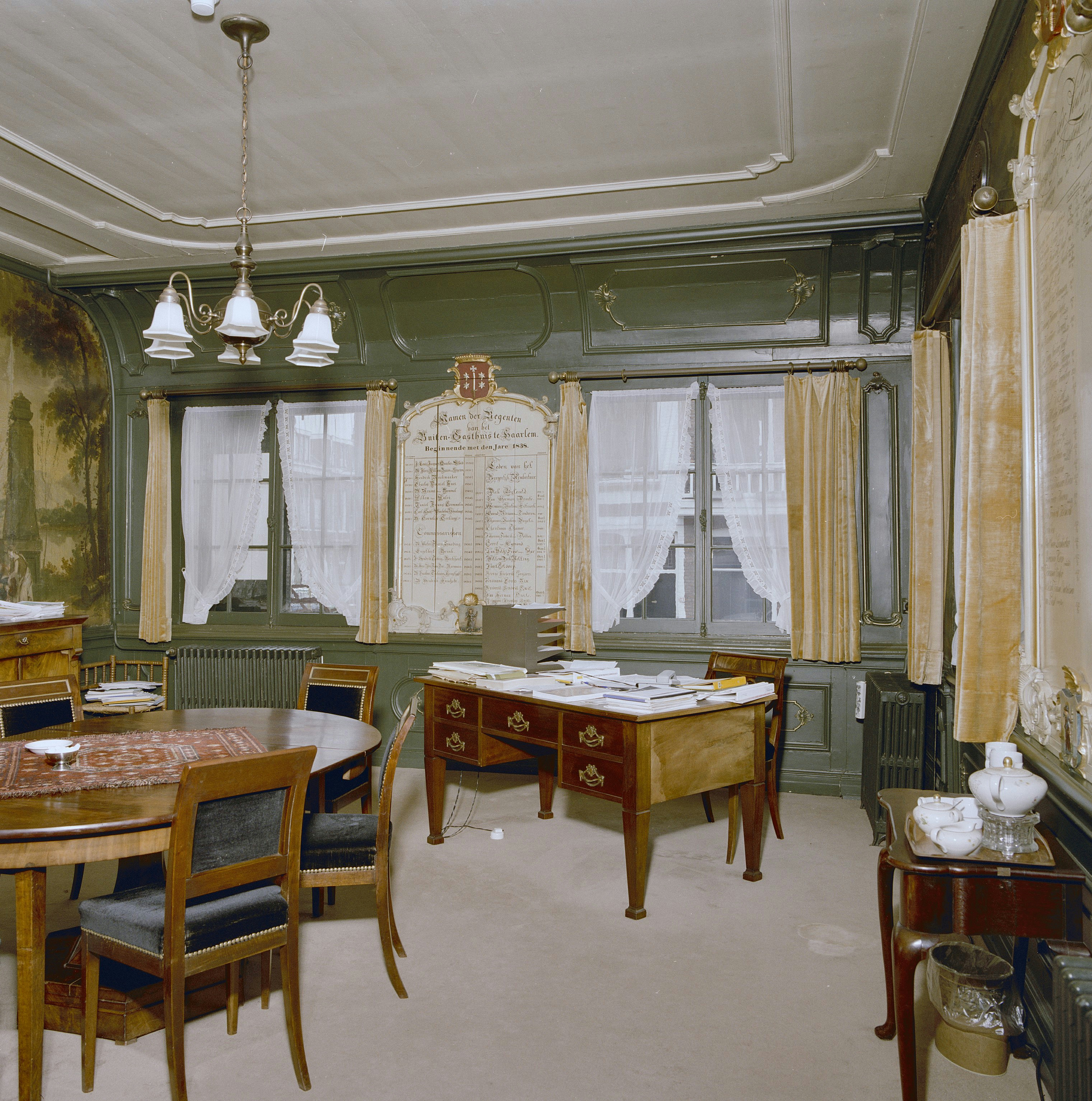
Regent's room Dolhuys

=== Willem Janszoon Verwer ===
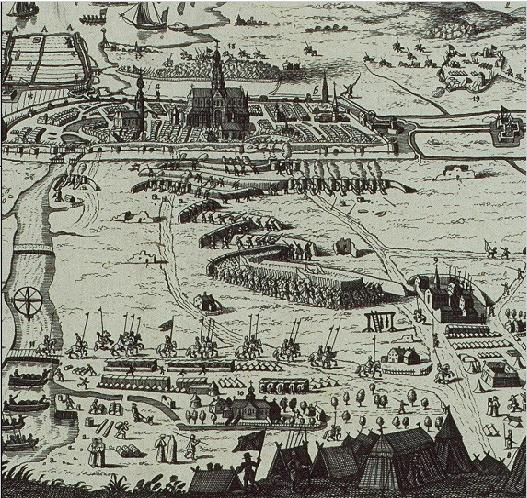
Sketch of the siege of Haarlem with the Dolhuys on the right.

Perhaps the most famous regent today of the medieval Dolhuys was Willem Janszoon Verwer, who kept a diary, most notably of his experiences during the siege of Haarlem from 1572 to 1581. This diary was copied and annotated by Gerdina Hendrika Kurtz in 1960 and later published in 1973. Verwer was a wealthy member of the Haarlem city council, as was his father. His father was listed in 1577 as one of the 20 richest men of Haarlem. During the siege of Haarlem the Spanish had their headquarters in Huis ter Kleef. Executions by hanging were carried out close to the Dolhuys, because soldiers were stationed there, and Verwer was a witness. He was Roman Catholic and his diary is written from this perspective. He later used his diary in court proceedings in Haarlem after the siege.

=== Order of Sint Lazarus ===
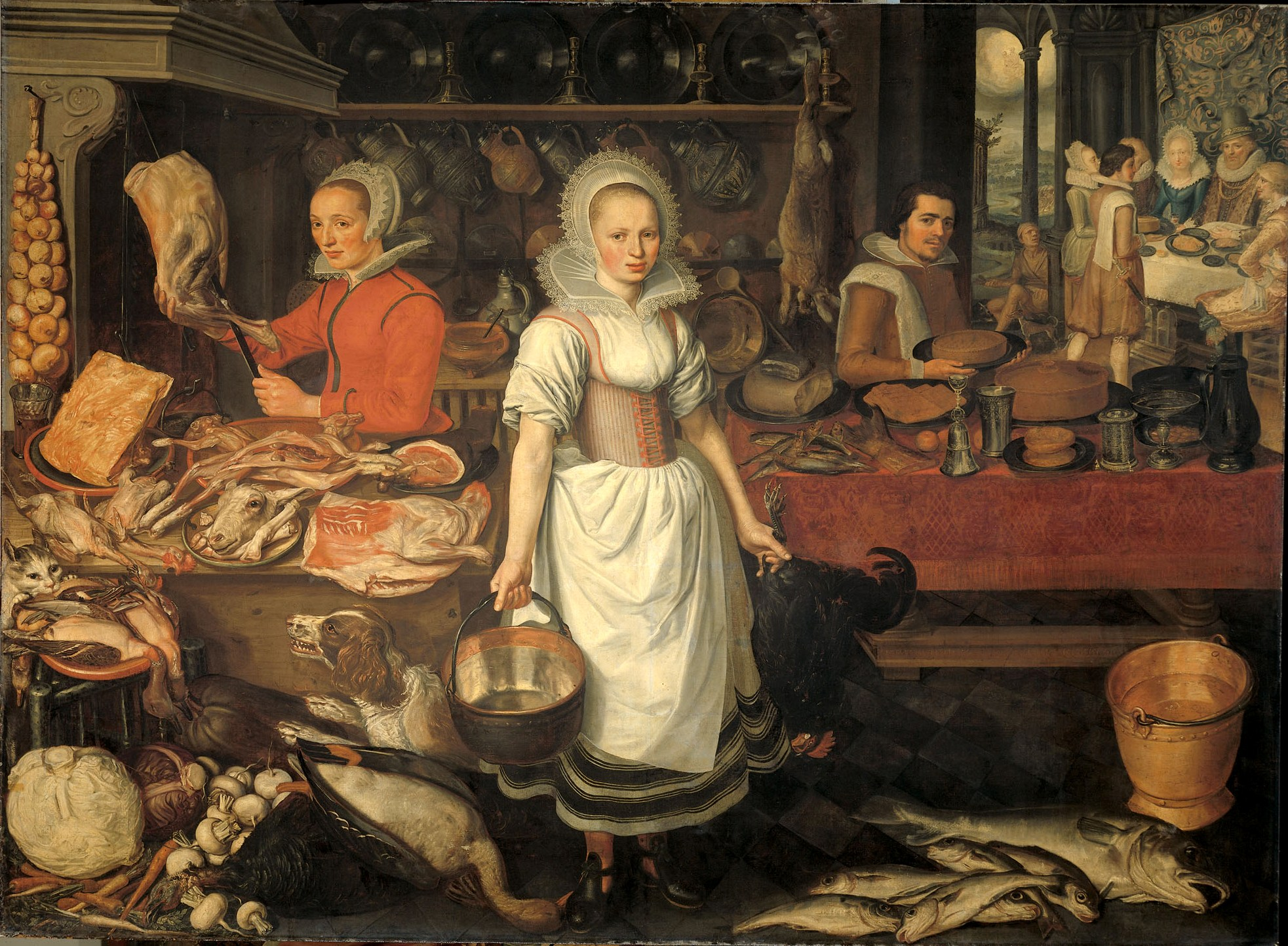
Lazarus and the rich man, painting by Pieter Cornelisz van Rijck, dated 1620, but probably similar to one by the same artist that hung in the regent's room in 1604 that was mentioned by Karel van Mander

The Dolhuys was a charitable institution for the elderly, orphans, lepers, and other poor or sick people who could not be helped by the St. Elisabeth Gasthuis within the city walls of Haarlem. Originally, the complex was a monastery in the Order of Saint Lazarus. The accompanying chapel was dedicated to Saint James. This is the oldest St. James chapel in Haarlem still standing; the oldest St. James chapel (1319) was located at the current location of the St. Jacobsgodshuis in the Hagestraat.

==== Leproos or Melaats ====
Leprosy was misunderstood, and any disease considered fatal and contagious, such as small pox, was grouped under the header lazerij, after the story of Lazarus. The sufferer was called a leproos or melaats, and was considered dead for the state, though the person was still alive. Some patients did in fact improve and leave, but many died there. A famous inmate who lived quite a long time was Malle Babbe. She was painted by Frans Hals, probably while his son Peter was living there.

== History of Psychiatry in the Netherlands ==
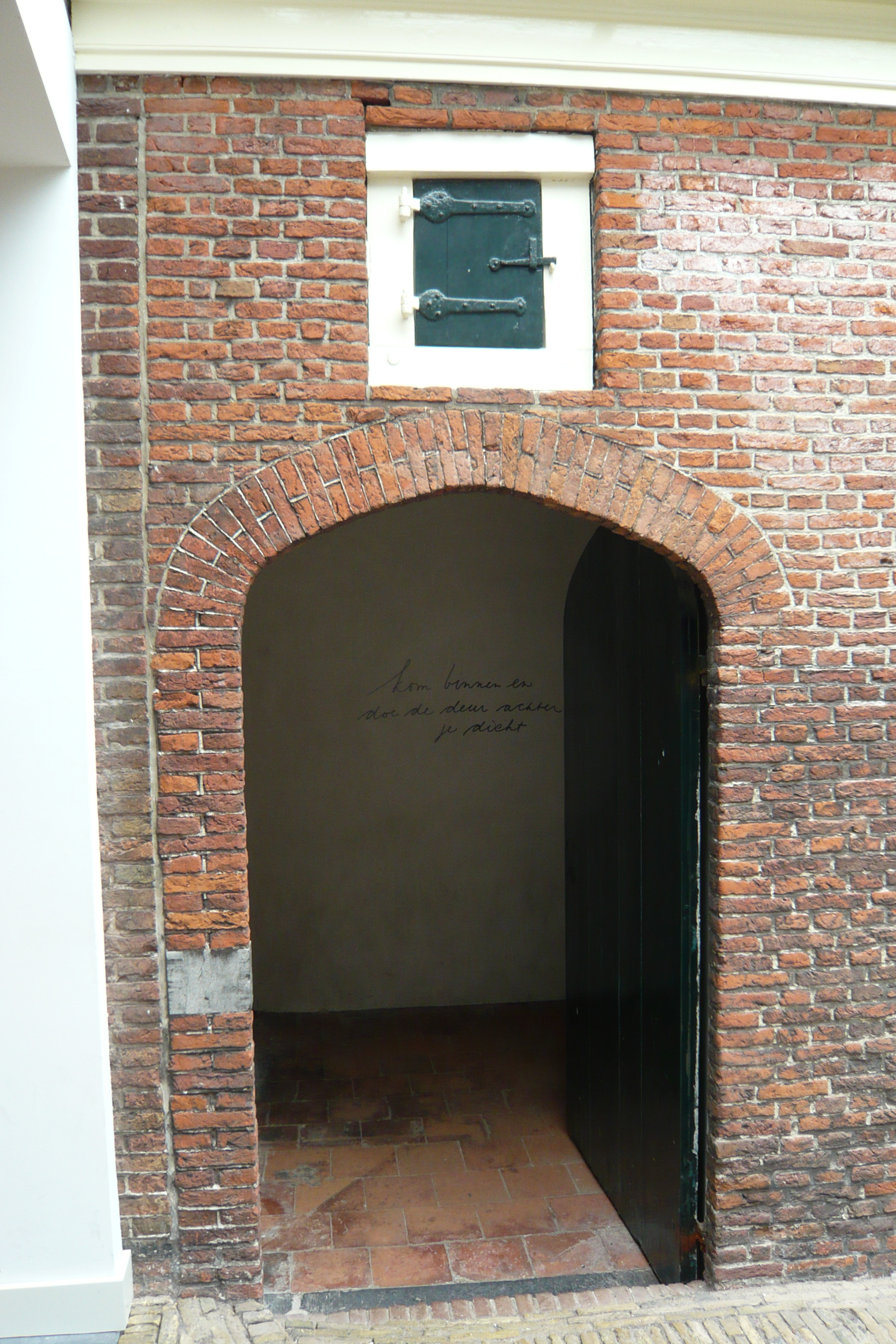
Former lockup cell for the insane within the Dolhuys complex. "Dol" meant "crazy".

Apart from the history of the building itself, the visitor can see items from surrounding mental institutions through the centuries. The main hall is devoted to an overview of the history of psychiatry treatment in the Netherlands. The museum is the owner of the archives of several former institutions and has a small exhibition hall for rotating shows based on their possessions, and also art from former psychiatry patients.

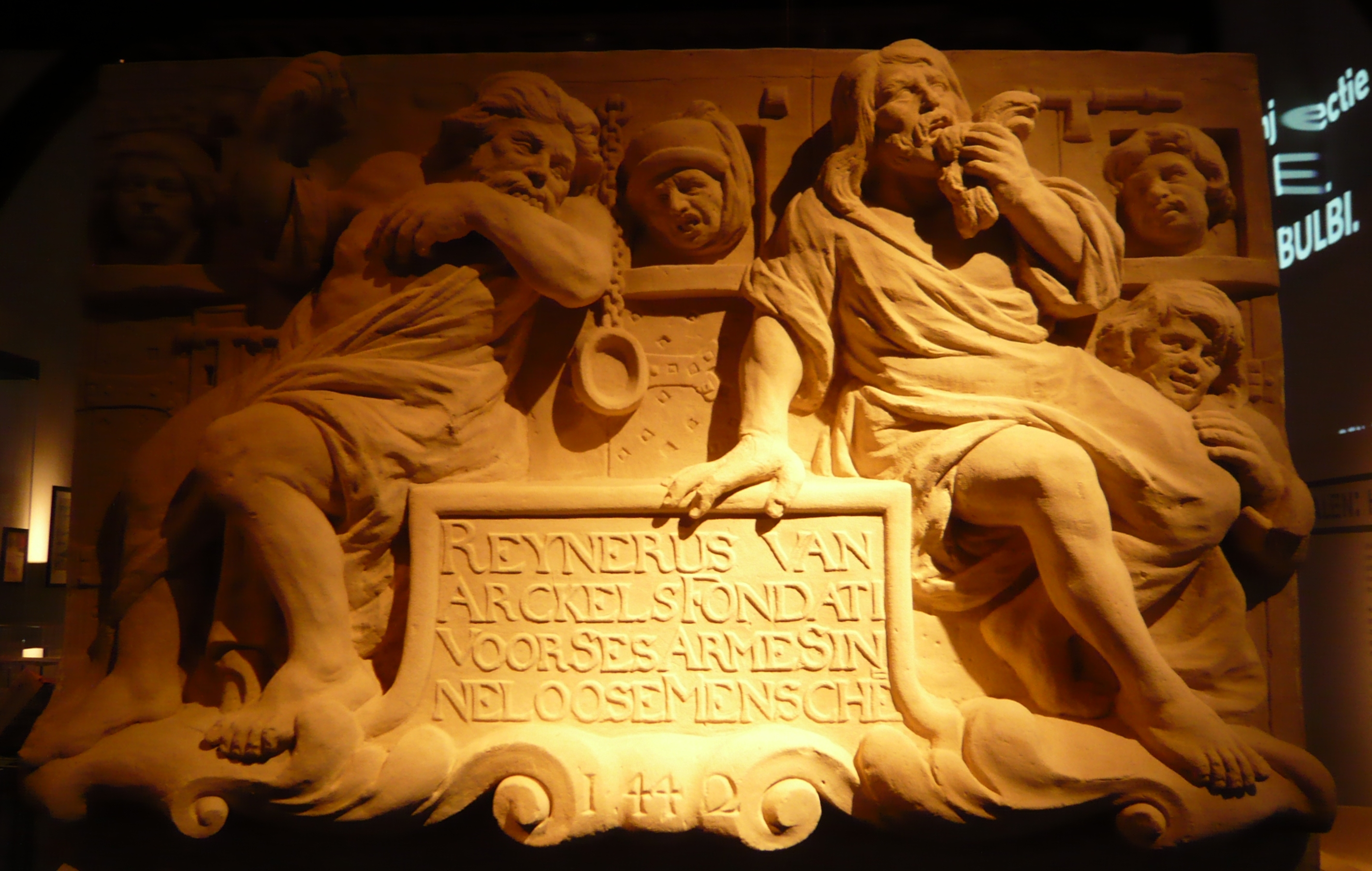
Former gable stone of a Dolhuys in Den Bosch.

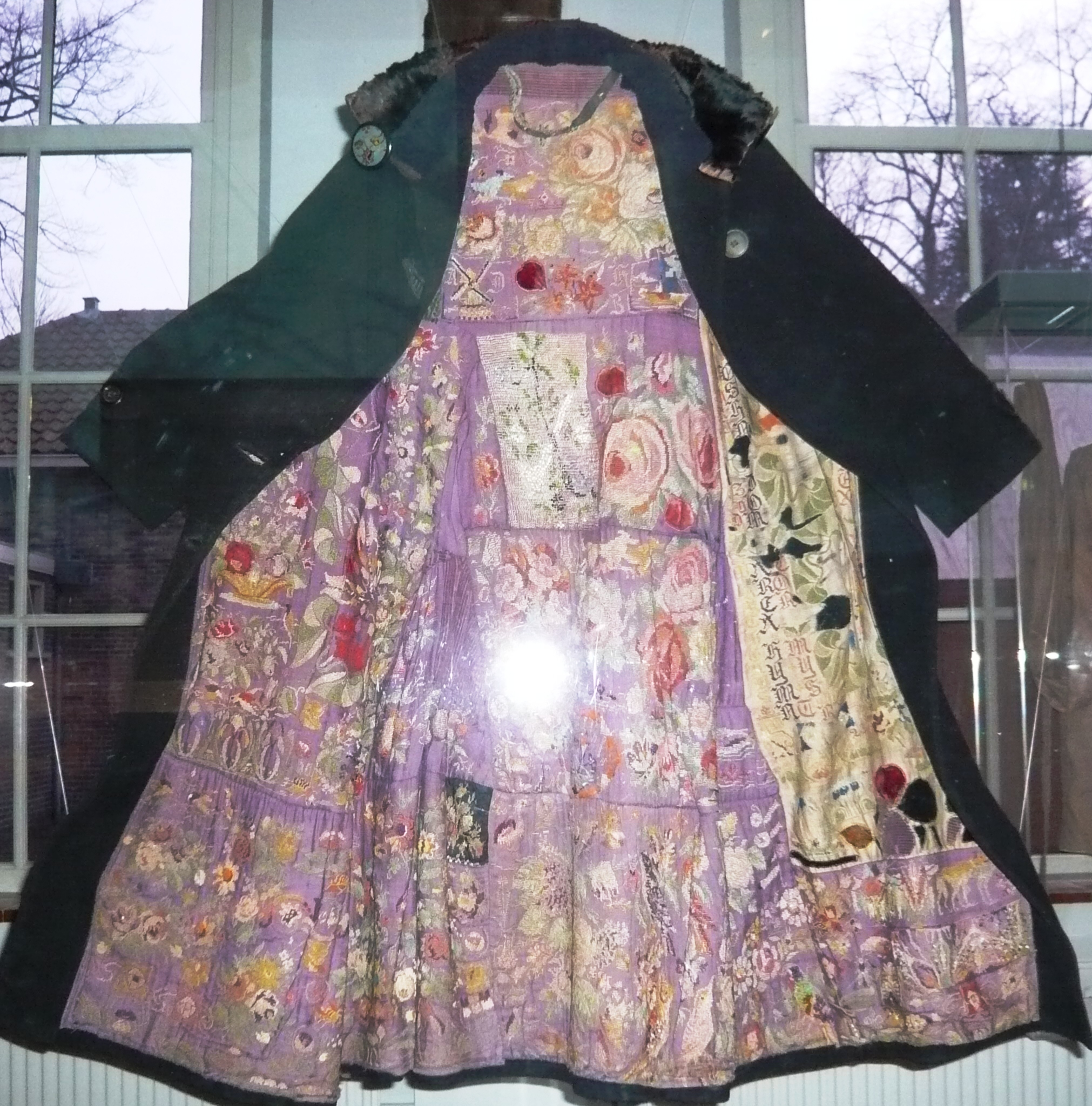
Former winter coat of a patient who embroidered the lining.

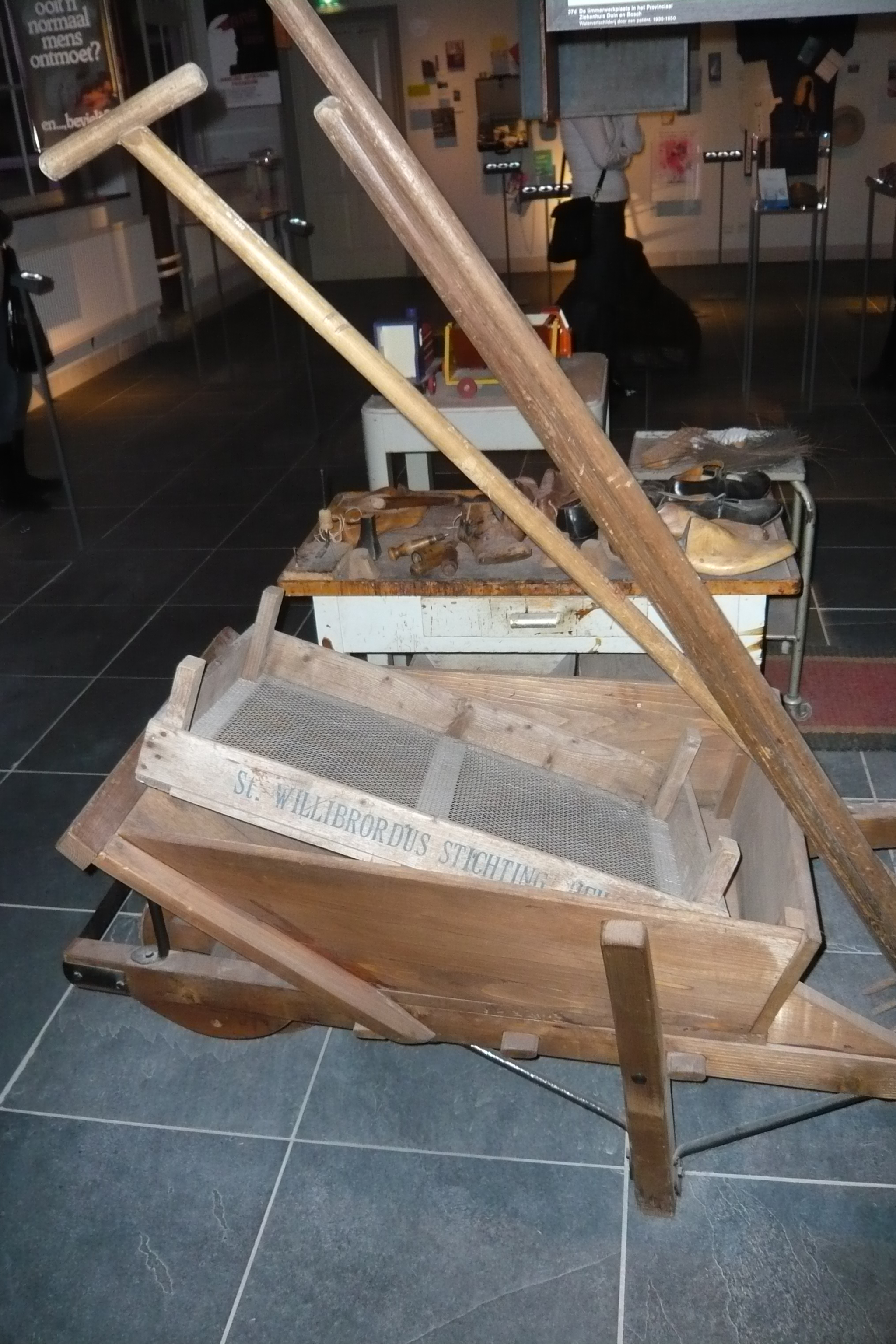
In former times, patients were also set to work making shoes, rugs, or field work.

== Adjoining Restaurant ==
The museum cafe is situated in the old St. James church and has its own entrance around the back of the complex. There is no admission, and it can be hired separately for parties or gatherings. There is also a rear hall that can be used for gatherings. Theatre performances and poetry readings have been given there.

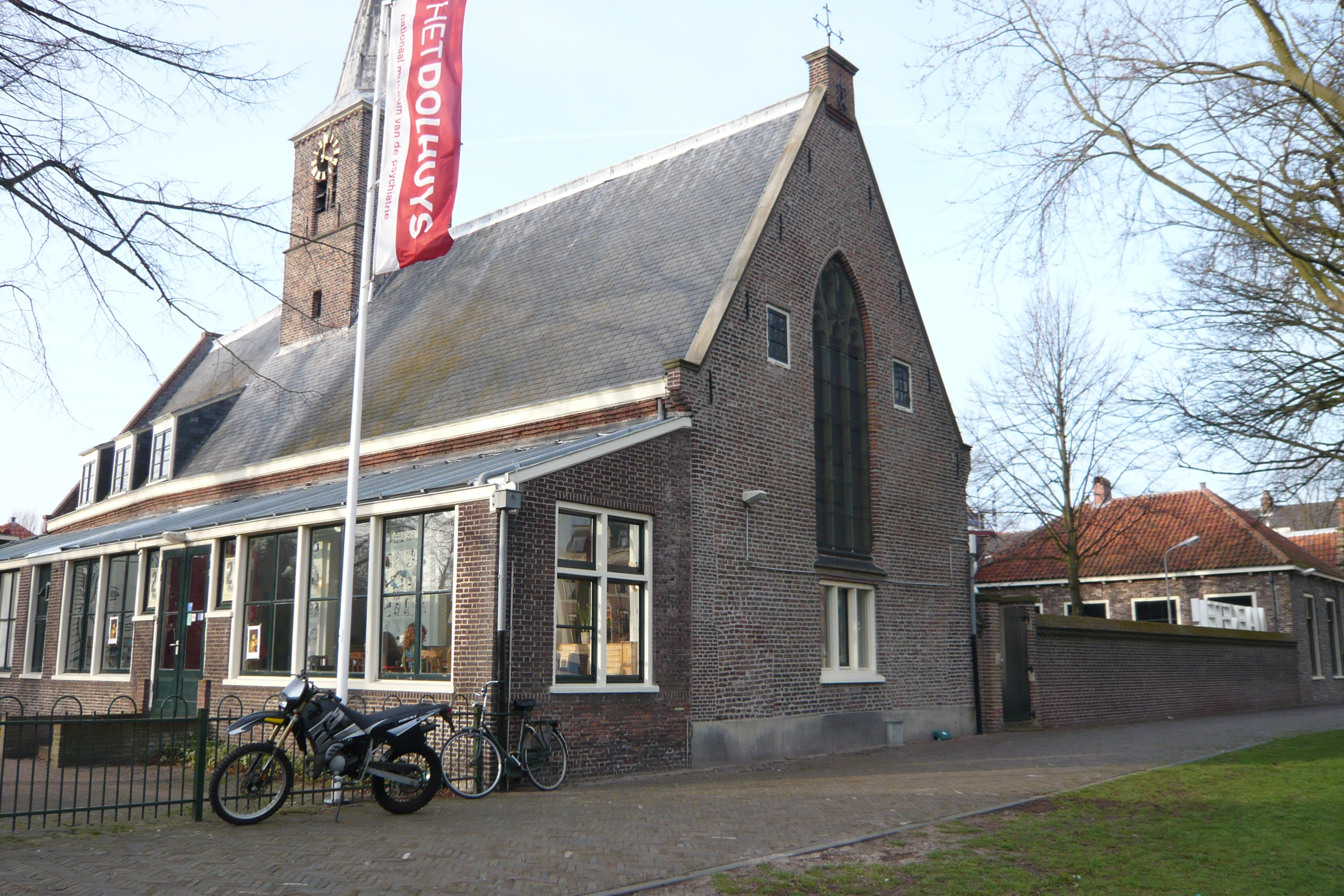
Old church, now a restaurant

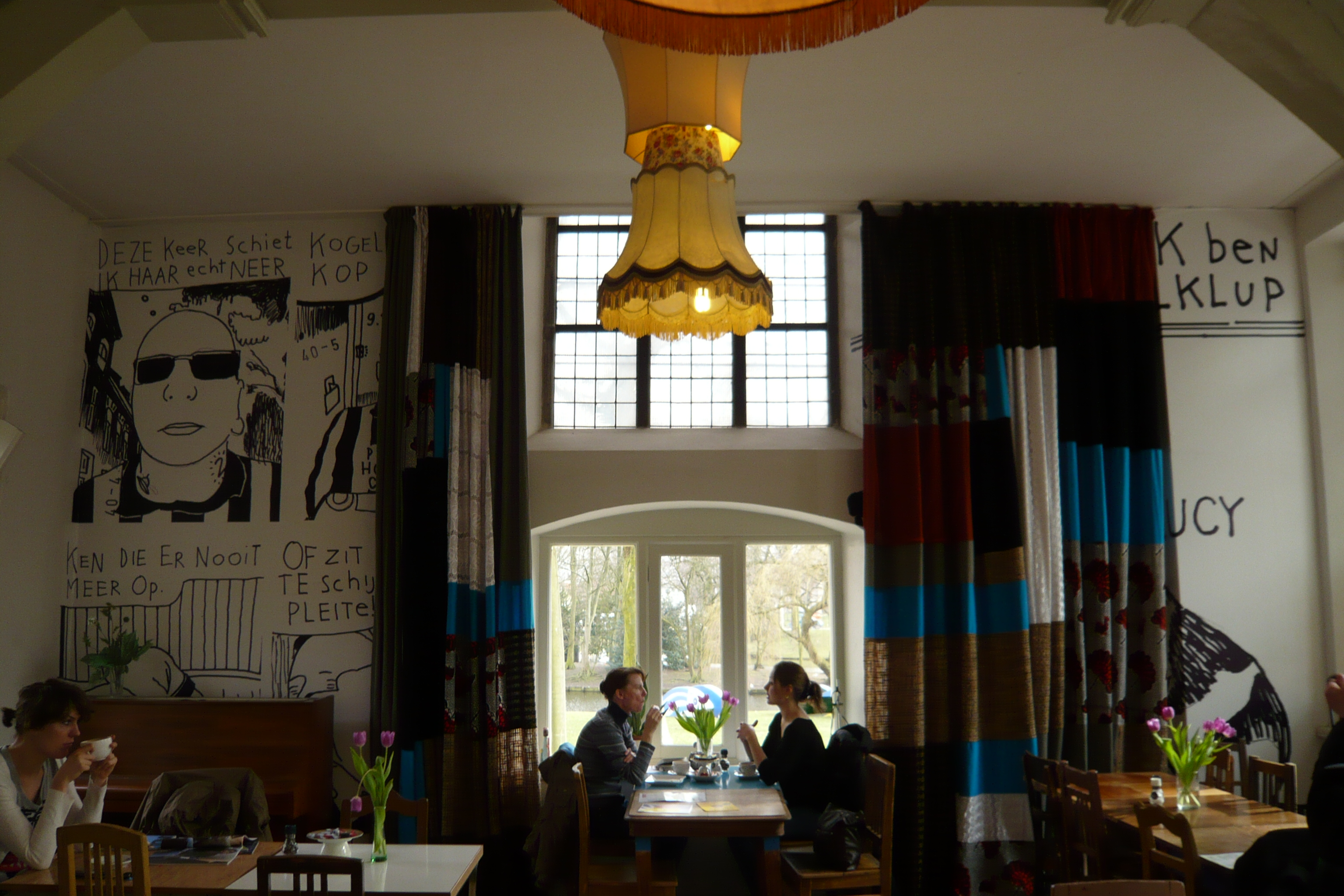
Restaurant for museum visitors, as well as park visitors.

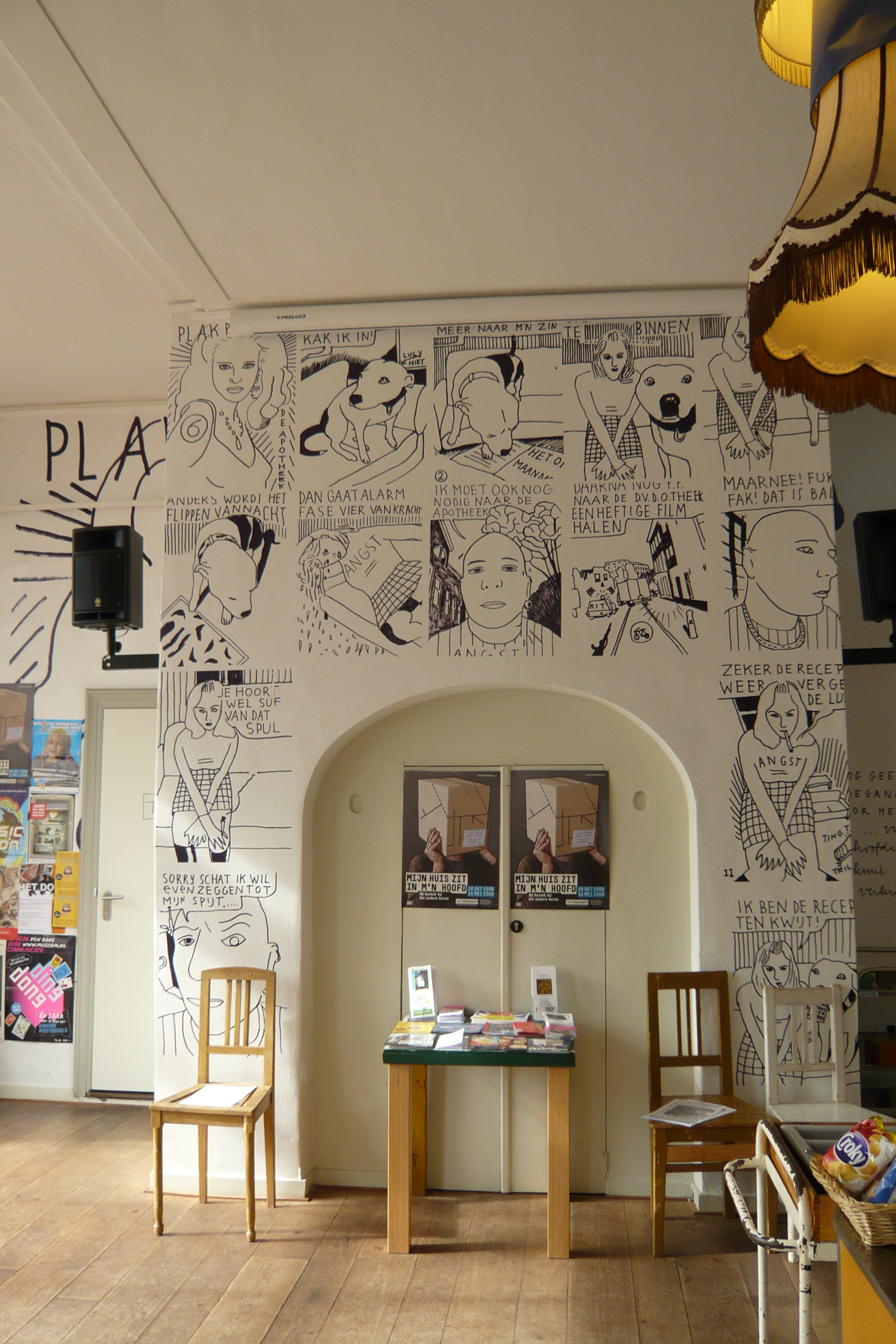
Former church entrance

== Outsider Art ==
In Amsterdam, the museum van de geest | Outsider Art shows leading art works by national and international Outsider Artists.

Located at Amstel 51 1018 EJ Amsterdam it is where artists show their inner world to the outside world through outsider art.

== Awards ==
In 2005 the museum won the Dutch Design Prize in the category ‘Exhibition & Experience Design’. In 2007 the museum received an honorable mention for The European Museum of the Year Award, in 2022 it won this same prize.

Location: Schotersingel 2, Haarlem, just north of the Haarlem railway station.
