= Jan Augustini =

Dutch painter

Jan Degelenkamp
- Born: 16 November 1725; Groningen, The Netherlands
- Died: 2 December 1773 (aged 48); Haarlem, Holland, Dutch Republic

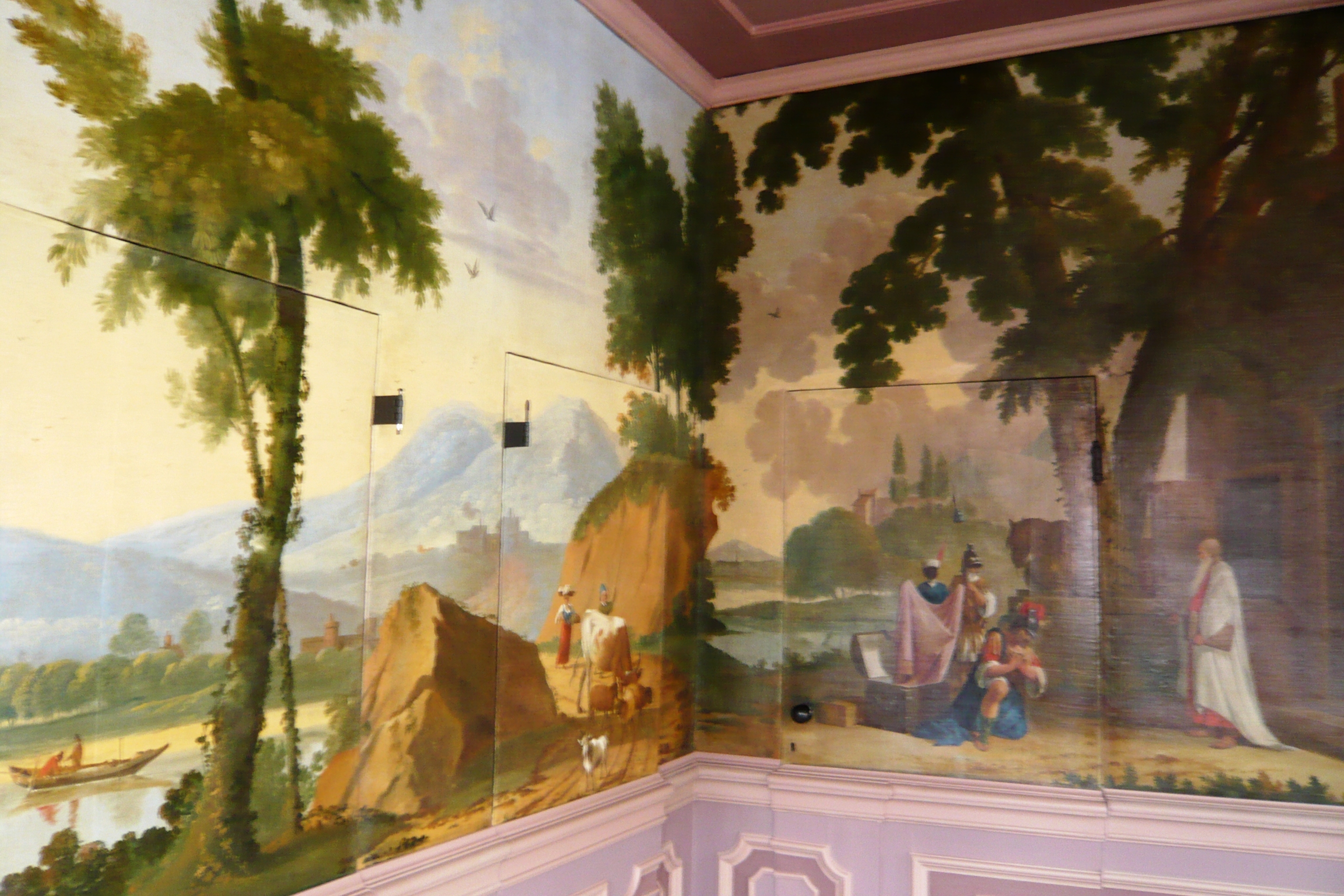
Regent room in Museum van de Geest, a continuous landscape covering three walls, done by Augustini in 1756

Jan Augustini Degelenkamp (16 November 1725 – 2 December 1773) was an 18th-century painter from the Dutch Republic.

== Biography ==
According to the RKD, he was a landscape painter who made large wall decorations, many of which are still installed in the buildings for which they were designed. He was a pupil of Philip van Dijk in The Hague. He started his career working on pictures of flora for botanists, and contributed to the herbarium of the Leiden hortulanus Jacobus Schuurmans Stekhoven. His pupils were his son Jacobus Luberti Augustini, Egbert van Drielst, Hermanus Numan, Gabriël van Rooyen, and Hendrik Tavenier.
