= Gabriël van Rooyen =

Dutch painter and pastellist (1752–1817)

- Self-portrait at a young age. Rijksmuseum
- Born: 19 December 1752; Utrecht
- Died: 16 September 1817 (aged 64); Amsterdam
- Education: Pupil of Jacobus van Rooijen and Jan Augustini

Gabriël van Rooyen (19 December 1752 – 16 September 1817), also spelled van Royen or van Rooijen, was a Dutch painter of wall hangings, pastellist, draughtsman and etcher.

== Life ==
Van Rooyen was born in Utrecht and died in Amsterdam. He was baptised on 22 December 1752., the son of the Utrecht painter of wall hangings Jacobus van Rooijen (1726–1789) and Maria Christina Bossart. His father trained him as a painter.

At the age of eighteen or nineteen he went to Haarlem, where he worked in the wall-hanging factory of Jan Augustini and afterwards for J.B. Brandhof. In his spare time he drew portraits in crayon (pastel). After some time he left for Amsterdam, where he painted wall hangings and again made a few portraits.

In Amsterdam he met the Frisian painter Harmen Wouter Beekkerk, who encouraged him to go with him to Leeuwarden. Beekkerk had taken on the decorative work for the large preparations made there for the ceremonial reception of Prince William V in 1773. When that work was finished, Van Rooyen returned to Amsterdam. Headwinds made the crossing a long one, and on the way he drew the skipper's portrait. The skipper was so pleased with it that he waived the fare and some of what Van Rooyen had consumed on the way.

He worked for two years for the Amsterdam painter of wall hangings Elffers. Afterwards he worked independently and established himself in Amsterdam. On 14 May 1779 he gave notice of marriage (ondertrouw) there to Anna Smeeling, who died in 1811.

== Work ==
Man met gesloten ogen (Man with closed eyes), 1805. Amsterdam Museum

Van Rooyen painted whatever came his way, but above all portraits, mostly in crayon. A painting of 1790 is signed G. van Royen, a pastel of 1796 G. van Rooijen.

Roeland van Eynden and Adriaan van der Willigen wrote in 1817 that he had a masterly command of the effect of light and dark and of colour, and that he painted boldly. According to them he was, even by his own admission, not far enough advanced in the technique of painting, because he had learned too little drawing in his youth; later he found it hard to make up for this. In their judgement he could have become a great master in the manner of Rembrandt if his talent had been better directed. They called him "zeer luimig" ("very whimsical") and wrote that this had no small influence on his way of life and his work. Johannes Immerzeel wrote that he had "eene vlugge hand en een fiksch penseel" ("a quick hand and a vigorous brush").

His painted portraits include that of Didericus Adrianus Walraven, professor at the Athenaeum Illustre in Amsterdam, in the collection of the University of Amsterdam. In 1792 Theodoor Koning made a print of Walraven after a design by Van Rooyen. The Rijksmuseum holds a painted self-portrait and an etching in which he portrayed himself and the draughtsman H. Langeveld. A portrait drawing of Anthonie van den Bosch of 1802 in the same collection is possibly by him. Museum De Lakenhal has had that pastel, a portrait of an unknown man, on loan from Ars Aemula Naturae since 1928. The Amsterdam Museum has the panel Man met gesloten ogen (Man with closed eyes) of 1805, which comes from the Willet-Holthuysen bequest of 1895.

Johannes Cornelis Mertens drew him in black chalk in 1800. In 1809 Jacob Ernst Marcus etched a portrait of Van Rooyen after a drawing by Hendrik Willem Caspari. In Marcus's series of prints Studie-beelden en fragmenten (Study figures and fragments) Van Rooyen can be recognised by the brush stuck in his hat.

== Gallery ==
Portret van Didericus Adrianus Walraven (Portrait of Didericus Adrianus Walraven), etching and engraving by Theodoor Koning after a design by Van Rooyen, 1792. Rijksmuseum

Portret van Gabriel van Rooyen en H. Langeveld (Portrait of Gabriel van Rooyen and H. Langeveld), etching. Rijksmuseum

Portret van Antonie van den Bosch (Portrait of Antonie van den Bosch), 1802, possibly by Van Rooyen. Rijksmuseum

Portrait of Gabriël van Rooyen, drawing by Johannes Cornelis Mertens, 1800. Rijksmuseum
