= Hendrik Tavenier =

Dutch painter

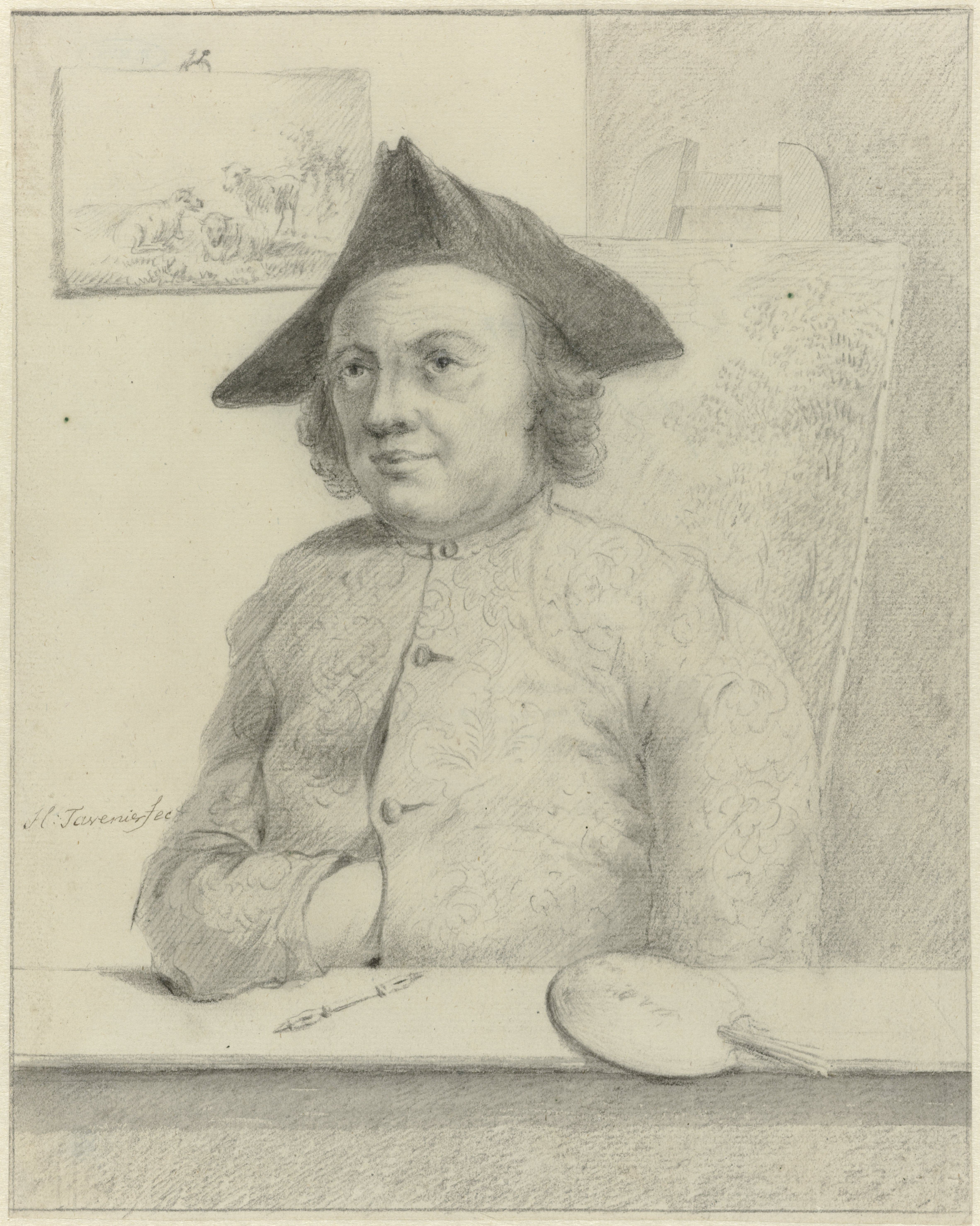
Hendrik Tavenier self-portrait

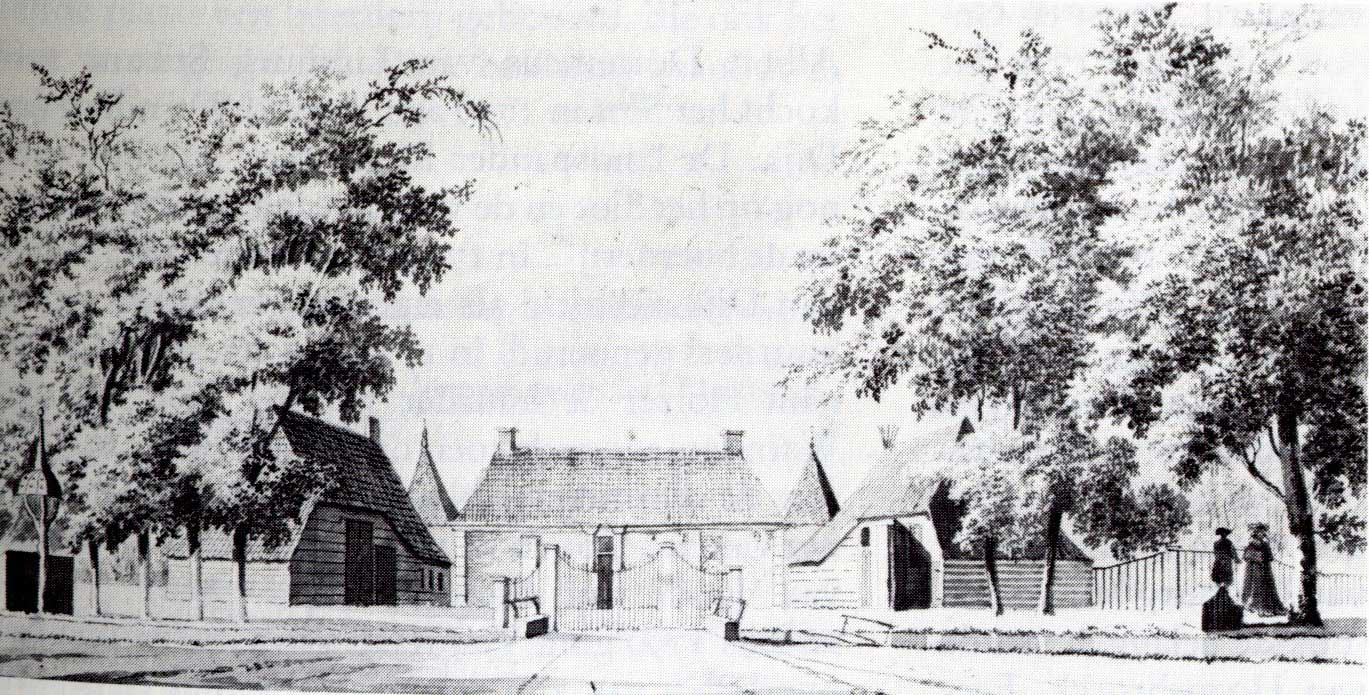
Het Slot at De Oosterboer in 1786

Hendrik Tavenier (1734–1807) was an 18th-century painter from the Dutch Republic.

== Biography ==
He was born and died in Haarlem. According to the RKD he became a member of the Haarlem Guild of St. Luke in 1759. He was a pupil of Jan Augustini in his wallpaper factory, and later made a living in landscape drawings and prints. He is also known for topographical drawings of North Holland, and the North Holland archives have a large selection of drawings and watercolours by his hand.
