= Philip van Dijk =

Dutch painter

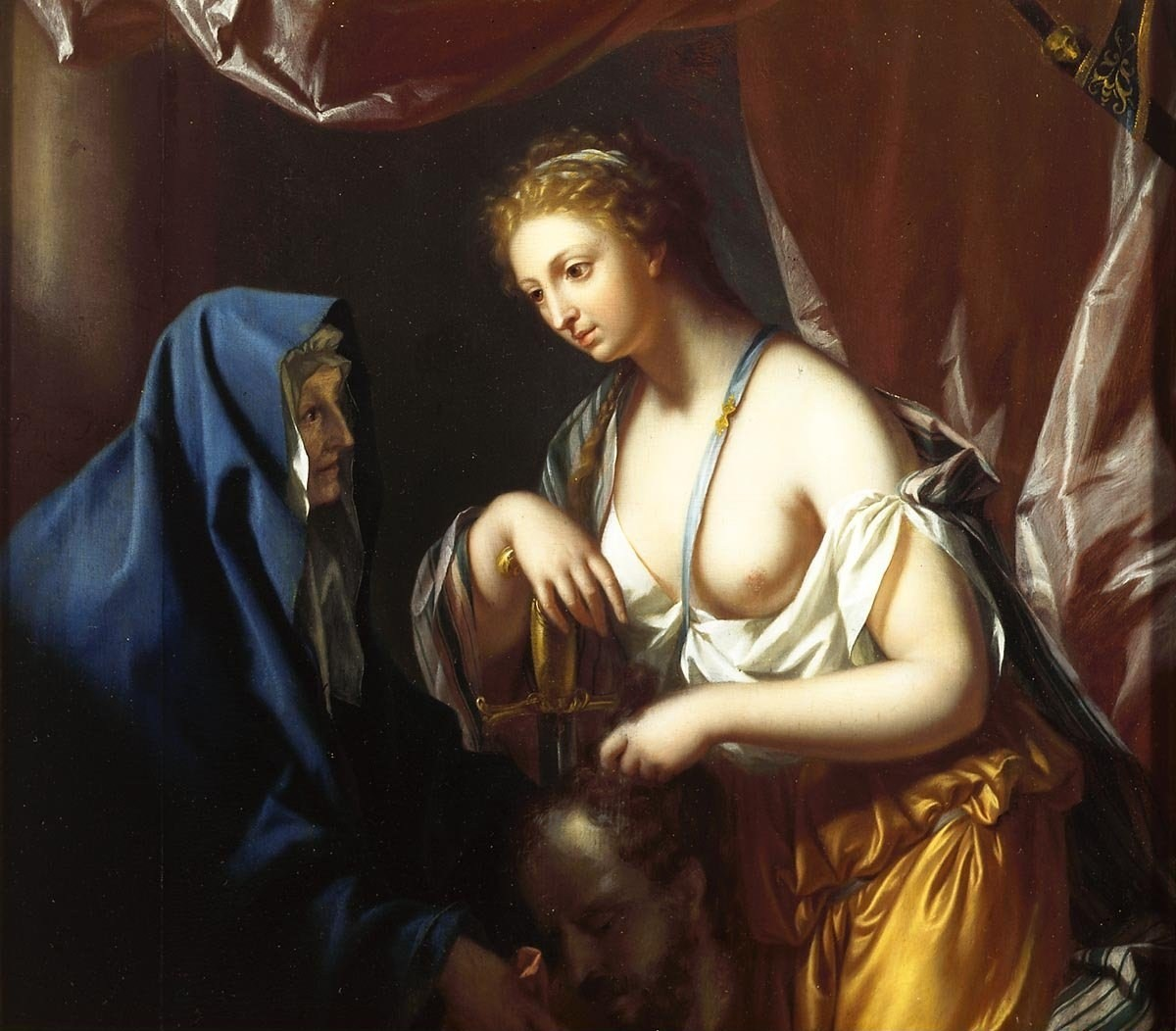
- Judith with the head of Holofernes
- Born: 10 January 1683; Oud-Beijerland
- Died: 2 February 1753 (aged 70); The Hague
- Known for: Painting
- Movement: Baroque

Philip van Dijk (10 January 1683 – 2 February 1753) was an 18th-century painter from the Dutch Republic.

== Biography ==
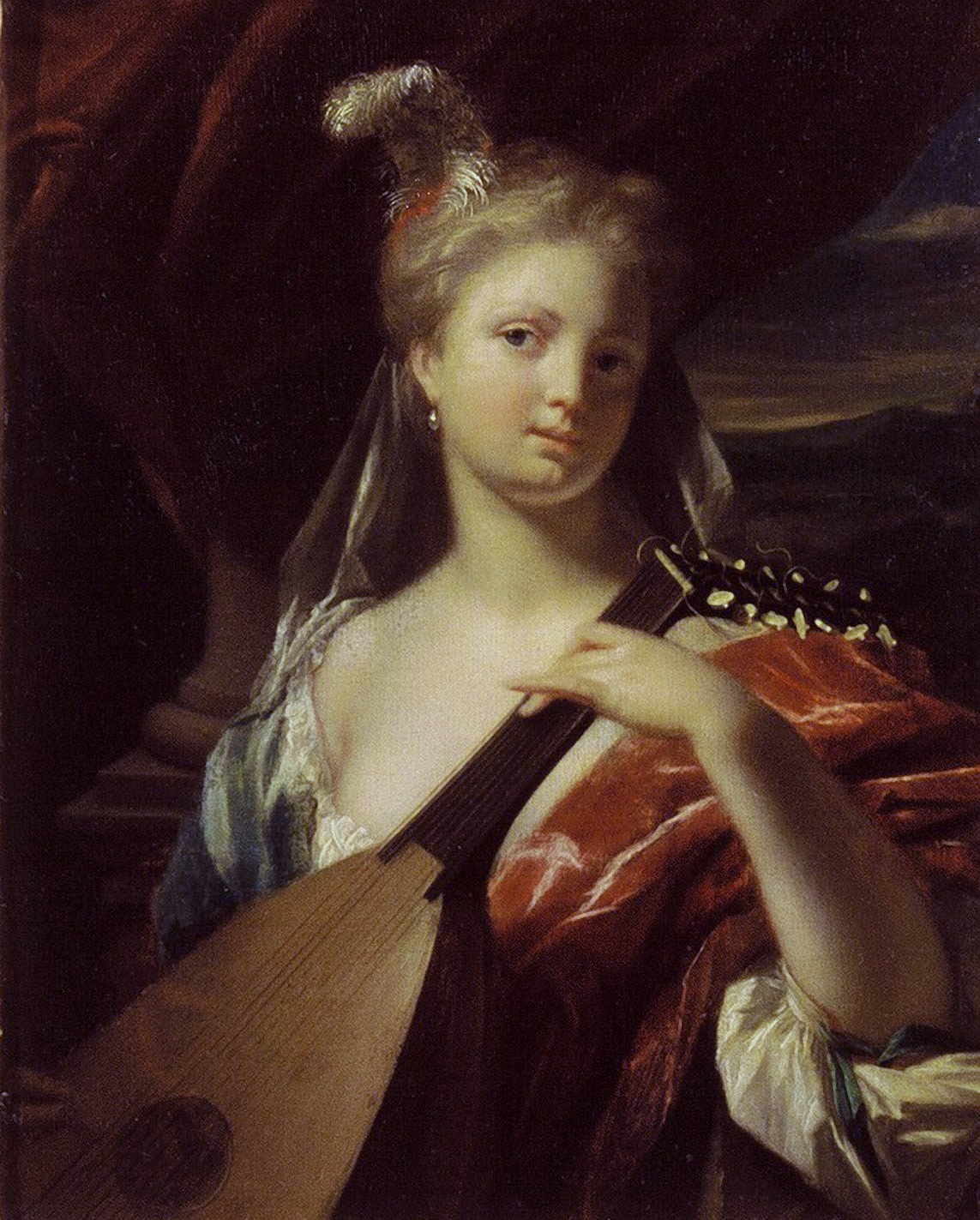
Lute player, used on Dutch 100 guilder note.

According to the RKD, he was a student of Arnold Boonen in Amsterdam, but became a student of Adriaen van der Werff in Rotterdam, where he married in 1708. Later the same year, he became a member of the Guild of St. Luke in Middelburg. In 1718 he became a member of the Confrerie Pictura, where he became a popular painter. Much later he returned to teach at the drawing academy and had various students, including Jan Augustini, Louis de Monie, and Hendrik Pothoven (1725–1807) from 1746. He left the Hague temporarily for 10 years in 1726, when he moved to Kassel to become court painter for William VIII, Landgrave of Hesse-Cassel. In this capacity, he painted Landgravine Marie Louise of Hesse-Kassel and her family. In 1737 he returned to Middelburg to pay back-dues for the Guild there, and in 1750 he is registered as back to the Hague where he became court painter to Marie Louise's son William IV, Prince of Orange.

== Legacy ==
His family portrait paintings hang in many museums located in former residences of the Hesse-Cassel and Orange-Nassau families. His painting of a lute player was used centuries later as a model for the Dutch 100 guilder note.
