= Jacobus Luberti Augustini =

Dutch painter

- Born: April 30, 1748; Haarlem, Netherlands
- Died: August 4, 1822 (aged 74); Haarlem
- Occupation: Painter

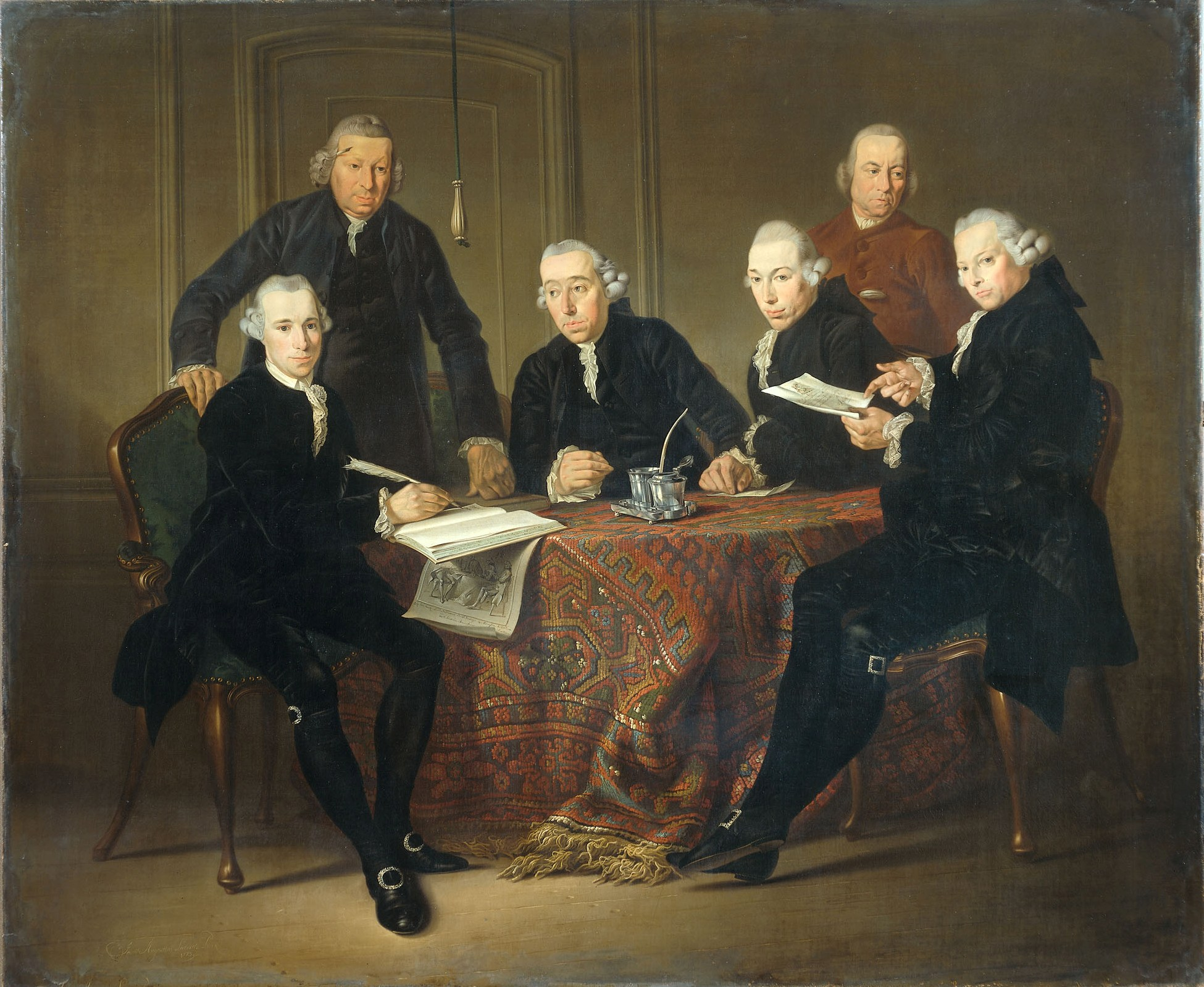
Regents of the Leprozenhuis in Amsterdam in 1773

Jacobus Luberti Augustini (30 April 1748 – 4 August 1822) was an 18th-century painter from the Dutch Republic.

== Biography ==
Augustini was born in Haarlem as the son of the landscape painter Jan Augustini, who made large wall decorations and who taught him to paint. He started his career as a painter of allegorical works, and later stopped when he accepted a position as a tax collector.
When he lost his job due to circumstances beyond his control, Augustini started a small publishing house in Haarlem. Besides allegorical works, he is also known for portraits.
