= Hermanus Fock =

Dutch draughtsman and etcher (1766–1822)

- Self-portrait, portrait miniature, between 1786 and 1810
- Born: 1 November 1766; Amsterdam
- Died: Summer 1822 (aged 55)

Hermanus Fock (1 November 1766 – summer 1822 (Note: RKD gives 27 September 1822 in Franeker as the date and place of death, on the authority of Saur's Allgemeines Künstlerlexikon.)), also known as Harmannus Fock, was a Dutch draughtsman, etcher and painter. He taught drawing at the Athenaeum Illustre in Franeker and made a series of small satirical prints on Napoleon's defeat in the Russian campaign.

== Life ==
Fock at the age of 14, by Anthonie Andriessen, red chalk, 1780. Rijksmuseum

He was born in Amsterdam. His father, Johannes Fock, was a surgeon (chirurgijn). In 1793 Fock acquired burgher rights in Amsterdam. He taught drawing in Amsterdam and was one of the founders of the Amsterdam drawing society Kunst zij ons doel (Art be our aim).

In 1798 Fock worked for, or supplied, the painting, wallpaper and printing works of the Vaderlandsche Maatschappij in Hoorn. He later became drawing master at the Athenaeum Illustre in Franeker; by 1820 he had held that post for several years.

On 17 February 1823, drawings, studies and etched copper plates that he had left were auctioned in Amsterdam.

== Work ==
Fock drew, etched and painted landscapes. He also made portraits and miniatures, and he restored paintings.

At the Exhibition of Living Masters in Amsterdam he showed a moonlight scene in 1813, eight small etched landscapes in 1814 and a drawing (prentteekening) of an Arcadian landscape in 1818. The 1818 catalogue gives Franeker as his place of residence.

=== Prints ===
His etchings of small landscapes appeared in series, such as twelve small landscapes with cattle and figures, and several series of six sheets, one of them with dune and other landscapes around Haarlem, including the ruins of Brederode Castle. The title sheet of one of these series bears the year 1801 and a dedication to a friend who loved art.

After Fock's death, a set of more than two hundred of his etchings was sold for 69 guilders at the auction of the art left by C.D. Hodges in Amsterdam. According to Kramm, this was Fock's own portfolio of proofs and altered impressions, so it does not follow that he etched that many different prints.

Fock drew the prints for Van Woensel's Beschouwing van Rusland (View of Russia; Haarlem, 1804). Two sheets in that book with many figures, Wintervermaaken (Winter amusements) and Zomervermaaken der St.-Petersburgers (Summer amusements of the people of Saint Petersburg), were engraved by someone else after his drawings. For A. Cramer's De berggeest, of het steenen bruidsbed (The mountain spirit, or the stone bridal bed; Amsterdam, 1815), he designed and made the title print.

=== Satirical prints ===
Fock made a series of small satirical prints on Napoleon's defeat in the Russian campaign: six according to Kramm, seven according to Veth. The prints are etched in outline and full of explanatory inscriptions. They were not published but passed around privately, and the title sheet, a coat of arms with broken crowns and a dead eagle gnawed by rats, bears the year 1813. Cornelis Veth saw good-natured mockery without much rancour in the series, and considered Fock's other etchings much finer.

== Works in collections ==
His self-portrait, a miniature on ivory, was in the collection of the Rijksmuseum in 2026. In 1961 the Leiden print room held three landscape drawings by him in chalk and India ink, and the Atlas Van Stolk in Rotterdam held a drawing. In 1981, according to Scheen, there was a crayon drawing of the Amstelveenseweg from 1794 in the Amsterdam municipal archives, there were portrait drawings in the Rijksprentenkabinet, drawings in the Haarlem municipal archives, and drawings in Museum Boijmans Van Beuningen, including a mussel stall at night.

== Gallery ==
Napoleon krijgt de kous op de kop (Napoleon gets the stocking over his head), 1812–1813. Rijksmuseum

Een Franse soldaat probeert zijn tong te ontdooien aan een lamp (A French soldier tries to thaw his tongue on a lamp), 1813. Rijksmuseum

Drie Franse nederlagen (Three French defeats), 1812–1813. Rijksmuseum

Visitekaart van Hermanus Fock (Visiting card of Hermanus Fock), 1781–1822. Rijksmuseum

Winterlandschap met schaatsers (Winter landscape with skaters), 1781–1822. Rijksmuseum

Bomen aan de Amstelveense Weg (Trees on the Amstelveense Weg), 1776–1822. Rijksmuseum

Man op klompen en met mand op de rug (Man in clogs with a basket on his back), 1781–1822. Rijksmuseum

Bij Overveen (Near Overveen), 1795–1805. Noord-Hollands Archief

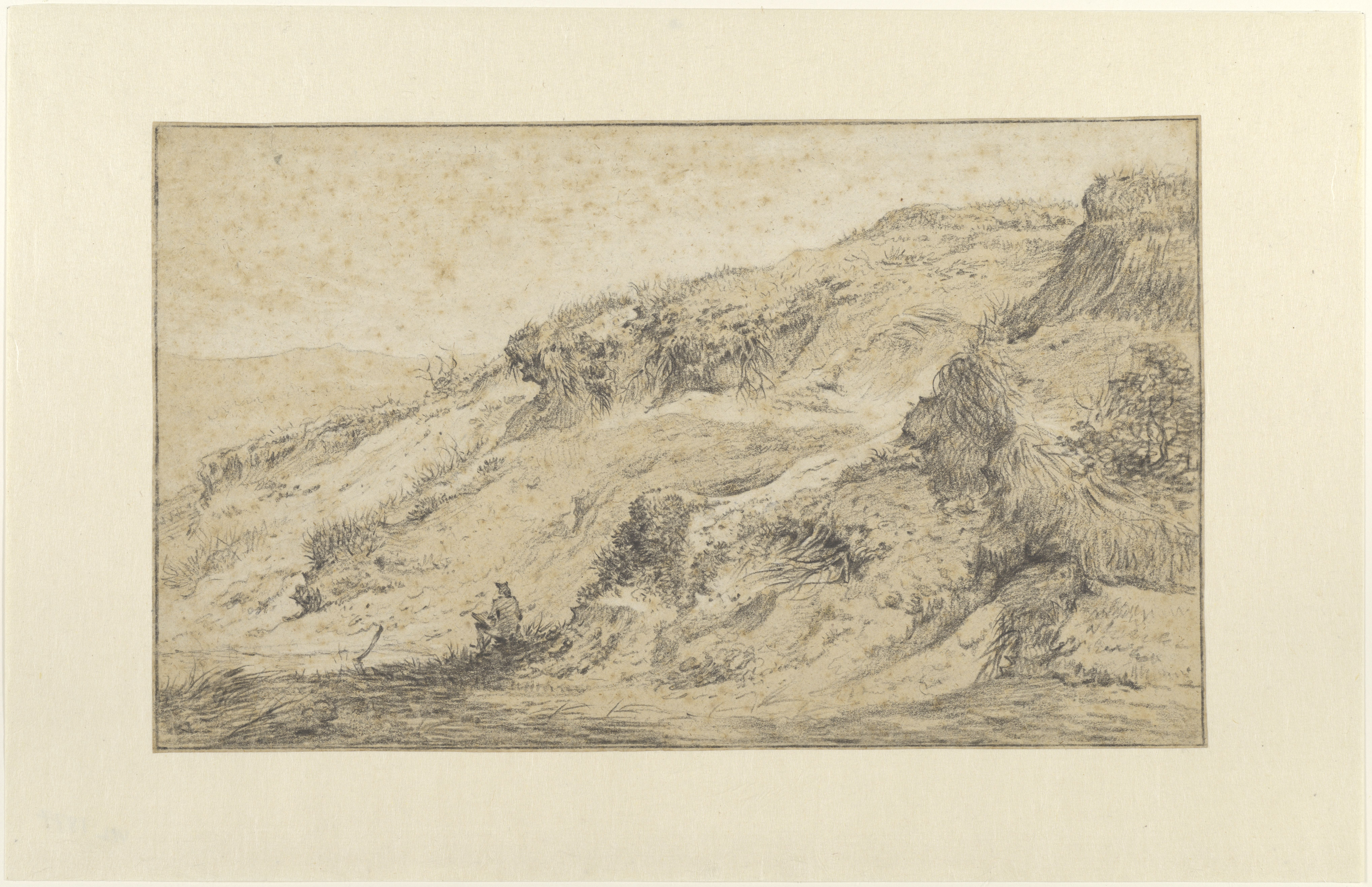
Duinlandschap met een tekenaar (Dune landscape with a draughtsman), circa 1800. Musea Brugge

Gedenkteken voor de watersnood van 1809 (Memorial of the flood of 1809), etched and engraved by Abraham Lion Zeelander after a drawing by Fock, 1809. Rijksmuseum
