= Albertus Brondgeest =

Dutch painter

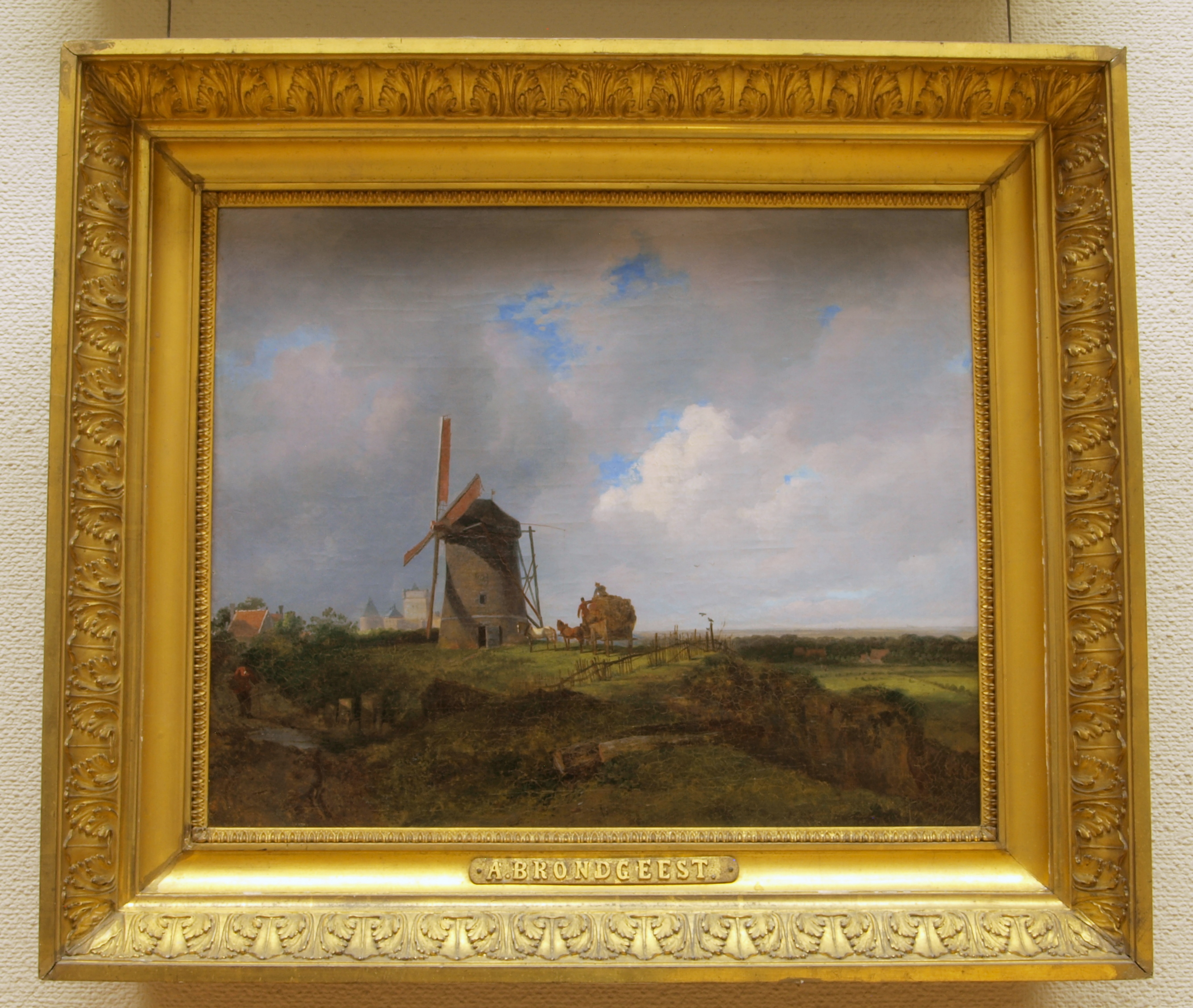
Zomer (Summer), a landscape near Gildehaus. Oil on canvas.

Albertus Brondgeest (Amsterdam, 2 October 1786 – Amsterdam, 30 July 1849) was a Dutch art trader, drawer and painter, primarily known for his landscapes. He was a pupil of Pieter Gerardus van Os, but also studied with Wouter Johannes van Troostwijk.

== Life ==
Brondgeest collected and studied art from the 17th century and got his inspiration from those works. His paintings were not his primary source of income, but he was a trader and came from a reasonably wealthy family, which was at first not very pleased with the artistic ambitions of young Albertus. In 1817 he opened his own art trade, which he made good business with. He shared his business at least for a while with Ferdinand Bol. His business went so well, that he was able to buy a country house, "Vlietzorg". Besides that he held several governance positions, which made him a wealthy and influential person. He passed his time in artistic circles, also during his study trips abroad (Germany, France and England).

In 1828, he married Anna Barbara Ratelband and had three sons and three daughters with her.

== Work ==
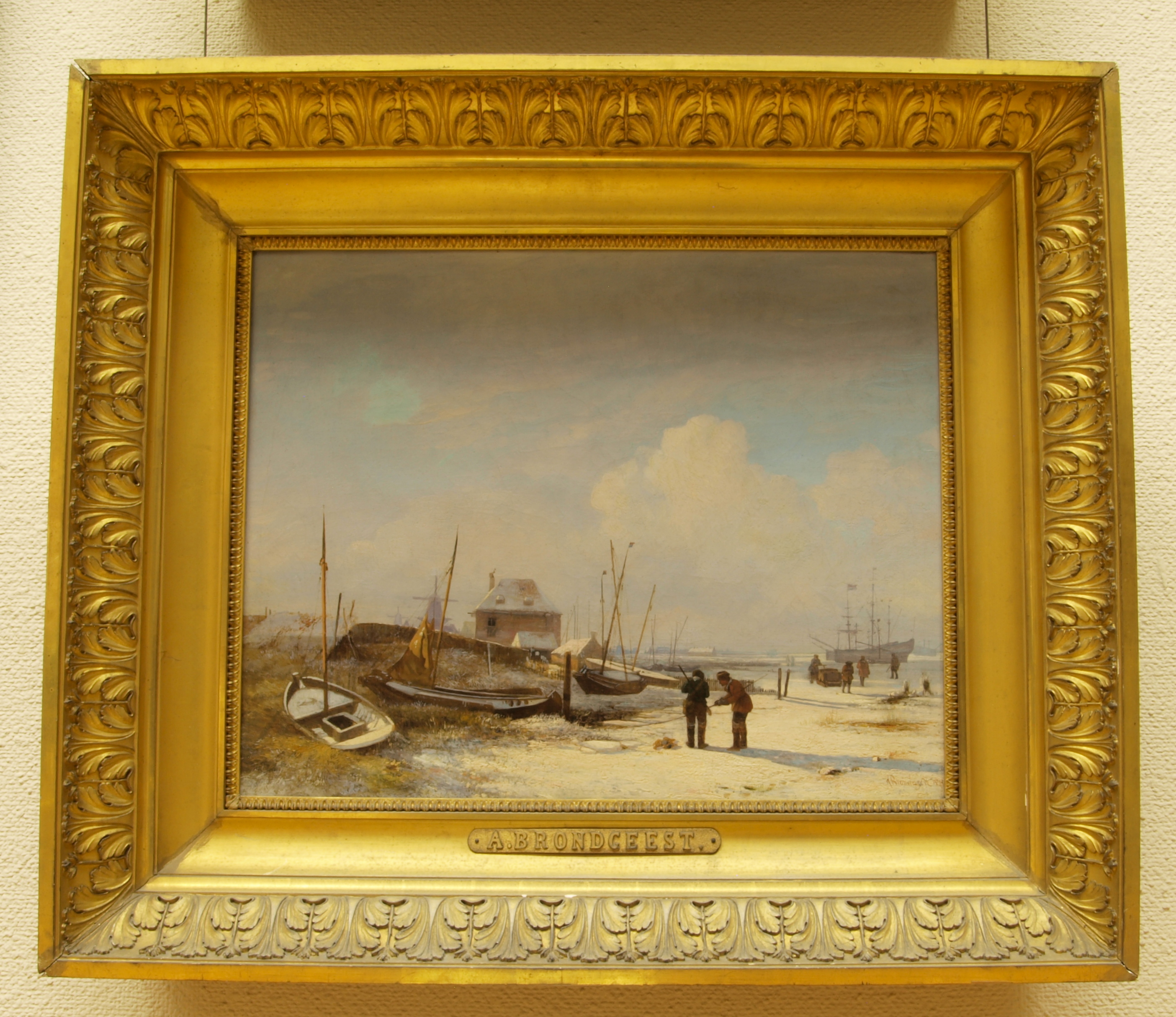
Het IJ voor Amsterdam in de Winter (1823; oil on cavas)

At a young age, interested in drawing, Brondgeest received guidance of Van Os (a cattle and landscape painter who recently moved to Amsterdam), who later became his friend. After a few years of his education, he studied the landscapes of Jan Hulswit, which further inspired him. While early works by Brondgeest have been produced with water-based paint, he switched in 1809 on the advice of his friend and tutor Van Troostwijk to oil-based paint, with success. Thanks to his collections and his art trade, he had a relatively unrestricted access to art from that period, and could study this extensively, which he happily did. He studied the 17th-century master Rembrandt van Rijn and Italian and German masters. He also was able to extend his studies because of his involvement in art auctions of several important print collections.

Every year Brondgeest spent several weeks in natural environments to paint landscapes. When later in his life he had less time because of his thriving business, he painted less and he switched to river views (because he couldn't take the time any longer to visit the landscapes), which also received wide recognition and appreciation. However, he also received recognition for his drawings, besides of his paintings. Some of his work is on display in the Teylers Museum in Haarlem.

== Recognition ==
Brondgeest submitted paintings to several exhibitions which were accepted on multiple occasions, at least from 1813 until 1818. In 1814 Brondgeest won a golden medal by the Society Felix Meritis in Amsterdam with his painting Een gezigt binnen eene Nederlandsche stad, bij zonnedaglicht, met behoorlijke stoffaadje (A view within a Dutch city, at sunlight, with a significant "stoffaadje"). In 1839 he was recognized by the city government of The Hague with a silver medal for his submission to an exhibition there. He was a member of the Amsterdam drawing society Zonder Wet of Spreuk (without law or motto). He was a member of the Fourth Class of the Koninklijk Nederlandsch Instituut (Royal Dutch Institute) from 1816 onwards and of the Koninklijke Academie voor Beeldende Kunsten Amsterdam (Royal Academy of Visual Arts Amsterdam) and the Koninklijke Academie te Antwerpen (Royal Academy of Antwerp).
