= Henry (given name) =

- King Henry VIII, arguably the best-known Henry in history.
- Pronunciation: /ˈhɛn.ri/
- Gender: Male
- Name day: July 13

Origin
- Origin: English, French, German
- Meaning: Home ruler Ruler of (the) home Ruler of the homeland

Other names
- Related names: Heinrich, Heinz, Henrich, Hinrich, Hinnerk, Henning, Emerich, Emmerich (German); Henrik, Henric (Scandinavian); Henri, Aymeric (French); Enrique, Americo (Spanish); Enrico, Ennio, Amerigo (Italian); Imre (Hungarian); Hein, Hendrik, Hendric, Henk (Dutch); Henrique (Portuguese); Henryk (Polish); Jindřich (Czech); Hynek (Czech); Genri, Genrikh (Russian); Enzo (Italian); Heinrici, Henrici, Henricus (Latin); Ερρίκος (Errikos), (Greek); Anry (Armenian); Henrijs, Ints, Ingus, Inguss, Indriķis, Indulis, Anrijs (Latvian); Henrikas (Lithuanian); Heiki, Indrek, Hindrek, Enn, Enno (Estonian); Nicknames: Harry; Hank; Hal; Hankie; Feminine forms: Henrietta; Harriet

Henry is a masculine given name derived from Old French Henri or Henry, which is derived from the Old Frankish name Heimeric, from Common Germanic “Haimarīks” (from *haima- "home" and *rīk- "ruler"). In Old High German, the name was conflated with the name Haginrich (from hagin "enclosure" and rich "ruler") to form Heinrich.

The Old High German name is recorded from the 8th century, in the variants Haimirich, Haimerich, Heimerich, Hemirih. Harry, its English short form, was considered the "spoken form" of Henry in medieval England. Most English kings named Henry were called Harry. The name became so popular in England that the phrase "Tom, Dick, and Harry" began to be used to refer to men in general. The most common English feminine forms of the name are Harriet and Henrietta. An Italian variant descended from the Old High German name, Amerigo, was the source from which the continents of the Americas were named.

It has been a consistently popular name in English-speaking countries for centuries. It has also ranked among the top 100 most popular names used for men born in the Canada, United States, the United Kingdom, Ireland, Australia and New Zealand, and also in European countries such as Germany, Norway, Sweden, and Switzerland. Henry has been among the 10 most popular names for boys in Australia since 2017; in the United States since 2020; in England and Wales in 2021 and again in 2023. It was the 46th most common name for boys and men in the United States in the 1990 census, and has ranked among the ten most popular names for American newborn boys since 2020. Henry was the 23rd most popular name among Harvard University students in 2025. The name was more popular for newborn boys who went on to attend Harvard than it was for newborn American boys among the general population of the United States during the years the future Harvard students were born. Harry, its short form, has been among the top 100 names in the United Kingdom since 1994 and among the top 10 names at different times between 2000 and 2021, and among the top 100 names in Ireland since the 1990s and among the top 10 names at different times between 2011 and 2020. It is also in use as a surname.

== Masculine variants ==
In the High Middle Ages, the name was Latinized as Henricus. It was a royal name in Germany, France, and England throughout the high medieval period (Henry I of Germany, Henry I of England, Henry I of France) and widely used as a given name; as a consequence, many regional variants developed in the languages of Western and Central Europe.

Within German, Low German, Frisian, and Dutch, numerous diminutives and abbreviated forms exist, including Low German, Dutch and Frisian Heike, Heiko; Dutch Hein, Heintje; and German Heiner, Heinz.

The original diphthong was lost in Dutch Hendrik (hypocoristics Henk, Hennie, Rik) and Scandinavian Henrik (whence Henning).

Eastern European languages developed native forms during the medieval period under the influence of German and the Scandinavian languages; hence Polish Henryk; Czech Jindřich, Hynek; Hungarian, Slovene, and Serbo-Croatian Henrik; Finnish Henrikki (hypocoristic Heikki); and Lithuanian Henrikas or Herkus.

The Old French form Henri and Middle French form Henry became popular in the British Isles, adopted into Middle English as Harry, Herry. Herry was adopted into Welsh as Perry; into Irish as Annraoi, Anraí, and Einrí; and into Scottish Gaelic as Eanraig, Eanruig.

In Southern Europe, variants without the initial "H" include Italian Arrigo, Enrico, and Enzo; Catalan language and Occitan Enric; and Spanish Enrique (whence Basque Endika).

A separate variant, which may have originated with the Old High German name Haimirich but was possibly conflated with the names Ermenrich (first element ermen "whole") or Amalric (first element amal "vigour, bravery"), is Emmerich. Emmerich is the origin of a separate suite of variant names used across Western and Central Europe, although these never rose to the ubiquity of the variants of Henry: English Emery, Amery, Emory; French Émeric, Aymeric; Hungarian Imre, Imrus; Slovak Imrich; Italian Amerigo; and Iberian (Portuguese, Spanish, Galician) Américo.

== Feminine variants ==
Several variants of Heinrich have given rise to derived feminine given names. Low German Henrik, Hendrik gave rise to Henrike, Hendrike, Hendrikje, Hendrina, Henrika and others, Low German Heiko to Heike, Italian Enrico gave rise to Enrica, Spanish Enrique to Enriqueta, Enriquetta, Enriquette. French Henri gave rise to Henriette, Henrietta, further modified to Enrieta, Enrietta, English Harry to Harriet, Harriett, Harrietta, Harriette, hypocorisms Hattie, Hatty, Hettie, Etta, Ettie; various other hypocorisms include Hena, Henna, Henah, Heni, Henia, Henny, Henya, Henka, Dutch Jet, Jett, Jetta, Jette, Ina. In Polish Henryka, Henia, Heniusia, Henka, Henryczka, Henrysia, Rysia are attested. The hypocorisms Rika, Rike etc. may be from this or other names with the second element -ric. Spanish and Portuguese América from the Emmerich variant Amérigo .

== Surnames ==
Harrison, Henson, Harris, Heaney (Irish surname), Fitzhenry (Irish Hiberno-Norman surname), Heinz (German surname), Enríquez (Spanish surname), Henriques (Portuguese surname), Heney, Henney, Hendrick, Hendricks, Hinrichs, Hendrickx, Hendriks, Hendrikx, Hendrix, Hendryx, Henderson, Hendrickson, and Henderickson.

== In different languages ==
- Albanian: Enrik, Henri
- Arabic: هنري (Hinri)
- Afrikaans: Hendrik
- Alemmanic: Hene, Heini, Heiri
- Amharic: ሄንሪ (Hēnirī)
- Armenian: Հենրի (Henri)
- Basque: Endika
- Bavarian: Heini, Heiner
- Belarusian: Henryk
- Breton: Herri
- Bulgarian: Хенри (Henri)
- Catalan: Enric
- Chinese (Mandarin): 亨利 (Hēnglì)
- Czech: Jindra, Jindřich, Hynek
- Danish: Henrik, Henrick, Hendrich, Henderich,
- Dutch: Henk, Henrik, Henrick, Hendrich, Hendrik, Hendrick, Henderick
- English: Henry, Hendrick, Hennie, Hendrie, Henderick, Henrie, Henny, Hen, Han, Hannie, Hanny, Hendry, Henk, Hein, Hank, Hankie, Heinz Hanky, Harry, Harrie, Hal, Handrick, Handerick, Rick, Ricky, Rickie, Rich, Henderson, Hendrickson, Henderickson, Henriette, Henrietta, Henrique, Hatty, Heinrich, Heinnie, Heinny, Hein, Ettie, Harriet, Harriette, Harrietta, Henky, Henkie, Henriet, Henrick, Henrich, Heina, Heindrick, Heinderick, Hendrich, Hetty, Hattie, Henderich, Heinderich, Hettie, Henricus, Henriquetta Henka, Henya, Hendricka, Hendericka, Henah, Heinderickhuson Hendricks, Hendericks, Henna, Hendrix, Henderix, Etta, Ette, Hendy, Hendie, Rijk, Henson, Hennah, Harrison, Harris, Henris, Henrison, Henrickus, Henrickas, Henning,
- Estonian: Heiki, Hindrek, Indrek, Henri, Henrai, Henraiv, Raivo
- Faroese: Heindrikur, Heinrikur
- Finnish: Henri, Henrik, Heikki
- French: Henri, Henry
- Frisian: Hindrik
- Galician: Henrique, Enrique
- Georgian: ჰენრი (Henri), ანრი (Anri)
- German: Heinrich, Henrich, Hinrich, Henrick, Heinz, Henry, Henri
- Greek: Ερρίκος (Errikos)
- Hawaiian: Hanalē, Henelē
- Hebrew: הנרי (Henri)
- Hungarian: Henrik
- Icelandic: Hinrik, Henrý
- Indonesian: Hendrik, Henri, Henry
- Irish: Hanraí, Hamhrí, Anraí, Éinrí
- Italian: Enrico, Arrigo
- Japanese: ヘンリー (Henrī)
- Korean: 헨리 (Henli)
- Latin: Henricus, Henderickus, Hendrickus, Hendrikus,
- Latvian: Henrijs, Henriks, Heinrihs, Henrihs, Hinrihs, Indriķis, Inds, Ints, Ingus, Inguss, Anrijs, Anrī
- Lithuanian: Henris, Henrikas
- Macedonian: Хенри (Henri)
- Maltese: Ħenri
- Māori: Henare
- Norwegian: Henry, Henrik
- Northern Sami: Heandarat
- Polish: Henryk
- Portuguese: Henrique
- Romanian: Henric
- Russian: Генри (Genri), Генрих (Genrikh), Хенри (Henri), Хенрик (Henrik)
- Samoan: Enele
- Scots: Hendry
- Scottish Gaelic: Eanraig
- Serbo-Croatian: Хенри (Henri), Henrik
- Slovak: Henrich
- Slovene: Henrik
- Spanish: Enrique
- Swedish: Henry, Henrik, Henrick
- Tongan: Heneli
- Thai: เฮนรี่ (eḥnrī̀)
- Ukrainian: Генріх (Henrikh)
- Vietnamese: Hieu – Hu
- Welsh: Henry, Harri, Herri

== People with the given name ==
=== Royalty ===
- Henry I (disambiguation)
- Henry II (disambiguation)
- Henry III (disambiguation)
- Henry IV (disambiguation)
- Henry V (disambiguation)
- Henry VI (disambiguation)
- Henry VII (disambiguation)
- Henry VIII (disambiguation)
- Henry IX (disambiguation)
- Henry X (disambiguation)
- Henry XI (disambiguation)

Byzantine Emperor

- Henry of Flanders, Byzantine emperor, one of the principal commanders of Bulgarian–Latin wars, Battle of Philippopolis (1208) and Battle of the Rhyndacus (1211)

Holy Roman Emperors

- Henry II, Holy Roman Emperor
- Henry III, Holy Roman Emperor
- Henry IV, Holy Roman Emperor
- Henry V, Holy Roman Emperor
- Henry VI, Holy Roman Emperor
- Henry VII, Holy Roman Emperor

Kings of England

- Henry I of England
- Henry II of England
- Henry III of England
- Henry IV of England, one of the principal commanders of the Hundred Years' War
- Henry V of England, one of the principal commanders of the Battle of Agincourt
- Henry VI of England
- Henry VII of England, one of the principal commanders of the Battle of Bosworth Field and the Wars of the Roses
- Henry VIII of England, one of the principal commanders of the Italian War of 1542–1546 and the Rough Wooing, principal leader of Dissolution of the monasteries

Junior King of England

- Henry the Young King

King of East Francia

- Henry the Fowler (876–936)

Kings of France

- Henry I of France, one of the principal commanders of Battle of Mortemer and Battle of Val-ès-Dunes
- Henry II of France, one of the principal commanders of Italian War of 1551–1559 and Anglo-French War of 1557–1559

Kings of Castile

- Henry I of Castile
- Henry II of Castile, one of the principal commanders of Battle of Nájera and Battle of Montiel
- Henry III of Castile, one of the principal commanders of Battle of Collejares
- Henry IV of Castile, one of the principal commanders of Second Battle of Olmedo

King of Portugal

- Henry, King of Portugal, king of Portugal and a cardinal of the Catholic Church

Others

- Prince Harry (born 1984), British prince and military officer
- Henry the Bearded (c. 1165/70–1238), High Duke of Poland
- Henry II the Pious, Duke of Silesia at Wrocław and Duke of Kraków, High Duke of all Poland, and Duke of Southern Greater Poland
- Henry Stuart, Lord Darnley (1545–1567), king consort of Scotland
- Henry Frederick, Prince of Wales (1594–1612)
- Frederick Henry, Prince of Orange (1584–1647), Stadtholder of Holland, one of the principal commanders of the Dutch Revolt
- Henry Julius, Duke of Brunswick-Lüneburg (1564–1614)
- Prince Henry, Duke of Gloucester, third son and fourth child of King George V and Queen Mary, Governor-General of Australia from 1945 to 1947
- Henry (son of Edward I)
- Henry, Duke of Villena, Grand Master of the Order of Santiago
- Henry the Lion, Duke of Saxony and Duke of Bavaria, one of the principal commanders of the Second Crusade, Wendish Crusade, and Battle of Verchen

=== Religious figures ===
- Henry (bishop of Finland) (c. 1100–1156)
- Henry Bretislaus, member of the Přemyslid dynasty, Bishop of Prague from 1182, then Duke of Bohemia as "Bretislaus III"
- Henry Compton (bishop) (c. 1632–1713), Bishop of London during the Glorious Revolution
- Henry B. Eyring (born 1933), American religious leader
- Henry Hochheimer (1818–1912), German-American rabbi
- Henry J. Messing (1847–1913), German-American rabbi
- Henry Oldenburg, German theologian, diplomat, natural philosopher, and creator of scientific peer review, one of the foremost intelligencers of Europe of the seventeenth century
- Henry Benedict Stuart (1725–1807), Cardinal-Bishop of Ostia and Velletri and Dean of the College of Cardinals
- Henry Zdik, Bishop of Olomouc, one of the principal commanders of the Wendish Crusade

=== Nobility ===
- Henry de Audley (1175–1246), English baron
- Henry Bathurst, 3rd Earl Bathurst (1762–1834)
- Henry de Bohun, medieval knight killed by King Robert I of Scotland
- Henry Borwin II, Lord of Mecklenburg
- Henry Brooke, 11th Baron Cobham
- Henry Bulwer, 1st Baron Dalling and Bulwer
- Henry Carey, 1st Baron Hunsdon (1526–1596)
- Henry Dandolo (1107–1205), 41st Doge of Venice, one of the principal commanders of the Fourth Crusade, Battle of Adrianople (1205), Sack of Constantinople, Siege of Constantinople (1203) and Byzantine–Venetian war of 1171
- Henry of Grosmont, 1st Duke of Lancaster (c. 1310–1361), member of the English royal family, diplomat, politician, and soldier, one of the principal commanders of the Hundred Years' War (1337–1360), Battle of Bergerac, Battle of Auberoche and Lancaster's chevauchée of 1346
- Henry Hardinge, 1st Viscount Hardinge (1785–1856), British Army officer and politician
- Henry Light (1782/3–1870), Third governor of British Guiana
- Henry Hotspur Percy, late-medieval English nobleman, one of the principal commanders of the Battle of Homildon Hill, Battle of Otterburn and Battle of Shrewsbury
- Henry Pierrepont, 1st Marquess of Dorchester
- Henry Mordaunt, 2nd Earl of Peterborough
- Henry de Nassau, Lord Overkirk, Dutch nobleman and military general
- Henry Wriothesley, 3rd Earl of Southampton (1573–1624)

=== Presidents and prime ministers ===
- Herbert Henry Asquith, Prime minister of Great Britain, one of the principal commanders of World War I
- Henry Campbell-Bannerman, British statesman and Liberal Party politician who served as Prime Minister of the United Kingdom
- Henry Pelham, British Whig statesman, who served as Prime Minister of Great Britain from 1743 until his death, one of the principal commanders of the War of the Austrian Succession and War of Jenkins' Ear
- Henry John Temple, 3rd Viscount Palmerston, British statesman who served twice as Prime Minister in the mid-19th century, one of the principal commanders of the Crimean War
- Henry A. Wallace, American politician, journalist, and farmer who served as the 33rd Vice President of the United States, the 11th United States Secretary of Agriculture and the 10th United States Secretary of Commerce

=== Wartime figures and military leaders ===
- Henry Athukorale (1930–2019), Sri Lankan Sinhala army officer
- Henry Bagenal (c. 1556–1598), marshal of the Royal Irish Army, one of the principal commanders of the Irish Nine Years' War and Battle of the Yellow Ford
- Henry Washington Benham, American general and civil engineer, one of the principal commanders of Battle of Secessionville
- Henry "Harry" Chauvel, senior officer of the Australian Imperial Force during World War I, one of the principal commanders of Sinai and Palestine campaign, Battle of Romani, Battle of Magdhaba, Battle of Beersheba (1917), Battle of Sharon, Capture of Damascus and Pursuit to Haritan
- Henry Clay Jr., American politician and soldier from Kentucky, one of the principal commanders of Mexican-American War and Battle of Buena Vista
- Henry Crerar, senior officer of the Canadian Army who became the country's "leading field commander" in World War II, where he commanded the First Canadian Army, one of the principal commanders of the Battle of the Scheldt
- Henry Docwra, 1st Baron Docwra of Culmore, English-born soldier and statesman in 17th-century Ireland, founder of the city of Derry, one of the principal commanders of the Irish Nine Years' War
- Henry Every (born c. 1653), British pirate
- Henry Gurney, British colonial administrator, one of the principal commanders of the Malayan Emergency
- Henry Ruhl Guss (1825–1907), Union Army brevet Major General
- Henry Hawley, British army officer who served in the wars of the first half of the 18th century, one of the principal commanders of the Battle of Falkirk Muir and Jacobite rising of 1745
- Henry Kent Hewitt, United States Navy commander of amphibious operations in north Africa and southern Europe through World War II, one of the principal commanders of Operation Torch, Naval Battle of Casablanca, Battle of Gela (1943) and Operation Dragoon
- Roscoe Henry Hillenkoetter, third director of the post–World War II United States Central Intelligence Group (CIG), the third Director of Central Intelligence (DCI), and the first director of the Central Intelligence Agency created by the National Security Act of 1947
- Henry Horne, 1st Baron Horne (1861–1929), British military officer during World War I, one of the principal commanders of the Battle of Arras (1917) and Battle of Cambrai (1918)
- Henry Jackson, Royal Navy officer, one of the principal commanders of the U-boat Campaign (World War I)
- Henry C. Kellers (1874–1954), American lieutenant commander
- Henry Kellgren (1886–1954), Swedish Army lieutenant general
- Henry Kissinger (1923–2023), German-born American politician, one of the principal commanders of Operation Freedom Deal and Cambodian Civil War
- Henry Louis Larsen (1890–1962), United States Marine Corps general, Governor of American Samoa and Governor of Guam
- Henry Leach, British Royal Army officer, one of the principal commanders of Falklands War
- Henry Lukin, South African military commander
- Henry Morris Naglee (1815–1886), Union Army brigadier general
- Henry Perera (1930–2009), admiral and Commander of the Sri Lanka Navy from 1979 to 1983
- Henry Rathbone (1837–1911), American military officer and diplomat present during the assassination of Abraham Lincoln
- Henry Rawlinson, 1st Baron Rawlinson (1864–1925), British General, commander of British Indian Army, one of the principal commanders of Battle of Rooiwal, Battle of Amiens (1918), Battle of the Somme, Second Battle of the Somme and Battle of St Quentin Canal
- Henry Jenner Scobell, British military leader who served as the last officer in command of Cape Colony before the formation of the Union of South Africa, one of the principal commanders of the Battle of Groenkloof
- William Henry Hudson Southerland (1852–1933), American rear admiral, one of the principal commanders of the United States occupation of Nicaragua
- Henry Tandey, English soldier, most highly decorated private of World War I who supposedly spared Adolf Hitler's life during the war, recipient of the Victoria Cross for actions during the First World War
- Henry Hugh Tudor, British soldier and officer during the Second Boer War and First World War, one of the principal commanders of the Irish War of Independence
- Sir Henry Wells, a senior officer in the Australian Army, Chief of the General Staff from 1954 to 1958, one of the principal commanders of the Malayan Emergency
- Henry Tingle Wilde (1872–1912), chief officer of the RMS Titanic
- Henry Williams, leader of the Church Missionary Society (CMS) mission in New Zealand in the first half of the 19th century and during the Flagstaff War
- Sir Henry Wilson, 1st Baronet (1864–1922), senior British Army staff officer during the First World War and Irish unionist politician
- Henry Maitland Wilson, senior British Army officer of the 20th century, one of the principal commanders of Mediterranean and Middle East theatre of World War II, Balkans campaign, Battle of Greece and Operation Compass
- Henry Wirz, Swiss-American officer of the Confederate States Army and a convicted war criminal, the commandant of the stockade of Camp Sumter concentration camp

=== Politicians ===
- Henry Abeywickrema (1905–1976), Sri Lankan Cabinet minister
- Henry Addington (1757–1844), British statesman and Prime Minister of United Kingdom, one of the principal commanders of the French Revolutionary Wars
- Henry Woodward Amarasuriya (1904–1981), Sri Lankan Cabinet minister, founding member of the United National Party, educationist, philanthropist, and plantation owner
- Henry Bathurst, 3rd Earl Bathurst, British politician and Secretary of State for Foreign and Commonwealth Affairs
- Henry Bertram Price, Governor of Guam
- Henry Givens Burgess, Irish railway executive and politician
- Henry Francis Bryan (1865–1944), 17th Governor of American Samoa
- Henry Clay (1777–1852), American statesman, politician, war hawk, presidential candidate, and founder of the Whig Party
- Henry De Mel (1877–1936), Sri Lankan Sinhala industrialist, lawyer, philanthropist, and member of the Legislative Council of Ceylon
- Henry S. Evans (1813–1872), American politician
- Henry D. Gilpin (1801–1860), 14th Attorney General of the United States
- Henry Goonesekera, Sri Lankan Sinhala politician, member of the 2nd State Council of Ceylon
- Henry Goulburn (1784–1856), British Conservative statesman and a member of the Peelite faction after 1846
- Henry Schell Hagert (1826–1885), District attorney for Philadelphia
- James Henry Hammond (1807–1864), 60th governor of South Carolina
- Henry Harcourt (1873–1933), British politician
- Henry E. Huntting (1828–1903), American politician
- Henry Kotelawala, Sri Lankan Sinhala politician
- Henry Kao (1913–2005), Mayor of Taipei from 1954 to 1957 and again between 1964 and 1972.
- Henry Lamm (1846–1926), justice of the Supreme Court of Missouri
- Henry A. Larson (1877–1948), Minnesota state senator
- Henry McFadden (1798–1875), American farmer and politician
- Henry McMaster (born 1947), American politician
- Henry Minor (1783–1839), justice of the Supreme Court of Alabama
- Henry Morgan (1635–1688), Welsh pirate, privateer, slaveholder, and Lieutenant Governor of Jamaica, one of the principal commanders of the Anglo-Spanish War (1654–1660)
- Henry Paulson, American banker who served as the 74th United States Secretary of the Treasury from 2006 to 2009
- Henry Peiris (1910–1959), Sri Lankan Sinhala Marxist politician
- Henry Pelham-Clinton, 5th Duke of Newcastle, British politician and Secretary of State for War and the Colonies
- Henry Petty-Fitzmaurice, 5th Marquess of Lansdowne, British statesman who served successively as the fifth Governor General of Canada, Viceroy of India, Secretary of State for War, and Secretary of State for Foreign Affairs
- Henry Phipps, 1st Earl of Mulgrave, British politician and Secretary of State for Foreign and Commonwealth Affairs
- Henry Pollock, English barrister who became a prominent politician in Hong Kong, the attorney general of Hong Kong
- Henry Riggs Rathbone (1870–1928), congressman from Illinois
- Henry Thambiah (1906–1997), Sri Lankan Tamil academic, judge, and diplomat
- Henry Lorensz Wendt (1858–1911), Sri Lankan Burgher lawyer, judge, and legislator

=== Film ===
- Henry, Indian producer
- Henry "Hank" Azaria (born 1964), American actor in film, television, and theater
- Henry Cavill (born 1983), British actor
- Henry Czerny (born 1959), Canadian film, stage, and television actor
- Henry Daniell (1894–1963), English actor
- Henry Fonda (1905–1982), American actor
- Henry Golding (born 1987), British Malaysian actor
- Henry Hathaway (1898–1985), American film director
- Henry Hunter Hall (born 1997), American actor
- Henry Jayasena (1931–2009), Sri Lankan actor in cinema, television, and theater
- Henry King (1886–1982), American actor and film director
- Henry Koster (1905–1988), German-American film director
- Henry Roxby Beverley (1790–1863), English actor
- Henry Selick (born 1952), American stop-motion film director
- Henry Thomas (born 1971), American actor
- Henry B. Walthall (1878–1936), American actor
- Henry Winkler (born 1945), American actor and producer

=== Music ===
- Henry Brant (1913–2008) Canadian born American composer
- Henry Cowell (1897–1965), American composer, writer, pianist, publisher, teacher and the husband of Sidney Robertson Cowell
- Henry Jackman (born 1974), English composer
- Henry John Deutschendorf Jr (1943–1997) known professionally as John Denver, American singer
- Henry Krtschil (1932–2020), German composer
- Henry Lau (born 1989), Canadian singer, musician, and actor, who performs under the mononym Henry
- Henry Mancini (1924–1994), American composer
- Henry Olmino (born 1974), American musician
- Henry Purcell (1659–1695), English composer
- Henry Rollins (born 1961), American singer
- Henry Samuel (born 1963), British singer-songwriter known professionally as Seal

=== Scientists ===
- W. Henry Bragg, British physicist, chemist, mathematician, and active sportsman
- Henry Renno Heyl (1842–1919), American inventor and chemist
- Henry Parker Sartwell (1792–1867), American botanist
- Henry I. Smith (born 1937), American physicist and inventor
- Henry Fox Talbot (1800–1877), English scientist, inventor, and photography pioneer

=== Businessmen ===
- Henry Bizot (1901–1990), French banker and first chairman of the Banque Nationale de Paris
- Henry Canoy (1923–2008), Filipino businessman and founder of Radio Mindanao Network
- Henry Cheng (born 1946), Hong Kong billionaire property developer
- Henry Flagler (1830–1913), American tycoon, real estate promoter, and railroad developer, known as the father of Miami, Florida
- Henry Fok (1923–2006), Hong Kong businessman
- Henry Ford (1863–1947), American inventor, industrialist, father of the modern assembly line, and founder of Ford Motor Company
- Henry Givens Burgess, Irish railway executive and politician
- Henry J. Heinz, German entrepreneur and founder of Heinz Ketchup company
- H. F. S. Morgan (1881–1959), English sports car manufacturer and founder and chairman of the Morgan Motor Company
- Henry Sy (1924–2019), Chinese-Filipino billionaire, business magnate, investor, philanthropist and founder of SM Prime Holdings Inc.

=== Explorers ===
- Henry Hudson (born c. 1560s/70s), English sea explorer
- Prince Henry the Navigator (1394–1460), responsible for the early development of European exploration and maritime trade with other continents

=== Literary figures ===
- Ralph Henry Barbour, American novelist
- Henry G. Brinton (born 1960), American author and pastor, a contributor to the Washington Post and USA Today
- Henry Graham Dakyns (1838–1911), British translator
- Henry James (1843–1916), American author
- Henry Charles Lea (1825–1909), American historian
- Henry Wadsworth Longfellow (1807–1882), American poet
- Henry Miller (1891–1980), American writer
- Henry Peterson (1818–1891), American editor, novelist, poet and playwright
- Henry David Thoreau (1817–1862), American author

=== Criminals ===
- Henry Grammer (1883–1923), American cowboy, bootlegger, and murderer
- Henry Lee Lucas (1936–2001), American serial killer

=== Artists ===
- Henry Ward Ranger (1858–1916), American artist
- John Henry Lorimer, Scottish painter
- Henry Moore (1898–1986), English sculptor and artist
- Henry Orth (1866–1946), American architect
- Henry Parayre (1879–1970), French sculptor
- Henry Payne, British stained glass artist, watercolourist and painter of frescoes
- Henry Richardson (born 1961), American sculptor
- Henry Strater (1896–1987) American painter and illustrator
- Henry Ossawa Tanner, American artist and the first African-American painter to gain international acclaim

=== Sportsmen ===
- Henry "Hank" Aaron (1934–2021), American baseball player
- Henry Adjei-Darko (born 1983), Ghanaian tennis player
- Henry Austin (baseball) (1844–1904), American baseball player
- Henry Adrian Austin (born 1972), Barbadian cricketer
- Henry Fitzherbert Austin (1874–1957), Barbadian cricketer
- Henry Bibby (born 1949), American basketball player
- Henry Brzustewicz (born 2007), American ice hockey player
- Henry Cárdenas (born 1965), Colombian road cyclist
- Henry Cejudo (born 1987), American mixed martial artist and UFC Flyweight Champion
- Henry Collins (boxer) (born 1977), Australian boxer
- Henry Cooper (1934–2011), British boxer, British, European and Commonwealth heavyweight champion in 1970
- Henry Duhamel (1853–1917), French mountaineer, author, and skiing pioneer
- Henry Galinato (born 1997), Filipino-American basketball player
- Henry Louis "Lou" Gehrig (1903–1941), American baseball player nicknamed "The Iron Horse"
- Hank Greenberg (1911–1986), American hall of fame baseball player
- Henry Hynoski (born 1988), American football player
- Henry Hynoski Sr. (born 1953), American football player
- Henry Marsh (runner) (born 1954), American long-distance runner
- Henry Maske (born 1964), German boxer
- Henry Menzies (rugby union) (1867–1938), Scottish rugby union player
- Henry Mondeaux (born 1995), American football player
- Henry Obst (1906–1975), American football player
- Henry Orth (American football) (1897–1980), American football player
- Henry Prusoff (1912–1943), American professional tennis player
- Henry Purver (1891–1916), English professional footballer
- Henry Ruggs (born 1999), American football player
- Henry Schichtle (born 1941), American football player
- Henry Speight (born 1988), Australian rugby union player
- Henry Surtees (1991–2009), British racing driver
- Henry Sugut (born 1985), Kenyan long-distance runner
- Henry To'oTo'o (born 2001), American football player

=== Others ===
- Henry Allingham (1896–2009), briefly the world's oldest man
- Henry L. Bachman (born 1930), American electrical engineer
- H. Parrott Bacot (born Henry Parrott Bacot; 1941–2020), art historian and museum director
- Henry Adams Bellows, newspaper editor and radio executive
- Henry Bender (fl. 1850–1869), German Jewish bookseller
- Henry Engelbert (1826–1901), German-American architect
- Henry Louis Gates Jr., American literary critic, professor, historian, and filmmaker
- Henry George, American political economist and journalist
- Henry Goddard Leach (1880–1970), American Scandinavian studies scholar
- Henry Alfred Ian Goonetilleke, Sri Lankan Sinhala library director at the University of Peradeniya and scholar
- Henry Wilson Hodge (1865–1919), American civil engineer
- Henry Kelly (1946–2025), Irish television presenter and radio DJ
- Henry Liddell (1811–1898), British university dean and author
- Henry Mayhew, English social researcher, journalist, playwright, and reform advocate
- Henry Plumer McIlhenny (1910-1986), American art collector, philanthropist, and curator of the Philadelphia Museum of Art
- Henry More, English philosopher of the Cambridge Platonist school
- Henry Morgentaler (1923–2013), Canadian physician and abortion activist
- Henry Newman, British political adviser
- Henry Omaga-Diaz (born 1961), Filipino journalist, news anchor, and radio newscaster
- Henry Patenson (1487–1543), English household fool in the service of Sir Thomas More
- Henry F. Pulitzer (1899–1979), Austrian-born publisher and art collector
- Henry Winthrop Sargent (1810–1882), American horticulturist
- Henry Thomas Silcock (1882–1969), English Quaker missionary
- Henry Slonimsky (1884–1970), Belarusian-American professor
- Henry N. Tisdale (born 1944), American academic administrator, educator, and mathematician
- Henry Augustus Pearson Torrey (1837–1902), American professor of philosophy
- Henry Wade (1914–2001), American lawyer who participated in Roe v. Wade

== Fictional characters ==
- Henery Hawk, Warner Bros. Looney Tunes character
- Henry, a character from the 2008 video game No More Heroes
- Henry the Octopus, a character from The Wiggles
- Henry (comics), a comic character that began in 1932
- Henry the Green Engine, a steam locomotive from The Railway Series and Thomas & Friends
- Henry I, another character from the television series Once Upon a Time
- Uncle Henry, character from the Oz books by L. Frank Baum
- Horrid Henry, fictional character from the eponymous children's book series and comedy television show
- Lt. Col. Henry Braymore Blake, a character in the M*A*S*H novels, film and TV series
- Henry Deacon, from the television series Eureka
- Henry Emily, a character in the Five Nights at Freddy's series, co-founder of the enterprises
- Henry Huggins, a character created by Beverly Cleary
- Dr. Henry Jekyll, title character in the Robert Louis Stevenson novel Strange Case of Dr. Jekyll and Mr. Hyde
- Henry/Hank Jennings, a character from the television series Twin Peaks
- Dr. Henry Jones, Jr. (Indiana Jones), the title character and the protagonist of the Indiana Jones franchise
- Henry McCoy (a.k.a. Beast), a comic book superhero in Marvel Comics
- Henry Mills, a primary character from the television series Once Upon a Time
- Henry "Hank" Moody, protagonist of the Showtime television series Californication
- Hank Pym (a.k.a. Ant Man, Giant Man, Goliath, and Yellowjacket), a comic book superhero in Marvel Comics
- Henry Rearden, steelmaker from the Ayn Rand book Atlas Shrugged
- Henry Townshend, main protagonist in the video game Silent Hill 4
- Mr. Henry J. Waternoose III, the secondary main antagonist in the film Monsters, Inc.
- Henry "Hank" Voight, a main character from the television series Chicago P.D.
- Dr. Henry Wu, a character in the Jurassic Park franchise

== See also ==
- Henry (disambiguation)
- Henry (surname)
