= Henning =

Henning is a surname, as well as a given name.

== Etymology of the surname ==
The surname originated in East Prussia. It is derived from "Henneke", which is a diminutive of Johannes. The Low German suffix -ing means "son of". The name is indigenous to the North German areas Mecklenburg, Hannover, Hamburg, Holstein and Pommern; especially the towns Stralsund and Greifswald, in Mecklenburg, near the Baltic Sea is well known as places where the name originated. Both towns formed part of Denmark up until the Thirty Years' War (1618–1648).

Between the years 1300 and 1500 the name was used as a popular nickname for "the Son of John (Johannes)". The Baltic (or North German) “ing” was added to indicate that it was a name deduced from the name of a father or ancestor.

The name originated amongst noblemen and knights, such as:

- Henning = Johannes Older, who lived during 1290 in the vicinity of Stralsund.
- Henning = Johannes Brunswick, who lived during 1305 at Kolberg.
- Henning = Johannes Dotenberg (Knight) who lived during 1326 in the vicinity of Greiffswald. It is thought that he could be a descendant of Johannes Older.
- Earl Henning of Irkesleve, who lived during 1330 in Haldslohe.

== Distribution ==
During the 13th and 14th centuries the descendants of these first Hennings spread over the areas of what is now Germany, Denmark and Norway.

During the 17th and 18th centuries, several Hennings moved elsewhere, including the New World. Today, one of the biggest Henning clans is found in South Africa. However, Henning families exist in almost every country in the Western world.

A few Henning descendants remained in the vicinity of Stralsund and Greifswald. It is known that Jacob Henning (the Old) was born during 1635 at Demmin (near Greifswald). Jacob Henning and his descendants became known as the Henning Family of Karnin. Karnin is approximately 25 km from Stralsund. Jacob Henning and his descendants were wealthy and important property owners, who lived in a castle. Their castle was confiscated in 1945, during the Second World War, by the communist government who took over East Germany. Consequently the family spread across West Germany.

== People named Henning ==
=== Surname ===
- A. J. Henning (born 2002), American football player
- Andrew Henning (1863–1947), lawyer and politician in Western Australia
- Anne Henning (born 1955), American former speed skater
- Cameron Henning (born 1960), Canadian swimmer
- Dieter Henning (1936–2007), German engineer
- Dan Henning (born 1942), American former National Football League quarterback and head coach
- Doug Henning (1947–2000), Canadian magician and illusionist
- Eva Henning (1920–2016), Swedish actress
- Gerda Henning (1891–1951), Danish textile designer
- Hal Henning (1919–1988), American swimming administrator
- Harold Henning (1934–2004), South African golfer
- Helga Henning (1937–2018), German sprinter
- Holger Henning (1905–1981), Swedish Navy vice admiral
- John Henning (1771–1851), Scottish sculptor
- John Henning (journalist) (1937–2010), American reporter and political analyst
- John F. Henning (1915–2009), American labor leader and ambassador
- Klaus Henning (born 1945), German information scientist
- Linda Kaye Henning (born 1944), American TV actress
- Lorne Henning (born 1952), Canadian ice-hockey executive and former player
- Megan Henning (fl. 2000–2013), American actress
- Paul Henning (1911–2005), American TV producer and writer best known for The Beverly Hillbillies
- Rachel Henning (1826–1914), Australian letter writer
- Rasmus Henning (born 1975), Danish triathlete
- Richard Henning (born 1964), American Catholic Archbishop of Boston
- Sonja Henning (born 1969), American basketball player
- Thomas Henning (born 1956), German astrophysicist
- Thomas Henning (artist), Australian writer, stage director, producer and artist
- Uno Henning (1895–1970), Swedish actor
- Walter Bruno Henning (1908–1967), German scholar of Middle Iranian languages
- Juliano Barcélos Henning (born 1982), Brazilian musician and brand specialist

=== Given name ===
- Henning Baum (born 1972), German film and TV actor
- Henning Berg (born 1969), Norwegian football manager and former player
- Henning Braunisch, American electrical engineer
- Henning Dedekind (1562–1626), German composer
- Henning Engelsen (1918–2005), Norwegian wood carver
- Henning Fritz (born 1974), German former handball goalkeeper
- Henning Harnisch (born 1968), German retired basketball player
- Henning Hyllested (born 1954), Danish politician
- Henning Illies (1924–1982), German geologist
- Henning Jensen (disambiguation)
- Henning von Krusenstierna (1862–1933), Swedish admiral
- Henning Larsen (disambiguation)
- Henning Leo (1885–1953), Swedish politician
- Henning Mankell (1948–2015), Swedish crime writer, children's author and dramatist
- Henning Mankell (composer) (1868–1930), Swedish composer, grandfather of the above
- Henning May, German musician
- Henning Rübsam, German-born American choreographer and director
- Henning Scheich (1942–2025), German brain researcher and psychiatrist
- Henning Solberg (born 1973), Norwegian rally driver
- Henning von Tresckow (1901–1944), German major general involved in the 20 July 1944 attempt to assassinate Hitler
- Henning Voscherau (1941–2016), German politician, mayor of Hamburg
- Henning Wehn (born 1974), German comedian based in London
- Henning Wind (1937–2025), Danish competitive sailor

== Books ==
- Die Henning Familiekroniek, ISBN 0-620-20300-5

== See also ==
- Hening, a surname
- Hennings, a surname
