= Americo =

Americo (or Américo) is a Portuguese- and Spanish-language given name, occasionally used as a surname and in other cultures. It is a variant of the name Henry.

English diminutives or hypocorisms include Rico & Eric.

Notable people with the name include:

== Arts and entertainment ==
- Américo (born 1977), a Chilean singer
- Americo Boschetti (born 1951), a Puerto Rican musician
- Américo Castilla, an Argentine artist
- Americo Garcia, member of the electronic music duo Boombox Cartel
- Américo Hoss (1914–1990), a Hungarian-Argentine cinematographer
- Americo Makk (1927–2015), a Hungarian-American artist
- Americo Paredes (1915–1999), a Mexican-American author
- Americo Sbigoli (died 1822), an Italian singer
- Pedro Américo (1843–1905), a Brazilian painter, politician, and scientist

=== Pseudonyms ===
- Américo Elísio, literary pseudonym of Brazilian statesman and scientist José Bonifácio de Andrada

== Politics and government ==
- Américo Boavida (1923–1968), an Angolan physician and activist
- Américo Brasiliense de Almeida Melo (1833–1896), a Brazilian politician
- Américo António Cuononoca, an Angolan anthropologist and politician
- Américo Ghioldi (1899–1985), an Argentine educator and activist
- Americo Santiago (born 1951), an American politician
- Américo Tomás (1894–1987), a Portuguese naval officer and politician

== Sports ==
- Américo Astete (born 1967), an Argentine alpine skier
- Américo Bonetti (1928–1999), an Argentine boxer
- Américo Fernandes (1899–?), a Brazilian rower
- Américo Gallego (born 1955), an Argentine footballer
- Américo González (footballer), a Salvadoran footballer
- Américo González (pentathlete) (born 1925), an Uruguayan modern pentathlete
- Américo Lopes (1933–2023), a Portuguese footballer
- Américo Montanarini (1917–1994), a Brazilian basketball player
- Américo Martins Pereira Júnior (born 1993), a Brazilian footballer
- Américo Rocca (born 1952), a Mexican wrestler
- Américo Ruffino (1905–1988), an Argentine footballer
- Américo Tesoriere (1899–1977), an Argentine footballer
- Ben Bedini (1921–2008), an American baseball player, born Americo Bendini
- Edu (footballer, born 1949), a Brazilian footballer, born Jonas Eduardo Américo
- Mertz Mortorelli (1921–1985), an American football coach, born Americo Mortorelli
- Rick Sapienza (born 1936), an American football player, born Americo Sapienza
- Rico Petrocelli (born 1943), an American baseball player, born Americo Petrocelli
- Thomas Americo (1958–1999), an East Timorese boxer

== Other fields ==
- Américo Amorim (1934–2017), a Portuguese industrialist
- Américo Castro (1885–1972), a Spanish cultural historian
- Américo Henriques (1923–2006), a Portuguese Catholic bishop

== See also ==
- Amalric, a Gothic-language name, including links to related names
- Amerigo (disambiguation)
- American (disambiguation)
