= Henrika =

Henrika (Swedish; variants include Henrika, Henriikka, in Finnish, Henryka, in Polish; Henrica, (in Dutch) is a feminine given name, a female form of Henry. People with the name include:

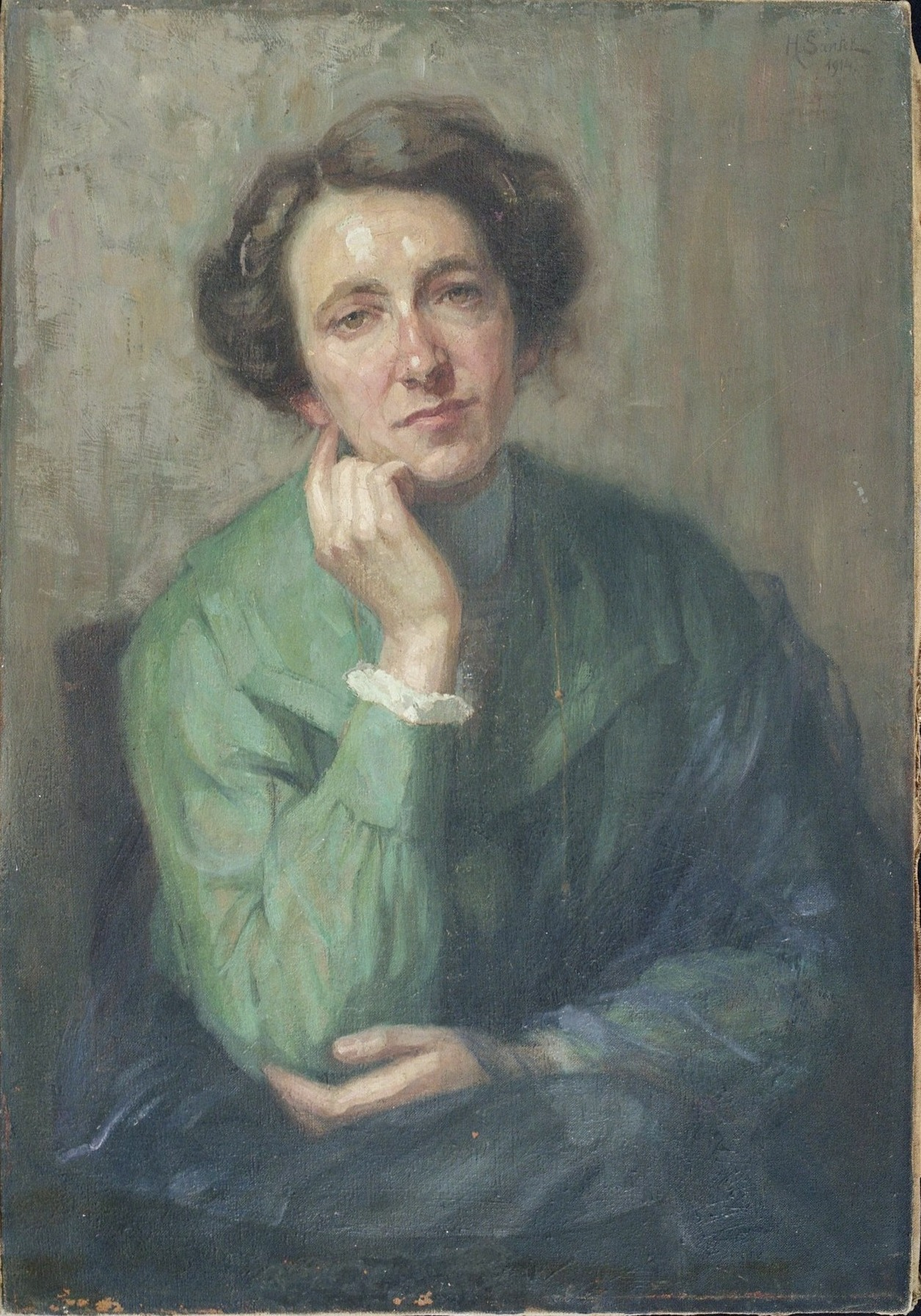
Self-portrait (1914) by Slovenian painter Henrika Šantel

Henrika

- Henrika Juliana von Liewen (1709–1779), Swedish noble, socialite and lady-in-waiting
- Henrika Ringbom (born 1962), Swedish-Finnish writer, translator and journalist
- Henrika Šantel (1874–1940), Slovenian painter
- Henrika Tandefelt (born 1972), Swedish-Finnish historian

Henriika

- Henriikka Hietaniemi (born 1987), Finnish figure skater

Henryka

- Henryka Beyer (1782–1855), German painter active in Poland
- Henryka Bochniarz (born 1947), Polish economist and government minister
- Henryka Konarkowska (born 1938), Polish–Serbian chess master
- Henryka Krzywonos (born 1953), Polish dissident
- Henryka Łazowertówna (1909–1942), Polish lyric poet

Henrica

- Henrica van Erp (c.1480–1548), Dutch abbess and chronicler
- Henrica "Erica" van den Heuvel (born 1966), Dutch badminton player
- Leontine Martha Henrica Petronella "Leontien" van Moorsel (born 1970), Dutch cyclist
- Henrica Judith van Nijnatten-Doffegnies (1898–1990), Dutch writer

== See also ==
- 826 Henrika, a minor planet
- Henrica, a genus of fungi
- Hendrika, a Dutch version of the name
- Henrikas, a Lithuanian masculine given name
