= Hinrich =

Hinrich is both a masculine given name and a surname, a variant of Heinrich, the German form of Henry. People with the name include:

Given name:

- Hinrich Bitter-Suermann (born 1940), German-Canadian pathologist and professor of surgery
- Hinrich Braren (1751–1826), Danish sailor and writer
- Hinrich Brunsberg (1350–1420s/1430s), German architect
- Hinrich John (born 1936), German Olympic hurdler
- Hinrich Wilhelm Kopf (1893–1961), German politician
- Hinrich Ladiges (1731–1805), German-Danish sugar manufacturer
- Hinrich Lehmann-Grube (1932–2017), German politician
- Hinrich Lichtenstein (1780–1857), German physician, explorer, botanist and zoologist
- Hinrich Lohse (1896–1964), German Nazi politician and convicted war criminal
- Hinrich Möller (1906–1974), German SS-Brigadeführer and Generalmajor of Police
- Hinrich Nitsche (1845–1902), German zoologist
- Hinrich Johannes Rink (1819–1893), Danish geologist, one of the pioneers of glaciology and the first accurate describer of the inland ice of Greenland
- Hinrich Romeike (born 1963), German equestrian
- Hinrich Schuldt (1901–1944), German Waffen-SS officer
- Hinrich Siuts (born 1932), German folklorist
- Hinrich Warrelmann (1904–1980), German general

Surname:

- Hans Hinrich (1903–1974), German film director and actor
- Kirk Hinrich (born 1981), American basketball player

== See also ==
- Hinrichs
- Hans-Hinrich Koch, German producer
- German trawler V 210 Hinrich Hey
- German trawler V 405 J. Hinrich Wilhelms
- German weather ship WBS 4 Hinrich Freese
