= Henningsson =

Henningsson is a surname. Notable people with the surname include:

- Alexander Henningsson (born 1990), Swedish footballer
- Gunnar Henningsson (1895–1960), Swedish poet, idealist and teacher
- Hilmar Smári Henningsson (born 2000), Icelandic basketball player
- Oskar Henningsson (born 1985), Swedish professional golfer
- Philip Henningsson (born 1995), Swedish handball player

== See also ==
- Hennings
- Henningsen
