= Henric =

Henric is a given name. Notable people with the name include:

- Carl-Henric Svanberg (born 1952), Swedish businessman, chairman of Volvo and CEO of telecommunications company Ericsson
- Fredrik Henric af Chapman (1721–1808), Swedish shipbuilder, scientist and officer in the Swedish navy
- Hans Henric von Essen (1755–1824), Swedish officer and statesman
- Henric Benzelius (1689–1758), Bishop of Lund, Archbishop of Uppsala in the Church of Sweden
- Henric Cihoski (born 1871), Romanian Lieutenant-General during World War II
- Henric de la Cour (born 1974), Swedish songwriter, musician and singer
- Henric Hedlund (born 1945), retired Swedish professional ice hockey player
- Henric Hirsch (1923–1999), Romanian theatre and television director
- Henric Holmberg (1946–2026), Swedish actor, director and scriptwriter
- Henric Horn af Åminne (1880–1947), Swedish horse rider
- Henric Petri or Henricus Petrus or Sebastian Henric Petri, names used for publications from a 16th-century printer shop of Basel
- Henric Schartau (1757–1825), Swedish Lutheran pietistic clergyman
- Henric Trenk (1818–1892), Swiss-born Romanian painter and graphic artist
- Henric van Veldeke (born before or c. 1150 – died after 1184), writer
- Johan Henric Kellgren (1751–1795), Swedish poet and critic
- Laurent Henric (1905–1992), French footballer and coach

== See also ==
- Heinrich (disambiguation)
- Heinrichs
- Henrich
- Henrik
- Henrique (disambiguation)
- Henriques (disambiguation)
