= Henrikas =

- Gender: Male
- Language: Lithuanian
- Name day: 13 July

Origin
- Region of origin: Lithuania

Other names
- Related names: Herkus, Enrikas, Henris, Henrikus

Henrikas is a Lithuanian masculine given name. It is the Lithuanian cognate of the German language name Heinrich and the English language name Henry. People with the name Henrikas include:

- Henrikas Ciparis (b. 1941), Lithuanian painter
- Henrikas Juškevičius (b. 1935), Lithuanian electrical engineer and journalist
- Henrikas Natalevičius (b. 1953), Lithuanian painter
- Henrikas Radauskas (1910–1970), Lithuanian poet and writer
- Henrikas Žustautas (born 1994), Lithuanian sprint canoer

== Similar and related names ==
Enrico, Enrik, Enrikas, Enrike, Enrikė, Enriki, Enrikis, Enrique, Enrykas, Heinrich, Hendrik, Hendrikas, Henri, Henrichas, Henrik, Henryk, Indrek, Enris, Hari, Haris, Harry, Henris, Henry, Herkus, Henrikus.
