= Hening =

Hening is a surname. Notable people with the surname include:

- Christian Maicon Hening (born 1978), also known as Chris (footballer), Brazilian footballer
- Thomas S. Hening (1871–1934), American doctor and politician
- William Waller Hening (1768–1828), American attorney, legal scholar, publisher and politician

== See also ==
- Henning, a surname and given name
- Hennings, a surname
- Henin, a surname
