= Indrek =

Male given name

- Gender: Male
- Language: Estonian
- Name day: 10 April

Origin
- Region of origin: Estonia

Other names
- Related names: Hindrek, Ints

Indrek is an Estonian masculine given name. It is the Estonian form of Henry and may refer to:

- Indrek Allmann (born 1972), architect
- Indrek Hargla (born 1970), novelist and screenwriter
- Indrek Hirv (born 1956), Estonian poet, translator and artist
- Indrek Kajupank (born 1988), basketball player
- Indrek Kannik (born 1965), journalist, civil servant and politician
- Indrek Kaseorg (born 1967), decathlete
- Indrek Meelak (born 1960), prosecutor and politician
- Indrek Otsus (born 1955), bodybuilder and cyclist
- Indrek Pertelson (born 1971), judoka
- Indrek Raadik (born 1975), musician
- Indrek Raudne (born 1975), entrepreneur and politician
- Indrek Reinbok (born 1976), basketball player and coach
- Indrek Rumma (born 1969), basketball player
- Indrek Saar (born 1973), politician and actor
- Indrek Sammul (born 1972), actor
- Indrek Sei (born 1972), swimmer
- Indrek Sirel (born 1970), military commander
- Indrek Siska (born 1984), beach soccer player
- Indrek Taalmaa (born 1967), actor
- Indrek Tarand (born 1964), politician
- Indrek Tart (born 1946), sociologist, literary scientist and poet
- Indrek Teder (born 1957), lawyer, jurist and politician
- Indrek Toome (1943–2023), politician and businessman
- Indrek Tobreluts (born 1976), biathlete
- Indrek Treufeldt (born 1969), journalist and academic
- Indrek Turi (born 1981), decathlete
- Indrek Tustit (born 1978), track and field athlete, coach and physiotherapist
- Indrek Varblane (born 1968), basketball player
- Indrek Visnapuu (born 1976), basketball player and coach
- Indrek Zelinski (born 1974), football player

== Fictional characters ==
- Indrek Paas, protagonist in A. H. Tammsaare's 1926–1933 pentalogy Truth and Justice

== See also ==
- Truth and Justice (Estonian: Tõde ja õigus), a 1926–1933 pentalogy by Estonian author Anton Hansen Tammsaare which features a character named Indrek.
