= Henningsen =

Henningsen is a patronymic surname, created from the given name Henning. Notable people with the surname include:

- Agnes Henningsen (1868–1962), Danish writer and activist
- Alfred Meyer Henningsen (1918–2012), Norwegian politician
- Ann Margarit Henningsen (born 1949), Mexican sprint canoer
- Casper Henningsen (born 1985), Danish footballer and business executive
- Charles Frederick Henningsen (1815–1877), Belgian-American writer and military figure
- Erik Henningsen (1855–1930), Danish painter and illustrator
- Erika Henningsen (born 1992), American actress
- Frants Henningsen (1850–1908), Danish painter and illustrator
- Frits Henningsen (1889–1965), Danish furniture designer and cabinetmaker
- Inge Henningsen (born 1941), Danish statistician
- Jan Henningsen (born 1954), Danish motorcycle racer
- Juliane Henningsen (born 1984), Danish politician
- Matt Henningsen (born 1999), American football player
- Otto Henningsen (1883–1961), American politician
- Poul Henningsen (1894–1967), Danish architect and writer
- Thorkild Henningsen (1884–1931), Danish architect

== See also ==
- Henningsen v. Bloomfield Motors, Inc.
