= Henrici =

The surname Henrici is the possessive form of the Latin name "Henricus", i.e. "Henry".

Henrici may refer to:

- Christian Friedrich Henrici, known as Picander (1700–1764), German poet and librettist
- Cornelius Henrici Hoen, known as Honius (died 1524), Dutch jurist and humanist
- Ernst Henrici (1854–1915), German grammar school teacher, writer, colonial adventurer and antisemitic politician
- Marguerite Gertrud Anna Henrici (1892–1971), Swiss-born South African plant physiologist
- Olaus Henrici (1840–1918), Mathematics professor in London
- Peter Henrici (mathematician) (1923–1987), Swiss mathematician
- Peter Henrici (Jesuit) (1928–2023), Swiss priest, philosopher and professor
- Sigfrid Henrici (1889–1964), German general

== See also ==
- Heinrici
