= Anrijs =

Male given name

- Gender: Male

Origin
- Region of origin: Latvia

Other names
- Related names: Henry, Henrijs, Indriķis

Anrijs is a Latvian masculine given name. It is an alternative spelling of Henrijs and alternative of Indriķis, the Latvian forms of Henry. It may refer to:

- Anrijs Matīss (born 1973), Latvian politician and former Minister for Transport of Latvia
- Anrijs Sirmais, Latvian actor
