= Henning (disambiguation) =

Henning is a given name and surname. It may also refer to:

== Places ==
=== United States ===
- Henning, Illinois, a village
- Henning, Minnesota, a city
- Henning, Tennessee, a town
- Henning, West Virginia, an unincorporated community

=== Norway ===
- Henning, Steinkjer, a village

== Other uses ==
- Henning Church, a church in the Norwegian village
