= Hinrichs =

Hinrichs is a German surname. Notable people with the surname include:

- Carl Hinrichs (1907–1967), German actor
- Denise Hinrichs (born 1987), German shot putter
- Dutch Hinrichs (1889–1972), American baseball player
- Fabian Hinrichs (born 1976), German actor
- Gustav Hinrichs (1850–1942), German-born American composer and conductor
- Gustavus Detlef Hinrichs (1836–1923), German chemist
- Hermann Friedrich Wilhelm Hinrichs (1794–1861), German philosopher
- John Hinrichs (1936–2012), American mechanical engineer
- John Honeycutt Hinrichs (1904–1990), United States Army general and 20th Chief of Ordnance, U.S. Army
- Joseph R. Hinrichs (born 1966), American business executive
- Lars Hinrichs (born 1976), German businessman
- Paul Hinrichs (1925–2023), American baseball player
- Seth Hinrichs (born 1993), American/German basketball player
- Ursula Hinrichs (born 1935), German actress

== See also ==
- Johann von Hinrichs (1752–1834), Prussian military officer
- Hinrich
- Henrique (disambiguation)
