= Henricus (given name) =

Henricus is a Latinized form of the Germanic masculine given name Haimriks ("Henry").

People with the name include:

- Henry of Avranches (died 1260) (in Latin: Henricus Abrincensis or de Abrincis), French poet
- Henry (bishop of Finland) (allegedly died c. 1156) (in Latin: Henricus), English clergyman who may not have existed and, according to legend, died a martyr
- Henry of Friemar (c. 1285–1354), also known as Henricus de Vrimaria or Henricus de Frimaria, German Augustinian theologian
- Henry of Marcy (c. 1136–1189), also known as Henricus Albanensis, Henricus Cisterciensis, etc., Cistercian abbot and Cardinal Bishop of Albano
- Henry of Latvia (before 1188–after 1259) (in Latin: Henricus de Lettis), Roman Catholic priest, missionary and historian from Magdeburg
- Henry of Segusio (c. 1200–1271), also known as Henricus de Segusio, Italian canonist
- Henry of Settimello (in Latin: Henricus Septimellensis), late 12th-century Italian poet
- Henry Aristippus (1105 to 1110–1162), religious scholar and Archdeacon of Catania
- Henry Bate of Mechelen (1246–after 1310), also known as Henricus Batenus, Flemish philosopher, theologian, astronomer, astrologer, poet, and musician
- Heinrich Blyssen (1526–1586) (in Latin: Henricus Blissemius), German Jesuit controversialist against the Hussites of Bohemia
- Harry van Bommel (born 1962), Dutch politician, anti-globalization activist and former educator
- Johann Heinrich Bösenselle (died 1767) (in Latin: Henricus Antonius Bösenselle), lawyer, professor of law and Rector of the University of Olomouc
- Henricus Canisius (1562–1610), Dutch canonist and historian
- Enrico Dandolo (1107?–1205), Latinized as Henricus Dandulus, 42nd Doge of Venice
- Harry Droog (born 1944), Dutch retired rower
- Henk van Gerven (born 1955), Dutch politician and physician
- Henricus Grammateus (1495–1525 or 1526), German mathematician
- Henricus von Gunterrodt, author of a treatise on fencing published in 1579
- Hendrik Herp (died 1477) (in Latin: Henricus Herpius or Harpius), Flemish Franciscan
- Hendrik Hondius I (1573–1650), Flemish engraver, cartographer and publisher
- Henricus Hondius II (1597–1651), Dutch engraver, cartographer and publisher, unrelated to the above
- Henricus Hornkens (died 1612), Roman Catholic priest and lexicographer
- Servais Knaven (born 1971), Dutch retired cyclist
- Heinrich Kramer (c. 1430–1505), Latinized as Henricus Institor, German churchman and inquisitor
- Heinrich Isaac (c. 1450–1517), Netherlandish Renaissance composer
- Henri Justel (1620–1693), also known as Henricus Justellus, French scholar and royal administrator
- Henk Kamp (born 1952), Dutch politician and Minister of Economic Affairs
- Hans Kuypers (1925–1989), Dutch neuroscientist
- Harry Lubse (born 1951), Dutch retired footballer
- Henricus Martellus Germanus, Latinized name of Heinrich Hammer, German geographer and cartographer who worked in Florence from 1480 to 1496
- Henricus Madathanus, pseudonym of Adrian von Mynsicht (1603–1638), German alchemist
- Han van Meegeren (1889–1947), Dutch painter and notorious art forger
- Hans van Mierlo (1931–2010), Dutch politician, party leader, Deputy Prime Minister, Minister of Defense and Minister of Foreign Affairs of the Netherlands
- Herkus Monte (died 1273) (in Latin: Henricus Montemin), the most famous leader of the Great Prussian Uprising against the Teutonic Knights and Northern Crusaders
- Henricus Münstermann (c. 1470–1537), German Roman Catholic priest and Abbot of Marienfeld
- Henk Nieuwkamp (born 1942), Dutch retired cyclist
- Harry Peeters (1931–2012), Dutch historian, psychologist and academic
- Heinrich Petraeus (1589–1620), German physician and writer
- Henricus Petrus (1508–1579), Swiss printer
- Henricus Regius (1598–1679), Dutch philosopher, physician and professor of medicine
- Henricus Reneri (1593–1639), Dutch philosopher
- H. G. van de Sande Bakhuyzen (1838–1923), Dutch astronomer
- Henrich Smet (1535 or 1537–1614), also known as Henricus Smetius Alostanus or Henricus Smetius a Leda, Flemish physician and humanist scholar
- Henk van Spaandonck (1913–1982), Dutch footballer
- Henri Estienne (1528 or 1531–1598), also known as Henricus Stephanus, French printer and classical scholar
- Henri Valois (1603–1676), also known as Henricus Valesius, French philologist and historian
- Rick VandenHurk (born 1985), Dutch baseball pitcher in Japan
- Henricus van de Wetering (1850–1929), Dutch Archbishop of Utrecht and Primate of the Netherlands
- Henricus Franciscus Wiertz (1784–1858), painter from the Northern Netherlands
- Hendrick Zwaardecroon (1667–1728), Governor-General of the Dutch East Indies
