= Ints =

Latvian masculine given name

- Gender: Male

Origin
- Region of origin: Latvia

Other names
- Related names: Indriķis, Ingus, Henry

Ints is a Latvian masculine given name. It is a short form of Indriķis, the Latvian form of Henry, and may refer to:

- Ints Cālītis (born 1931), Latvian politician and former political prisoner
- Ints Dālderis (born 1971), Latvian clarinetist and politician, Minister of Culture of Latvia
- Ints Ķuzis (born 1962), Latvian policeman, police general and former commander in-chief of Latvian Police
- Ints Teterovskis (born 1972), Latvian conductor
