= Genrikh =

Genrikh (Cyrillic: Генрих) is a masculine Russian given name derived from the Germanic name Heinrich, a variant of Henry. Notable people with the name include:

- Genrich Altshuller (1926–1998), Soviet engineer, inventor and scientist, journalist and writer
- Genrikh Borovik (born 1929), Russian publicist, writer, playwright and filmmaker, the father of journalist Artyom Borovik
- Genrikh Fedosov (1932–2005), Soviet football player
- Genrikh Gasparyan (1910–1995), Armenian chess player, composer and writer
- Genrikh Graftio, Russian/Soviet engineer credited as a pioneer of the hydroelectric station construction, one of the founders of the GOELRO plan
- Genrikh Lyushkov (1900–1945), officer in the Soviet secret police NKVD and its highest-ranking defector
- Genrikh Manizer (1889–1917), Russian ethnographer
- Genrikh Novozhilov, Soviet and Russian aircraft designer, key designer of multiple Ilyushin passenger aircraft including the Il-18, Il-62, Il-76, and Il-96
- Genrikh Sapgir (1928–1999), Russian poet and fiction writer
- Genrikh Sidorenkov (1931–1990), Russian ice hockey player
- Genrikh Sretenski (born 1962), Russian ice dancer
- Genrikh Yagoda (1891–1938), Soviet secret police official who served as director of the NKVD, the Soviet Union's security and intelligence agency, one of the perpetrators of the Great Purge and Holodomor
