= Heinrici =

Heinrici is a surname and less commonly a given name. It is a variant of Henry. People with the surname include:

- Georg Heinrici (1844–1915), German Protestant theologian
- Gotthard Heinrici (1886–1971), Prussian general in the German Army during the Second World War
- Louis Heinrici (1847–1930), German builder of hot air engines

== See also ==
- Henrici
