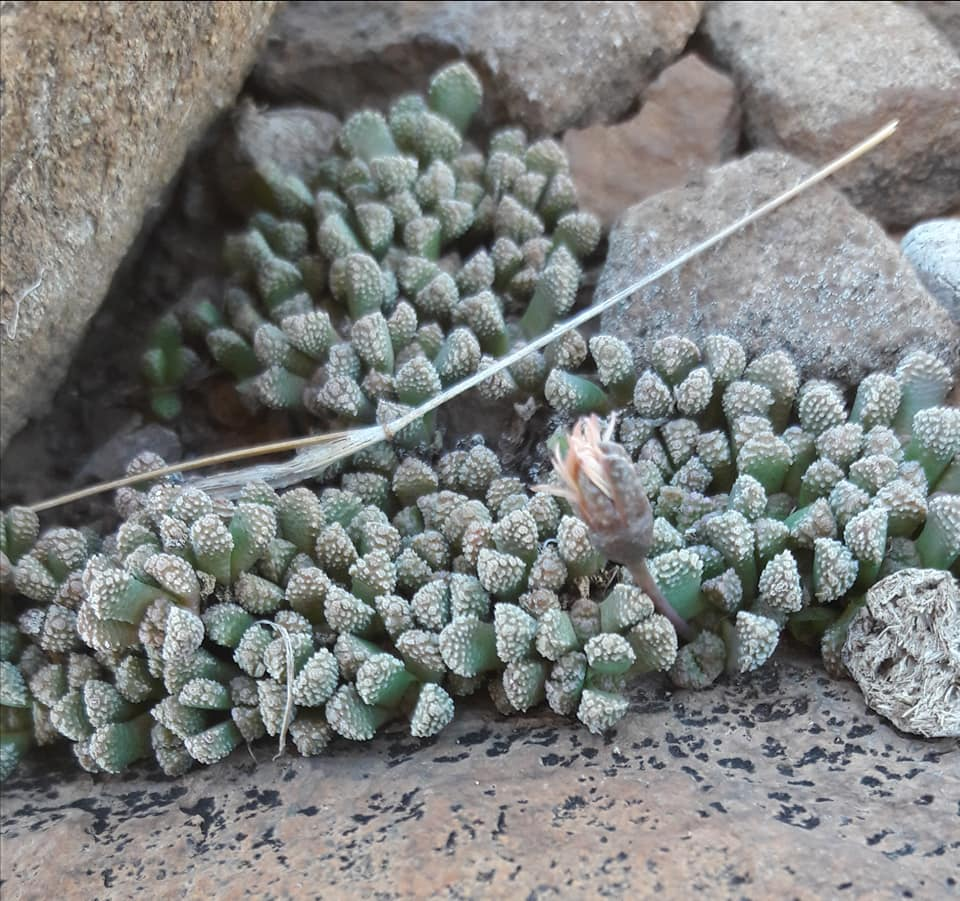
- In a natural setting

Scientific classification
- Kingdom: Plantae
- Clade: Embryophytes
- Clade: Tracheophytes
- Clade: Angiosperms
- Clade: Eudicots
- Order: Caryophyllales
- Family: Aizoaceae
- Genus: Neohenricia
- Species: N. sibbettii

Binomial name
- Neohenricia sibbettii (L.Bolus) L.Bolus

Synonyms
- Mesembryanthemum sibbettii L.Bolus

= Neohenricia sibbettii =

Species of flowering plant

Neohenricia sibbettii, called the coral plant, is a species of flowering plant in the genus Neohenricia, native to the Cape Provinces and Free State of South Africa. A succulent, it has gained the Royal Horticultural Society's Award of Garden Merit.
