= Hindrek =

Estonian male given name

- Gender: Male
- Language: Estonian
- Name day: 10 April

Origin
- Origin: From the German given name Heinrich
- Region of origin: Estonia

Other names
- Related names: Hendrik, Indrek, Ints

Hindrek is an Estonian masculine given name. It is a cognate of the foreign names Heinrich, Henry and Henri. Hendrik and Indrek are common Estonian variants of the name Hindrek.

As of 1 January 2020, 160 men in Estonia have the first name Hindrek, making it the 501st most popular male name in the country. People bearing the names Hindrek include:

- Hindrek Kesler (born 1958), architect
- Hindrek Meri (1934–2009), statesman
- Hindrek Ojamaa (born 1995), footballer
- Hindrek Older (born 1938), agronomist
- Hindrek Pulk (born 1990), volleyball player
