= Neohenricia spiculata =

Scientific classification
- Kingdom: Plantae
- Clade: Embryophytes
- Clade: Tracheophytes
- Clade: Spermatophytes
- Clade: Angiosperms
- Clade: Eudicots
- Order: Caryophyllales
- Family: Aizoaceae
- Genus: Neohenricia
- Species: N. spiculata

Binomial name
- Neohenricia spiculata S.A.Hammer

Species of plant

Neohenricia spiculata is a small succulent plant that is part of the Aizoaceae family. The species is endemic to South Africa and occurs in the Eastern Cape at Andriesberg. The plant has a range of less than 5 km^{2}, is considered rare and has no threats.
