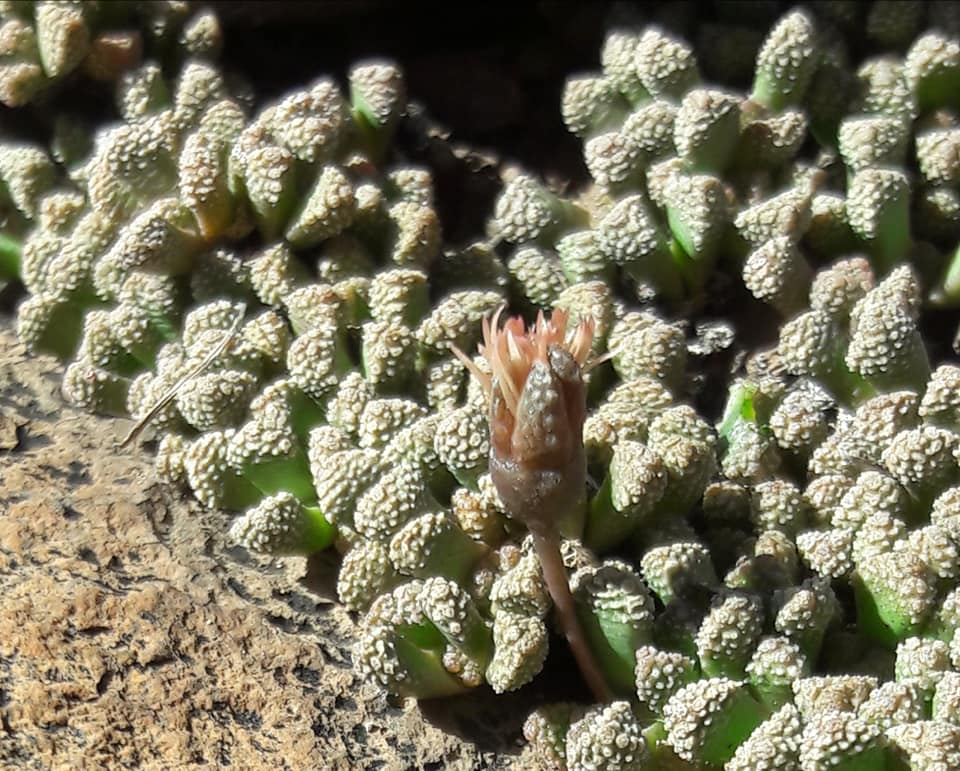
- Neohenricia sibbettii

Scientific classification
- Kingdom: Plantae
- Clade: Embryophytes
- Clade: Tracheophytes
- Clade: Angiosperms
- Clade: Eudicots
- Order: Caryophyllales
- Family: Aizoaceae
- Subfamily: Ruschioideae
- Tribe: Ruschieae
- Genus: Neohenricia; L.Bolus

Species
- See text

Synonyms
- Henricia L.Bolus

= Neohenricia =

Genus of flowering plants

Neohenricia is a genus of flowering plants in the family Aizoaceae, native to the Cape Provinces and Free State of South Africa. Low-lying succulents, they are found in places that can collect a little water, such as crevices and pans, on sandstone or dolorite, in areas that get at least 200 mm of rainfall annually.

The genus was named after Swiss-born South African plant physiologist Marguerite Gertrud Anna Henrici.

== Species ==
Currently accepted species include:

- Neohenricia sibbettii (L.Bolus) L.Bolus
- Neohenricia spiculata S.A.Hammer
