= Ingus (name) =

- Gender: Male
- Name day: 11 June

Origin
- Region of origin: Latvia

Other names
- Related names: Indriķis, Ints, Henry

Ingus or Inguss is a Latvian masculine given name. It is a variant of Indriķis, the Latvian form of Henry and may refer to:

- Ingus Bankevics (born 1985), Latvian professional basketball player
- Ingus Baušķenieks (born 1956), Latvian musician (Dzeltenie Pastnieki)
- Ingus Jakovičs (born 1993), Latvian basketball player
- Ingus Janevics (born 1986), Latvian race walker and Olympic competitor
- Ingus Pētersons (born 1959), Latvian opera singer
- Ingus Veips (born 1969), Latvian cyclist
