= Henricus Reneri =

Dutch philosopher

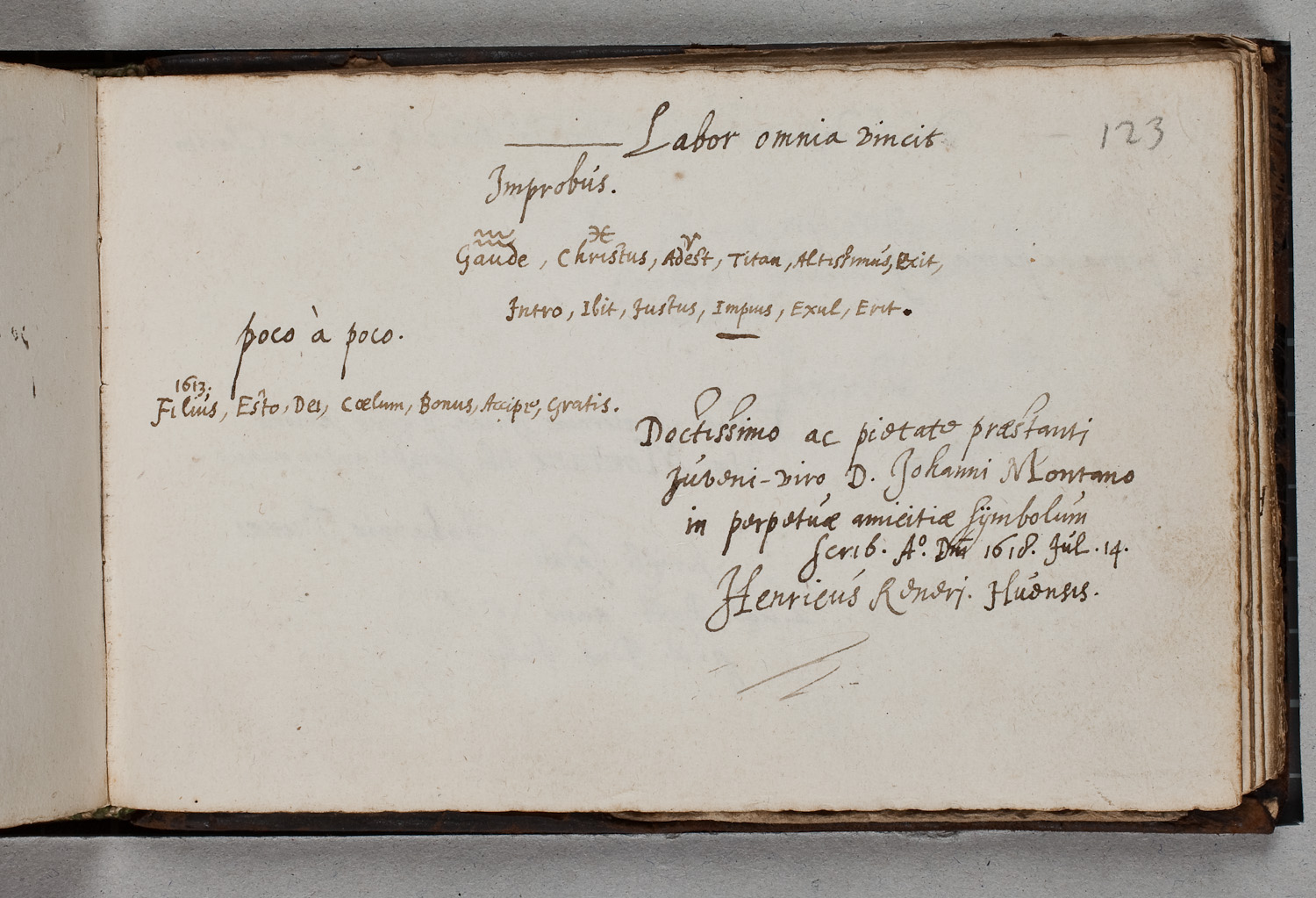
Writing by Henricus Reneri

Henricus Reneri or Renerius (1593, Huy – 20 March 1639, Utrecht) was a Dutch philosopher.

== Life ==
Reneri was born at Huy in the Prince-Bishopric of Liège in 1593. He studied liberal arts at the University of Leuven and attended the Grand Séminaire of Liège. After his conversion to Calvinism in 1616 he went to the Dutch Republic. He studied theology at the Collège Wallon at Leiden, but he broke off his studies in 1621. The following ten years Reneri worked as a private tutor to the children of several Amsterdam merchant-regents, including Adriaan Pauw. In the meantime he studied medicine at Leiden University. In 1631 he found a position as professor of philosophy at the illustrious school of Deventer, the Illustre Gymnasium. From 1634 he held the same chair at the newly founded illustrious school of Utrecht, which was raised to the status of university in 1636. He died only three years later, at the age of 46.

Reneri mainly taught scholastic logic and natural philosophy. Apart from his professorship, he worked on a method of his own in the Ramist tradition. This method met especially with much enthusiasm within the Hartlib circle, the European network around the English pansophist Samuel Hartlib. Furthermore, Reneri was engaged in experiments and inventions in the fields of optics, thermometers, water clocks, alchemy and natural magic.

Reneri was one of the best friends of René Descartes and an admirer of his philosophy. They met during the winter of 1628-1629 and Descartes followed Reneri to Deventer and Utrecht. Reneri is reported to have read the Discours de la Méthode and the accompanying Essais (including La Géométrie) publicly in his classes. Nevertheless, Reneri is not to be regarded as a Cartesian philosopher, since his works show little Cartesian influences.

What survives are an inaugural address, several disputations which were presided by him, and a correspondence of more than sixty letters with leading scholars, philosophers, theologians, diplomats and poets from the Republic and abroad, such as André Rivet, Constantijn Huygens, Pierre Gassendi and Pieter Corneliszoon Hooft.

== Works ==
- "De lectionibus ac exercitiis philosophicis", Reneri's inaugural address at the illustrious school of Utrecht
