= Henry Bender (bookseller) =

German Jewish bookseller

Henry Bender (fl. 1850s-1860s) was a German Jewish bookseller, newspaper publisher, and stamp dealer in Victorian London who became associated with Karl Marx and Frederick Engels.

Bender is thought to have arrived in London in the late 1850s, possibly from Coburg. He established a bookselling business and also imported foreign newspapers for distribution in Britain, as a result of which he was noticed by Karl Marx and Frederick Engels and is mentioned in their correspondence. Stamps were issued by Bender but their status is uncertain. Robson Lowe identified three stamps which he classified as HB1, HB2 and HB3 which he thought were for parcel use. In September 1863, Bender established a newspaper for Germans in London, the Londoner Anzeiger, which in 1865 published a review by Marx of Engels' "The Prussian military question and the German workers party". He operated from 8 Little Newport Street, now in London's Chinatown, and is listed in trade directories there from 1860 to 1865.
