= Henry II =

Henry II may refer to:

== Kings ==
- Saint Henry II, Holy Roman Emperor (972–1024), crowned King of Germany in 1002, of Italy in 1004 and Emperor in 1014
- Henry II of England (1133–1189), reigned from 1154
- Henry II of Jerusalem and Cyprus (1271–1324), reigned from 1285; king of Jerusalem in name only from 1291
- Henry II of Castile (1334–1379), reigned 1366–1367 and from 1369
- Henry VI of England (1421–1471), reigned 1422–1461 and from 1470 as a King of England, and reigned from 1422 to 1453 as Henry II, king of France
- Henry II of Navarre (1503–1555), reigned from 1518
- Henry II of France (1519–1559), reigned from 1547
- Henry II of Sicily (also known as Henry II, Duke of Swabia and Henry (VII) of Germany), king of Germany (Rex romanorum) and of Sicily (1211–1242)

== Others ==
- Henry II of Bavaria (951–995)
- Henry II of Louvain (d. 1071)
- Henry II, Duke of Carinthia, better known as Henry of Eppenstein (1090–1122)
- Henry II of Meissen (1103–1123)
- Henry II, Duke of Saxony, better known as Henry the Proud, also Henry X of Bavaria (1108–1139)
- Henry II of Austria (1107–1177)
- Henry II of Champagne (1166–1197)
- Henry II the Pious, Piast Duke of Silesia-Wrocław, Kraków and Southern Greater Poland (ca. 1196 – 9 April 1241)
- Henry II, Count of Sayn (1202–1246)
- Henry II of Brabant (1207–1248)
- Henry II of Nassau (d. 1251)
- Henry II of Anhalt-Aschersleben (d. 1266)
- Henry II of Mecklenburg (1266–1329)
- Henry II, Duke of Świdnica (1316–1345)
- Henry II of Brunswick-Grubenhagen (d. after 1351)
- Henry II of Hesse (d. 1376)
- Henry II, Duke of Münsterberg (c. 1396–1420)
- Henry II, Duke of Münsterberg-Oels (1507–1548)
- Henry II of Lorraine (1563–1624)
- Henry II, Count of Reuss-Gera (1572–1635)
- Henri II de Montmorency (1595–1632)
- Henri II, Prince of Condé (1588–1646)
- Henri II, Duke of Guise (1614–1664)
- Jacques-Victor Henry, Prince Royal of Haiti, pretender to the throne of Haiti as Henry II (1820)
