= Henning Braunisch =

American electrical engineer

Henning Braunisch is an electrical engineer who works for Intel. Braunisch was named a Fellow of the Institute of Electrical and Electronics Engineers (IEEE) in 2016 for his contributions to high-bandwidth microprocessor packaging.
