= 826 Henrika =

Background asteroid

Discovery
- Discovered by: M. F. Wolf
- Discovery site: Heidelberg Obs.
- Discovery date: 28 April 1916

Designations
- Named after: unknown
- Alternative designations: A916 HD · 1930 MG; 1934 HE · 1935 SW_{1} 1948 PJ_{1} · 1957 QC; 1962 UK · 1962 VC; 1916 ZO
- Minor planet category: main-belt · (middle); background

Orbital characteristics
- Epoch 31 May 2020 (JD 2459000.5)
- Uncertainty parameter 0
- Observation arc: 103.52 yr (37,809 d)
- Aphelion: 3.2705 AU
- Perihelion: 2.1532 AU
- Semi-major axis: 2.7119 AU
- Eccentricity: 0.2060
- Orbital period (sidereal): 4.47 yr (1,631 d)
- Mean anomaly: 51.962°
- Mean motion: 0° 13^{m} 14.52^{s} / day
- Inclination: 7.1048°
- Longitude of ascending node: 230.22°
- Argument of perihelion: 36.697°

Physical characteristics
- Mean diameter: 19.28±2.3 km; 21.83±0.43 km; 22.556±0.258 km
- Synodic rotation period: 5.9846±0.0001 h (Note: Lightcurve plot of (826) Henrika, by Frederick Pilcher (2010). Rotation period 5.9846±0.0001 hours with a brightness amplitude of 0.26±0.02 mag. Quality code of 3. Summary figures and more information at the ASLC website and at the LCDB.)
- Geometric albedo: 0.114±0.005; 0.1435±0.042; 0.166±0.025
- Spectral type: SMASS = C; undefined (MOVIS)
- Absolute magnitude (H): 11.6

826 Henrika (prov. designation: A916 HD or 1916 ZO) is a background asteroid from the central regions of the asteroid belt. It was discovered by German astronomer Max Wolf at the Heidelberg-Königstuhl State Observatory on 28 April 1916. The carbonaceous C-type asteroid has a rotation period of 5.98 hours and measures approximately 21 kilometers (13 miles) in diameter. Any reference to the origin of the asteroid's name is unknown.

== Orbit and classification ==
Henrika is a non-family asteroid of the main belt's background population when applying the hierarchical clustering method to its proper orbital elements. It orbits the Sun in the central asteroid belt at a distance of 2.2–3.3 AU once every 4 years and 6 months (1,631 days; semi-major axis of 2.71 AU). Its orbit has an eccentricity of 0.21 and an inclination of 7° with respect to the ecliptic. The body's observation arc begins at Heidelberg Observatory on 2 July 1921, more than five years after its official discovery observation.

== Naming ==
Any reference of this minor planet's name to a person or occurrence is unknown.

=== Unknown meaning ===
Among the many thousands of named minor planets, Henrika is one of 120 asteroids for which no official naming citation has been published. All of these asteroids have low numbers, the first one being 164 Eva. The last asteroid with a name of unknown meaning is 1514 Ricouxa. They were discovered between 1876 and the 1930s, predominantly by astronomers Auguste Charlois, Johann Palisa, Max Wolf and Karl Reinmuth.

== Physical characteristics ==
In the Bus–Binzel SMASS classification, Henrika is a common, carbonaceous C-type asteroid, with an untypically high albedo (see below) for such spectral class. In a taxonomic classification based on MOVIS near-infrared colors, Henrika could not be assigned a final class and was labelled as undefined (U).

=== Rotation period ===
In April 210, a rotational lightcurve of Henrika was obtained from six nights of photometric observations by Frederick Pilcher at the Organ Mesa Observatory (G50) in New Mexico. Analysis of the classically shaped bimodal lightcurve gave a well-defined rotation period of 5.9846±0.0001 hours with a brightness variation of 0.26±0.02 magnitude (U=3). During the same apparition, a virtually identical period of 5.9840±0.0003 hours with an amplitude of 0.26±0.02 magnitude (U=3) was determined by Kenda Albers and colleges of the Rose-Hulman Institute of Technology at the Oakley Southern Sky Observatory (E09) in Australia.

=== Diameter and albedo ===
According to the surveys carried out by the Infrared Astronomical Satellite IRAS, and the Japanese Akari satellite, and the NEOWISE mission of NASA's Wide-field Infrared Survey Explorer (WISE), Henrika measures (19.28±2.3), (21.83±0.43) and (22.556±0.258) kilometers in diameter and its surface has an albedo of (0.1435±0.042), (0.114±0.005) and (0.166±0.025), respectively.

Alternative mean-diameters published by the WISE team include (14.92±4.26 km), (20.44±0.58 km) and (24.119±0.254 km) with corresponding albedos of (0.14±0.16), (0.07±0.01) and (0.0917±0.0172). The Collaborative Asteroid Lightcurve Link derives an albedo of 0.1103 and a diameter of 19.15 kilometers based on an absolute magnitude of 11.6. An asteroid occultations of Henrika from 19 January 2010, gave a best-fit ellipse dimension of (19.0 km × 19.0 km). These timed observations are taken when the asteroid passes in front of a distant star.
