= Henry XI =

Henry XI may refer to:

- Henry XI of Głogów (ca. 1435–1476)
- Henry XI of Legnica (1539–1588)
- Heinrich XI, Prince Reuss of Greiz (1722–1800)
