= Thomaz Henrique =

Brazilian politician (born 1990)

- Henrique in 2024

Member of the Legislative Assembly of São Paulo
- Incumbent
- Assumed office 1 February 2027

Personal details
- Born: 14 December 1990 (age 35)
- Party: Liberal Party

Thomaz Henrique Barbosa da Silva (born 14 December 1990) is a Brazilian politician who was elected member of the Legislative Assembly of São Paulo in 2026. He has been a municipal councillor of São José dos Campos since 2021.
