= Henry X =

Henry X may refer to:

- Henry the Proud (Henry X), Duke of Bavaria
- Henry X, Count of Reuss-Lobenstein
- Heinrich X, Count of Reuss-Ebersdorf
