= Henrique (disambiguation) =

Henrique is a given name. It may also refer to:

- Adam Henrique (born 1990), Canadian ice hockey player
- Luis Henrique (fighter) (born 1993), Brazilian mixed martial artist
- Thomaz Henrique (born 1990), Brazilian politician
- Henrique, São Tomé and Príncipe, a village

== See also ==
- Henrike, a feminine given name
- Henriques (disambiguation)
