= Henry I =

Henry I or Henri I may refer to:

In chronological order

- Henry the Fowler, King of Germany (876–936)
- Henry I, Duke of Bavaria (died 955)
- Henry I of Austria, Margrave of Austria (died 1018)
- Henry I of France (1008–1060)
- Henry the Long, Margrave of the Nordmark (c. 1065–1087)
- Henry I of England (1068–1135)
- Henry I, Margrave of the Saxon Ostmark (1070–1103)
- Henry I of Champagne (1127–1181), Count of Champagne
- Henry I the Bearded, Duke of Poland (1163–1238)
- Henry I of Brabant (1165–1235)
- Henry I of Kuenring (1185-1233)
- Henry I of Castile (1204–1217)
- Henry I of Cyprus (1217–1253)
- Henry I of Hesse, Landgrave of Hesse (1244–1308)
- Henry I of Navarre (1244–1274)
- Henry I, Prince of Mecklenburg-Güstrow (c. 1245–1291)
- Henry I of Jawor (1292/96 – by 1346)
- Henry I of Ziębice (c. 1350–after 8 August 1366)
- Henry, King of Portugal (1512–1580)
- Henri I de Montmorency (1534–1614)
- Henri I, Duke of Nemours (1572–1632)
- Henri I, Duke of Guise (1550–1588)
- Henry I, Duke of Münsterberg-Oels (1448–1498)
- Henri I, Prince of Condé (1552–1588)
- Henri Christophe, aka Henry I of Haiti (1767–1820)
- Puyi, aka Henry Puyi, Emperor of China (1906-1967)
