= Indulis =

Latvian male given name

- Gender: Male
- Name day: 2 January

Origin
- Meaning: gift
- Region of origin: Latvia

Indulis is a Latvian masculine given name, borne by more than 1,000 men in Latvia. Its nameday is celebrated on 2 January.

The name has two possible derivations, one from a Baltic word meaning "gift", and the other as a diminutive of Indriķis, the Latvian form of Heinrich.

Indulis was the name of the hero of the legend of Indulis and Ārija, the Latvian Romeo and Juliet, set in the 13th century during the German conquest, which relates the tragic love of Indulis, a Curonian chieftain, and Ārija, daughter of a German military commander. The name was revived, along with many other medieval names, in the late 19th century, and was brought to especial prominence by the poet and dramatist Rainis with the publication in 1911 of his play "Indulis un Ārija".

As a modern name, Indulis is better-known than many Latvian names because of Indulis Emsis, Prime Minister of Latvia in 2004, the first Green head of state in the world.

Notable people with the name Indulis include:

- Indulis Bekmanis (born 1989), Latvian professional road cyclist
- Indulis Bērziņš (born 1957), Latvian politician
- Indulis Bikše (born 1995), Latvian cross-country skier
- Indulis Emsis (born 1952), Latvian biologist and politician, 18th Prime Minister of Latvia
