= Ennio =

- Gender: Male

Origin
- Region of origin: Italy

Ennio is a given name. Notable people with the name include:

== People ==
=== Academics ===
- Ennio Candotti (1942–2023), Italy-born Brazilian physicist
- Ennio De Giorgi (1928–1996), Italian mathematician
- Ennio Quirino Visconti (1751–1818), Italian archaeologist

=== Clergy ===
- Ennio Antonelli (b. 1936), Italian Cardinal of the Roman Catholic Church
- Ennio Filonardi (1466–1549), Italian bishop and Cardinal of the Roman Catholic Church

=== Musicians ===
- Ennio Bolognini (1893–1979), Argentina-born US musician
- Ennio Morricone (1928–2020), Italian composer
  - Ennio, a 2021 documentary about his life

=== Performers ===
- Ennio Balbo (1922–1989), Italian film actor
- Enio Girolami (1935–2013), Italian film and television actor
- Ennio Marchetto (b. 1960), Italian comedian

=== Others ===
- Ennio Capasa (b. 1960), Italian fashion designer
- Ennio De Concini (1923–2008), Italian screenwriter and film director
- Ennio Doris (1940–2021), Italian businessman
- Ennio Falco (b. 1968), Italian sports shooter
- Ennio Flaiano (1910–1972), Italian screenwriter, playwright and author
- Ennio Mattarelli (1928–2026), Italian sports shooter and Olympic Champion
- Ennio Torresan Jr. (b. 1963), Brazilian–American animator

== Fictional characters ==
- "Ennio the Legend", also known as Spot, is a major supporting character in the computer game Tass Times in Tonetown
- "Ennio Salieri", often referred to as Don Salieri, a central character in the crime action adventure game Mafia: Definitive Edition, a game which is a remake of Mafia.

== See also ==
- Ennius, the original Latin form of the name
- Ennius of East Anglia
- Einion, a Welsh form of the related Latin name Ennianus
