= Indrek Siska =

Estonian footballer

Personal information
- Full name: Indrek Siska
- Date of birth: 14 May 1984 (age 42)
- Place of birth: Estonia
- Height: 1.84 m (6 ft 0 in)
- Positions: Midfielder; forward

Team information
- Current team: BSC Solothurn

International career
Years	Team	Apps	(Gls)
2007–?	Estonia (beach soccer)	16	(28)
2008–2011	Estonia (futsal)	7	(1)

Indrek Siska (born 14 May 1984) is a retired Estonian professional beach soccer midfielder and striker, who played in Swiss club BSC Solothurn.

His previous club were Estonian Augur and Israeli Kfar Qassem BS Club.

He was also the member of Estonia national beach soccer team. He is the team's top scorer with 28 goals in 16 games.

He was given a life-long ban in 2014 for match-fixing.

== Achievements ==
=== Beach soccer ===
==== Club ====
Estonian Cup

- Winner 2010

Rannajalgpalli Meistriliiga

- Champion 2007, 2012
- Runner-up 2008, 2009

==== National team ====
- All-time top scorer (28 goals)

==== Individual ====
- Champions league top goal scorer 2008
- Rannajalgpalli Meistriliiga top goalscorer 2008
- Estonian best beach soccer player 2008
- Rannajalgpalli Meistriliiga top goalscorer 2009
- Rannajalgpalli Meistriliiga top goalscorer 2010
- Rannajalgpalli Meistriliiga top goalscorer 2012
- Estonian best beach soccer player 2012

=== Futsal ===
==== Club ====
Saalijalgpalli Meistriliiga

- Champion 2008
- Runner-up 2010

==== National team ====
- Top goal scorer 2008
