= Henry VIII (disambiguation) =

Henry VIII was King of England (and Lord/King of Ireland) from 1509 to his death in 1547.

Henry VIII or Henry 8 may also refer to:

== People ==
- Henry VIII, Duke of Bavaria or Henry IV, Holy Roman Emperor (1050–1106)
- Henry VIII, Count of Waldeck (1465–1513), count of Waldeck and the founder of the older line of Waldeck-Wildungen
- Henry VIII the Sparrow (c. 1357–1397), Polish duke and ruler
- Henry VIII, Duke of Brunswick-Wolfenbüttel, state leader in 1499
- Henry VIII, Duke of Silesia (d. 1423), European noble
- Henry VIII of Brunswick, European noble
- Henry VIII of Henneberg, son-in-law of Anne of Austria, Margravine of Brandenburg
- Henry VIII of Henneberg-Schleusingen, great-grandfather of Frederick II, Elector of Saxony

== Schools ==
- King Henry VIII School, Coventry, England
- King Henry VIII Grammar School, Abergavenny, Wales
- King Henry VIII Grammar School, Warwick, Warwick, England

== Other uses ==
- Henry VIII (play), a 1613 play by Shakespeare (and John Fletcher)
- Henry VIII (film), a 1911 British silent film
- Henry VIII (opera), an 1883 opera by Camille Saint-Saëns
- Henry VIII (TV serial), a 2003 ITV drama
- Henry VIII Hotel, a Tudor Revival architecture hotel located near St. Louis, Missouri

== See also ==
- Henry VIII clauses (also known as Henry VIII powers), a UK statutory instrument that enables legislation to be modified without parliamentary approval
- "I'm Henery the Eighth, I Am", a 1910 song made popular by music hall singer Harry Champion and later Herman's Hermits
