= Henry IX =

Henry IX may refer to:

== People ==
- Henry IX, Duke of Bavaria (1075–1126), also called the Black
- Henry IX of Lubin (1369 – between 1419 and 1420)
- Henryk IX Starszy (c. 1389 – 1467), Duke of Żagań-Głogó
- Heinrich IX, Count Reuss of Köstritz (1711–1780)
- Henry, Duke of Cornwall (1511), who would have been Henry IX
- Henry Frederick, Prince of Wales (1594–1612), the "would-be" King Henry IX
- Henry Benedict Stuart (1725–1807), Jacobite claimant to the throne of England, Scotland and Ireland as "Henry IX and I"
- Henry Dundas, 1st Viscount Melville (1742–1811), nicknamed "Henry IX" for his personal power in Scotland

== Fictional characters ==
- Ruler of the United Kingdom in the 2003 Martin Amis novel Yellow Dog
- Son of Henry VIII and king of England in the 1976 Kingsley Amis novel The Alteration
- Ruling monarch of a Nazi-occupied Britain in the 2003 Harry Turtledove novel In the Presence of Mine Enemies
- An illegitimate son of Queen Elizabeth I in the Japanese anime television series Code Geass
- The titular monarch in the 2017 British television sitcom Henry IX
