= Indriķis =

Given name

- Gender: Male

Origin
- Region of origin: Latvia

Other names
- Related names: Ingus, Inguss, Ints, Henrijs, Henry

Indriķis is a Latvian masculine given name. It is the Latvian form of Henry and may refer to:

- Indriķis Alunāns, young Latvian and journalist
- Indriķis Blankenburgs, Latvian architect
- Indriķis Jurko, Latvian General and military officer, one of the principal commanders of Battle of Jelgava (1944)
- Indriķis Laube, German-Latvian translator and writer
- Indriķis Muižnieks, Latvian scholar and professor
- Indriķis Pūliņš, Latvian sailor and ship building engineer
- Indriķis Šterns, Latvian historian
- Indriķis Zeberiņš, Latvian painter
- Indriķis Zīle, first Latvian Song and Dance Festival director and composer
- Indriķis Zvejnieks, Latvian revolutionary
