= Américo Ruffino =

Argentine footballer

Personal information
- Date of birth: July 27, 1905
- Place of birth: Buenos Aires, Argentina
- Date of death: 4 July 1988 (aged 82)
- Place of death: Buenos Aires, Argentina
- Position(s): Winger
192?–1928	Albese	?	(?)
1928–1929	Torino	6	(1)
1929–1934	Palermo	135	(32)
1934–1935	Juventus Trapani	?	(?)
1935–1936	Potenza	?	(?)

Américo Ruffino (27 July 1905 – 4 July 1988) was an Argentine football player. Ruffino spent the vast majority of his career with the Palermo team.

A winger, he scored the first Serie A goal in the history of the Sicilian team (1932–33 season, Lazio-Palermo 1-1).
