= Henry Krtschil =

German composer (1932–2020)

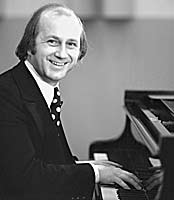

Background information
- Born: 3 October 1932 Dresden, Germany
- Died: 7 July 2020 (aged 87) Berlin
- Genres: Film score
- Occupation(s): Film composer, music producer
- Instrument: Piano
- Years active: 1956–1999

Henry Krtschil (3 October 1932 – 7 July 2020) was a German composer, music producer and pianist. He worked for 25 years as a film composer for Deutscher Fernsehfunk and over 30 years with the German singer Gisela May.

Krtschil studied music between 1951 and 1956 at Hochschule für Musik "Hanns Eisler". Then he was a Répétiteur for one year at Staatliche Ballettschule Berlin and until 1970 at Berliner Ensemble. Between 1970 and 1977 he worked at the theatre Volksbühne. From 1991 until his retirement in 1999 he worked as a composer and pianist at Theater im Palais.

== Selected filmography ==
- 1965: Schule der Frauen
- 1972: Der Mann seiner Frau
- 1977: Der Stein des Glücks
- 1978: Polizeiruf 110: Doppeltes Spiel
- 1978: Rentner haben niemals Zeit
- 1980: Abenteuer mit den Abrafaxen
- 1982: Der Hase und der Igel
- 1982: Geschichten übern Gartenzaun
- 1985: Der verzauberte Weihnachtsmann
- 1987: Der Hauptmann von Köpenick
- 1987: Polizeiruf 110: Die letzte Kundin
- 1989: Die Irrfahrten des Weihnachtsmannes
