= Henning Jensen (disambiguation) =

Henning Jensen (1949–2017) was a Danish football striker, who played 21 national team games.

Henning Jensen may also refer to:

- Henning Gronemann (born Henning Jensen, 1929–2016), Danish football striker, who played one national team game
- Henning Jensen (footballer, born 1910)
- Henning G. Jensen (born 1950), mayor in Aalborg Municipality
- Henning Munk Jensen (born 1947), Danish football defender, who played 62 national team games
- Henning Jensen (actor) (born 1943), Danish actor
