= Hinrich Siuts =

German folklorist

Christian Hinrich Siuts (born 21 July 1932) is a German folklorist.

== Life ==
Born in Stargard, Siuts studied folklore, history and German literature at the Ludwig-Maximilians-Universität München, the Eberhard Karls Universität Tübingen and in Kiel. In 1956 he received his doctorate in ethnology from the Christian-Albrechts-Universität zu Kiel.

After his studies, Siuts first worked at the Deutsches Volksliedarchiv, where he mainly recorded and archived traditional songs.

In 1962 he got a job as a research assistant at the Folklore Department of the University of Münster, where he habilitated in 1968 with a thesis on hymnal songs for the calendar festivals. In 1971 he was offered a chair at the Institute for Folklore at the University of Münster.

== Work ==
- Bann und Acht und ihre Grundlagen im Totenglauben. De Gruyter, Berlin 1959 (Zugleich Dissertation at the University of Kiel (1956)
- Die Ansingelieder zu den Kalenderfesten. Ein Beitrag zur Geschichte, Biologie und Funktion des Volksliedes. Schwartz, Göttingen 1968 (at the same time habilitation thesis at the University of Münster)
- Deutsch-niederländische Kulturverflechtungen bei den Ansingeliedern zu den Kalenderfesten. In: Gerhard Heilfurth & Hinrich Siuts (eds.), Europäische Kulturverflechtungen im Bereich der volkstümlichen Überlieferung. Festschrift zum 65. Geburtstag von Bruno Schiers, Göttingen 1967, p. 203-228.
- Bäuerliche und handwerkliche Arbeitsgeräte in Westfalen : die alten Geräte der Landwirtschaft und des Landhandwerks 1890-1930. Aschendorff, Münster 1982, ISBN 3-402-04126-X
- Bauern und Landhandwerker in Ostfriesland. Eine Darstellung aufgrund der Erhebungen von Bernhard Klocke 1979 – 1984. Museumsdorf Cloppenburg, Cloppenburg 2004

== Literatur ==
- Ruth-Elisabeth Mohrmann: Volkskunde im Spannungsfeld zwischen Universität und Museum. Festschrift for Hinrich Siuts on his 65th birthday. Waxmann, Münster 1997, ISBN 3-89325-498-6 (Beiträge zur Volkskultur in Nordwestdeutschland, vol. 95).
