= Ben Bedini =

American football player and coach (1921–2008)

Biographical details
- Born: December 16, 1921; Ridgefield, Connecticut, U.S.
- Died: December 28, 2008 (aged 87); Raleigh, North Carolina, U.S.

Playing career
- 1939–1942: Springfield

Coaching career (HC unless noted)
- 1947–1953: Housatonic Valley Regional HS (CT)
- 1954–1961: Rye HS (NY)
- 1963: Port Chester HS (NY)
- 1965–1969: Iona
- 1970–1972: Fordham (OC)

Head coaching record
- Overall: 26–9–1 (college club); 95–6 (high school)

Accomplishments and honors

Championships
- National club football (1967)

Americo Anthony "Ben" Bedini (December 16, 1921 – December 28, 2008) was an American football player and coach. He served as the first head football coach at Iona College in New Rochelle, New York from 1965 to 1969. His 1967 squad captured the club football national championship.

== Head coaching record ==
=== College club ===
| Year | Team | Overall | Conference | Standing | Bowl/playoffs |
|---|---|---|---|---|---|
Iona Gaels () (1965–1969)
| 1965 | Iona | 3–1 | | | |
| 1966 | Iona | 4–1–1 | | | |
| 1967 | Iona | 10–0 | | | |
| 1968 | Iona | 4–3 | | | |
| 1969 | Iona | 5–4 | | | |
| Iona: | | 26–9–1 | | | |
| Total: | | 26–9–1 | | | |
National championship Conference title Conference division title or championship game berth
