= Henry VII =

Henry VII may refer to:

- Henry VII of England (1457–1509), King of England and Lord of Ireland from 1485 until his death in 1509; the founder of the House of Tudor
- Henry VII, Duke of Bavaria (died 1047), count of Luxembourg (as Henry II) from 1026 and duke of Bavaria from 1042 until his death
- Henry (VII) of Germany (1211–1242), King of Sicily from 1212, Duke of Swabia from 1216, and King of Germany from 1220
- Henry VII, Holy Roman Emperor (c. 1273–1313), King of Germany from 1308 and Holy Roman Emperor from 1312
- Henry VII, Count of Schwarzburg-Blankenburg (13th-century–1324), also known as Henry VI, the ruling Count of Schwarzburg-Blankenburg from 1285 until his death
- Henry VII Rumpold (c. 1350–1395), Duke of Żagań-Głogów during 1368–1378 and ruler over half of Głogów, Ścinawa and Bytom Odrzański since 1378
- Henry VII, Count of Waldeck (14th-century–15th-century), Count of Waldeck from 1397 until his death
- Heinrich VII, Prince Reuss of Köstritz (1825–1906)
- Henri, Count of Paris (born 1933) (1933–2019), Orléanist pretender to the French throne as Henry VII
