= Hans-Hinrich Koch =

German producer (born 1970)

- Born: June 5, 1970 (age 55)
- Occupation: Producer

Hans-Hinrich Koch (born 1970 in Göttingen) is a German film producer.

== Prizes and awards ==
- Nominated for the Prix Rose d'Or Award 2008 (“Dem kühlen Morgen entgegen”) 4th Human Rights Film Festival of Paris
- Awarded jury's special prize at the 4th Human Rights Film Festival of Paris (“Nachbarn”)
- Nominated for the Baden-Württemberg prize for best script (“Vom Atmen unter Wasser”)
- Judged “particularly worthwhile" by the Film evaluation authority (FBW) in Wiesbaden (“Vom Atmen unter Wasser”)
- Nominated for the "Deutscher Kamerapreis” in the documentary/documentary film category (“Kauf mich!”)
- Opening film and German contribution to the International Documentary Film Festival Munich in 2003 ("Rey Negro")
- Awarded “Documentary film of the month”, by the Film evaluation authority (FBW) in Wiesbaden (“Schwere Geburt”)
- Nominated for the FIRST STEPS Award 2009 & 2011 in the documentary film category (“Schwere Geburt” & “Kauf mich!”)
- Nominated for the PRIX EUROPA 2014, in the TV Fiction category (“Die Auserwählten”)
- Nominated for the Deutscher Hörfilmpreis (“Die Auserwählten”)
- Awarded “Best Film” at the ZOOM Igualada Festival Barcelona (“Die Auserwählten”)
- Awarded the “Gold World Medal” at the New York Festivals (“Die Auserwählten”)

== Publications and articles ==
- “The Effective mechanisms of international TV series” Wirkungsmechanismen internationaler TV-Serien. In: Uwe Kammann, Jochen Hörisch (Hrsg.): Organisierte Phantasie – Medienwelten im 21. Jahrhundert. Wilhelm Fink Verlag, Paderborn 2014, ISBN 978-3-7705-5699-1.
- Identität und Zuschauernähe – Die Sender brauchen deutsche Serien. Adolf-Grimme-Institut; Festschrift zum 44. Adolf-Grimme-Preis
