= Klaus Henning =

German information scientist

Klaus Henning (born 1945) is a German information scientist. He held the professorship of Information Management in Mechanical Engineering and was director of the Center for Learning and Knowledge Management at RWTH Aachen.

== Professional career ==
Klaus Henning studied electrical engineering and political sciences. He did his doctorate in the field of human-machine-systems. His habilitation dealt with entropy in the field of Systems theory. In the year 1985 he accepted the professorship of Cybernetic Methods at RWTH Aachen, which was renamed to Computer Science in Mechanical Engineering in 1994 and to Information Management in Mechanical Engineering in 2008. Simultaneously, he accepted the management of today’s Center for Learning and Knowledge Management, the former Center of University Didactics at RWTH Aachen. From 2004 to 2008 he was dean of the Faculty of Mechanical Engineering at RWTH Aachen.

Henning is a member of the board of Associated Institute for Management Cybernetics (IfU) e.V. at RWTH Aachen. He was chairman of the supervisory board of Xenium AG in Munich as well as chairman of the board of ABWF in Berlin and he also was a member of the university council of Saarland University.

== Focus of work ==
- Software-(re)engineering of large-scale IT-systems for the automotive industry
- Cybernetics for businesses and Change Management
- Systemic communication- and Organization development;
- Participatory learning processes
- Learning networks and competency development

== Publications ==
- Die Kunst der kleinen Lösung. Murmann Verlag, Hamburg 2014, ISBN 978-3-86774-382-2.
- Smart und digital - Wie künstliche Intelligenz unser Leben verändert Springer-Verlag, Berlin Heidelberg 2019, ISBN 978-3-662-59520-6.
- 250 scientific papers, 20 monographs, approx. 30 publications as publisher
