= Henry III =

Henry III may refer to:

- Henry III, Holy Roman Emperor (1017–1056)
- King Henry III of Castile (1379–1406)
- King Henry III of England (1207–1272)
- King Henry III of France (1551–1589)
- King Henry III of Navarre (1553–1610), also King Henry IV of France
- Henry III, Prince of Anhalt-Aschersleben (died 1307)
- Henry III, Prince of Condé (1643–1709)
- Henry III, Duke of Bavaria (940–989)
- Henry III, Duke of Brabant (c. 1230–1261)
- Henry III, Duke of Brunswick-Grubenhagen (1416–1464)
- Henry III, Duke of Brunswick-Lüneburg (1533–1598)
- Henry III, Duke of Carinthia (1050–1122)
- Henry III, Duke of Głogów (died 1309/60–1309)
- Henry III, Duke of Limburg (1140s–1221)
- Henry III, Duke of Mecklenburg (c. 1337–1383)
- Henry III, Duke of Münsterberg-Oels (1542–1587)
- Henry III, Duke of Saxony (1129–1195)
- Henry III the White (1227–1266), Duke of Wrocław
- Henry III, Landgrave of Upper Hesse (1440–1483)
- Henry III, Margrave of Meissen (1215–1288)
- Henry III, Marquis of Namur (1216–1281)
- Henry III, Count of Bar (1259–1302)
- Henry III, Count of Champagne (1244–1274)
- Henry III, Count of Gorizia (1263–1323)
- Henry III, Count of Holstein-Rendsburg (died 1421)
- Henry III, Count of Louvain (died 1095)
- Henry III, Count of Luxembourg (died 1096)
- Henry III, Count of Sayn (died 1246)
- Henry III, Count of Schauenburg-Holstein (died 1421)
- Henry III of Nassau-Breda (1483–1538)
- Henry III, Lord of Waldeck (died 1267)
