= Inge Henningsen =

Danish statistician (1941–2024)

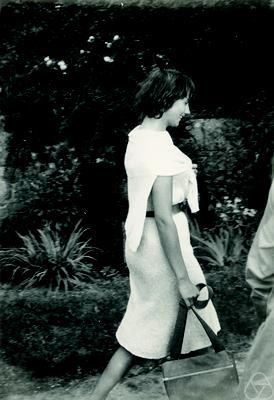
Inge Henningsen

Inge Biehl Henningsen (14 April 1941 – 5 August 2024) was a Danish statistician, academic and writer. A researcher and lecturer at the universities of Copenhagen and Aarhus, she was also active in politics and women's rights, most recently in connection with the PISA approach to student assessment. As editor of the socialist journal Naturkampen in the 1980s, she covered subjects as varied as the management of cancer research and the European Union's approach to agriculture in the third world.

== Biography ==
Born on 14 April 1941 in the Frederiksberg district of Copenhagen, Inge Biehl Henningsen was the daughter of the haberdasher Sven Aage Henningsen (1990–1991) and the correspondent Elisabeth Braunstein (1911–1996). After matriculating from Holte Gymnasium in 1959, she read statistics at Copenhagen University, graduating in 1966.

Henningsen died on 5 August 2024, at the age of 83.

== Career ==
On graduating, Henningsen joined the university's Institut for Matematisk Statistik where she taught and carried out research until 2007, becoming an associate professor in 1974. Her interest in politics started when as an undergraduate she joined the socialist Studentersamfundet (student society). From its establishment in 1967, she was active in the Left Socialists party (Venstresocialisterne), together with her partner Steen Folke, becoming a member of the board and, from the late 1960s, editor of the party's journal Politisk Revy. While on a study trip to the United States (1969–1970), she became involved in the emerging New Women's Movement. On her return to Denmark, she promoted the new women's activities for the Left Socialists in the 1970s. From 1980 to 1991, she was editor of Naturkampen, the socialist organ for women who were critically involved in topics such as science and technology, participating in articles on cancer research, technology risk assessment, third world agriculture and AIDS.

Both in her professional life and in her extramural activities, Henningsen became an effective communicator, interpreting statistical information for non-specialists, frequently criticizing how statistics were being misused. She became particularly active in the educational sphere, demonstrating, for example, how statistics revealed more limited choices for girls than for boys in regard to the applied sciences. She also collaborated with women researchers in sociology, politics and psychology, revealing how women did not enjoy the same opportunities as men in higher education and research. In this connection, in 1998 she became a member of the Gender Equality Research Foundation under the Ministry of Research.

Latterly, on the basis of statistics, she published articles on the extent to which girls are disadvantaged in Denmark's educational environment, but she also pointed out that a fair proportion of boys are increasingly considered to be "losers" in the absence of effective vocational programmes and internships. Other topics she examined with a statistics viewpoint include bullying in the classroom (2009 & 2013), gender and educational choices (2008), and a critical examination of the results of the PISA reports (2008 & 2017).
