= Hynek =

Hynek is a Czech masculine given name and a surname (feminine: Hynková). It originated as a shortened form of the German given name Heinrich. Notable people with the name include:

== Given name ==
- Hynek Bartoň (born 2004), Czech tennis player
- Hynek Berka of Dubá (c. 1297 – 1348), Czech nobleman
- Hynek Bílek (born 1981), Czech ice dancer
- Hynek Blaško (born 1955), Czech military leader and politician
- Hynek Boček of Poděbrady (?–1426), Czech nobleman
- Hynek Bočan (born 1938), Czech film director and screenwriter
- Hynek Čermák (born 1973), Czech actor
- Hynek Fajmon (born 1968), Czech politician
- Hynek Hanza (born 1977), Czech politician
- Hynek Hromada (1935–2012), Czech sport shooter
- Hynek Kmoníček (born 1962), Czech diplomat and politician
- Hynek Krušina of Lichtenburg (1392–1454), Czech military leader
- Karel Hynek Mácha (1810–1836), Czech poet
- Hynek Martinec (1980), Czech-British painter
- Hynek Zohorna (born 1990), Czech ice hockey player

== Surname ==
- Jaroslav Hynek (born 1975, Czech football player and manager
- Jiří Hynek (born 1960), Czech business manager and politician
- Joel Hynek, American visual effects artist
- J. Allen Hynek (1910–1986), American astronomer, professor and ufologist
- Kristián Hynek (born 1980), Czech mountain bike racer

== See also ==
- 1842 Hynek, an asteroid
