= Henry IV =

Henry IV may refer to:

== People ==
- Henry IV, Holy Roman Emperor (1050–1106), King of the Romans and Holy Roman Emperor
- Henry IV, Duke of Limburg (1195–1247)
- Henry IV, Duke of Brabant (1251/1252–1272)
- Henryk IV Probus (c. 1258–1290), Duke of Wrocław
- Henry IV, Count of Bar (1315/20–1344)
- Heinrich IV Dusemer von Arfberg (died 1353), 21st Grand Master of the Teutonic Knights
- Henry IV, Prince of Anhalt-Bernburg (died 1374)
- Henry IV of England (1367–1413), King of England and Lord of Ireland
- Henry IV, Count of Holstein-Rendsburg (1397–1427)
- Henry IV, Duke of Mecklenburg (1417–1477)
- Henry IV of Castile (1425–1474), King of Castile, nicknamed the Impotent
- Henry IV of Neuhaus (1442–1507)
- Henry IV, Duke of Brunswick-Lüneburg (1463–1514), Prince of Wolfenbüttel, nicknamed Henry the Elder or Henry the Evil
- Henry IV, Duke of Saxony (1473–1541)
- Henry IV, Burgrave of Plauen (1510–1554)
- Henry IV of Sayn (1539–1606), cathedral dean and Count of Sayn
- Henry IV of France (1553–1610), King of France and Navarre
- Heinrich IV, Prince Reuss of Köstritz (1919–2012), former head of the German Princely House of Reuss

== Plays ==
- Henry IV, Part 1, by William Shakespeare, referring to Henry IV of England
- Henry IV, Part 2, by William Shakespeare, referring to Henry IV of England
- Henry IV (Pirandello), by Luigi Pirandello, referring to Henry IV, Holy Roman Emperor

== Films ==
- Henry IV (1959 film), a 1959 BBC Television drama film starring Martin Miller, based on the play by Luigi Pirandello
- Henry IV (film), a 1984 Italian film based on the Luigi Pirandello play
- Henri 4 (film), a 2010 film directed by Jo Baier.
- BBC Television Shakespeare Season Two - The First Part of King Henry the Fourth (1979)
- BBC Television Shakespeare Season Two - The Second Part of King Henry the Fourth (1979)

== Other uses ==
- French battleship Henri IV, named after Henri IV of France
- Lycée Henri-IV, public secondary school in Paris
