= Marguerite Gertrud Anna Henrici =

Swiss-born South African plant physiologist

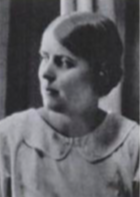
- Born: 22 February 1892; Basle, Switzerland
- Died: 28 July 1971 (aged 79); Bloemfontein, South Africa
- Occupation: plant physiologist

Marguerite Gertrud Anna Henrici (22 February 1892, Basle, Switzerland – 28 July 1971, Bloemfontein, South Africa) was a Swiss-born South African plant physiologist. She is the author of over 80 scientific papers on food value of South African grasses and veld types. She was a member of the South African Association for the Advancement of Science, the South African Biological Society, and an honorary member of the South African Association of Botanist. She is commemorated in the genus names Neohenricia L. Bolus and Salsola henriciae Verd.

== Early life and education ==
Marguerite Gertrud Anna Henrici was born on 22 February 1892 in Basle, Switzerland. In 1913, she entered the University of Basle to study botany, chemistry and zoology. After graduating from the University of Basle in 1917, Henrici was hired by her supervisor Professor Gustav Senn as his private assistant at the Botanical Institute in Basle. During 1920-1922, she was a research worker in the botanical institute of the University of Basle.

== Career ==
In 1921, Henrici accepted a job offer from Arnold Theiler, the founding director of the Veterinary Institute at Ondestepoort in South Africa, whom she first met eight ago being a student at Basle.

In November 1922, Henrici arrived in South Africa to study the seasonal variations of phosphate, a deficiency of which had been shown to cause the disease, in the vegetation of affected areas. She was placed in charge of the Armoedsvlakte field station, in an isolated, semi-arid region adjoining the Kalahari Desert. Henrici's researches on natural pastures included work on chlorophyll, carbohydrates and phosphorus content of grasses, and the cysteine and Sulphur content of Karoo shrubs and grasses.

In 1926, she was elected a member of the South African Association for the Advancement of Science.

In 1927, the University of South Africa awarded Henrici a D.Sc degree for a thesis titled Studies in plant physiology in South Africa and Europe. Dr. Henrici was transferred from the Division of Veterinary Services to the Division of Plant Industry in 1929 and was appointed as Officer in Charge of the Veld Reserve at Fauresmith.

In 1935, Henrici was awarded a Senior Captain Scott medal for outstanding scientific achievements from the South African Biological Society. In 1937, she was a president of the South African Association for the Advancement of Science Section C.

Henrici spent the whole year 1939 on vacation in Europe visiting plant physiological institutes and meeting some of her scientific correspondents.

During the 1940s, she undertook a series of transpiration studies. Henrici accumulated a herbarium of over 6000 specimens, mainly from the western Free State and Ermelo, housed in the National Botanical Institute in Pretoria and in the herbarium of the McGregor Museum, Kimberley, while a set was kept at the veld reserve at Fauresmith.

After reaching retirement age in 1948 Henrici continued her work at Fauresmith in a temporary capacity until March 1957.

After final retirement from the Department of Agriculture, she had bought a property in Fauresmith and stayed there. Poor health eventually forced her to enter a home for the aged in Bloemfontein, where she lived last two years of her life.

In 1968, the farming community of Fauresmith district honored Henrici with an illuminated address.

In 1969, Henrici received an honorary doctorate from the University of Basel, and in 1971 she was made an Honorary Life Member of the South African Association of Botanists.

Marguerite Gertrud Anna Henrici died on 28 July 1971 in Bloemfontein, South Africa.

== Honors ==
The genus Neohenricia L. Bolus and Salsola henriciae Verd., based on her collections, were named in her honor.

== Selected bibliography ==
- Transpiration of grasses and other plants in arid conditions (1926)
- The chlorophyll-content of grasses in Bechuanaland (1926)
- Preliminary report upon the occurrence of hydrocyanic acid in the grasses of Bechuanaland (1927)
- Physiological plant studies in South Africa. Part II. Transpiration of grasses and other plants under arid conditions. Dept. Agric. Union S. Africa (1927)
- Structure of the cortex of grass roots in the more arid regions of South Africa. Sci. Bull. Dept. Agric. Union S. Africa 85:3-12, 1929
- Mineral and feeding stuff analyses of grasses of the Eastern Transvaal Highveld. 16th Report, Veter. Sci. Anim. Industry, Union of South Africa (1930)
- Fodder plants of the Broken Veld (Fauresmith District). Their chemical composition, palatability and carrying capacity. Sci. Bull. Union S. Afr. Dpt. Agric. 11:2, 1935
- Germination of Karoo bush species (1935)
- Digestion experiments with fresh Karoo plants. S. Afr. J.Sci. 41:213-7, 1945
- Transpiration of South African plant associations. Sci. Bull. Dept. Agric. Forestry U. South Africa (1946)
- Effect of excessive water loss and wilting on the life of plants with special reference to Karoo and Lucerne plants (1946)
- Wilting and osmotic phenomena of grasses and other plants in Bechuanaland
- With G. Senn. Chromatophoren und kohlensaure assimilation nicht-grüner Gebapflanzen. Ber. Schweiz. Bot. Ges.
