= Américo Castilla =

Américo Castilla is an Argentinian artist who is the president and founder of Fundación TyPA. Castilla qualified as a lawyer. He was director of the cultural program of Fundación Antorchas from 1992 to 2003, national director of heritage and museums of Argentina from 2003 to 2007, and director of the National Museum of Fine Arts in Buenos Aires from 2005 to 2007. Castilla also teaches at the National University of La Plata.
