= Henning, West Virginia =

- Unincorporated community
- Location within West Virginia Location within the United States
- Coordinates: 37°53′46″N 80°21′35″W
- Country: United States
- State: West Virginia
- County: Greenbrier
- Elevation: 2,234 ft (681 m)
- Time zone: UTC-5 (Eastern (EST))
  - Summer (DST): UTC-4 (EDT)
- Area codes: 304 & 681
- GNIS feature ID: 1551411

Henning is an unincorporated community in Greenbrier County, West Virginia, United States. Henning lies 8 miles (13 km) northeast of Lewisburg.
