= Henry Schell Hagert =

District attorney for Philadelphia

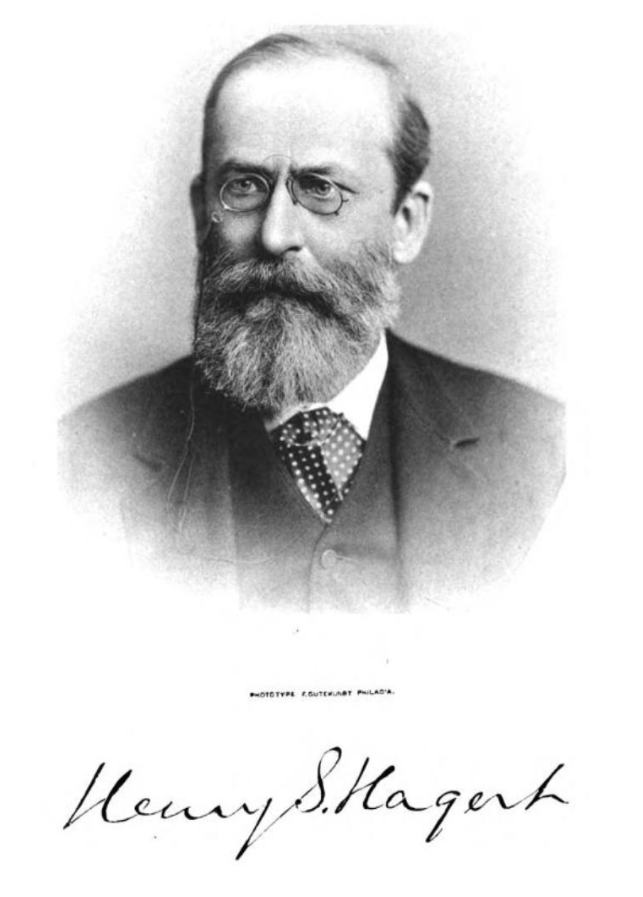
- Born: May 2, 1826; Philadelphia, Pennsylvania, U.S.
- Died: December 18, 1885 (aged 59)
- Resting place: Laurel Hill Cemetery, Philadelphia, Pennsylvania, U.S.
- Occupations: Lawyer, district attorney

Henry Schell Hagert /ˈheɪɡərt/; (May 2, 1826 – December 18, 1885) was an American lawyer who served as district attorney of Philadelphia, Pennsylvania for 12 years over four terms between 1856 and 1881.

== Biography ==
Hagert was born on May 2, 1826, in Philadelphia, Pennsylvania. He graduated from Central High School in 1842 and studied law under Charles Gilpin.

He was admitted to the bar on May 8, 1847, and worked as solicitor for the Board of Guardians of the Poor of Philadelphia. His work caught the attention of Philadelphia district attorney William Bradford Reed and after the consolidation of the city in 1854, he was appointed assistant city solicitor. He served as prosecuting attorney in the trial of Frank Kelly for the murder of Octavius Catto in which the jury acquitted Kelly.

Hagert served as district attorney in 1856–1857, 1868–1871, 1875–1878, and 1878–1881. He was especially distinguished as a nisi prius lawyer.

He was elected as a member to the American Philosophical Society in 1875.

He died of Bright's Disease in Philadelphia on December 18, 1885 and was interred in Laurel Hill Cemetery.

== Legacy ==
As a young man he contributed prose and poetry to literary journals. After his death, a volume of his poems, with a memoir by Charles Augustus Lagen, was published.

Schell Street and Hagert Street in Philadelphia were named in his honor.
