= Henning Leo =

Swedish politician (1885–1953)

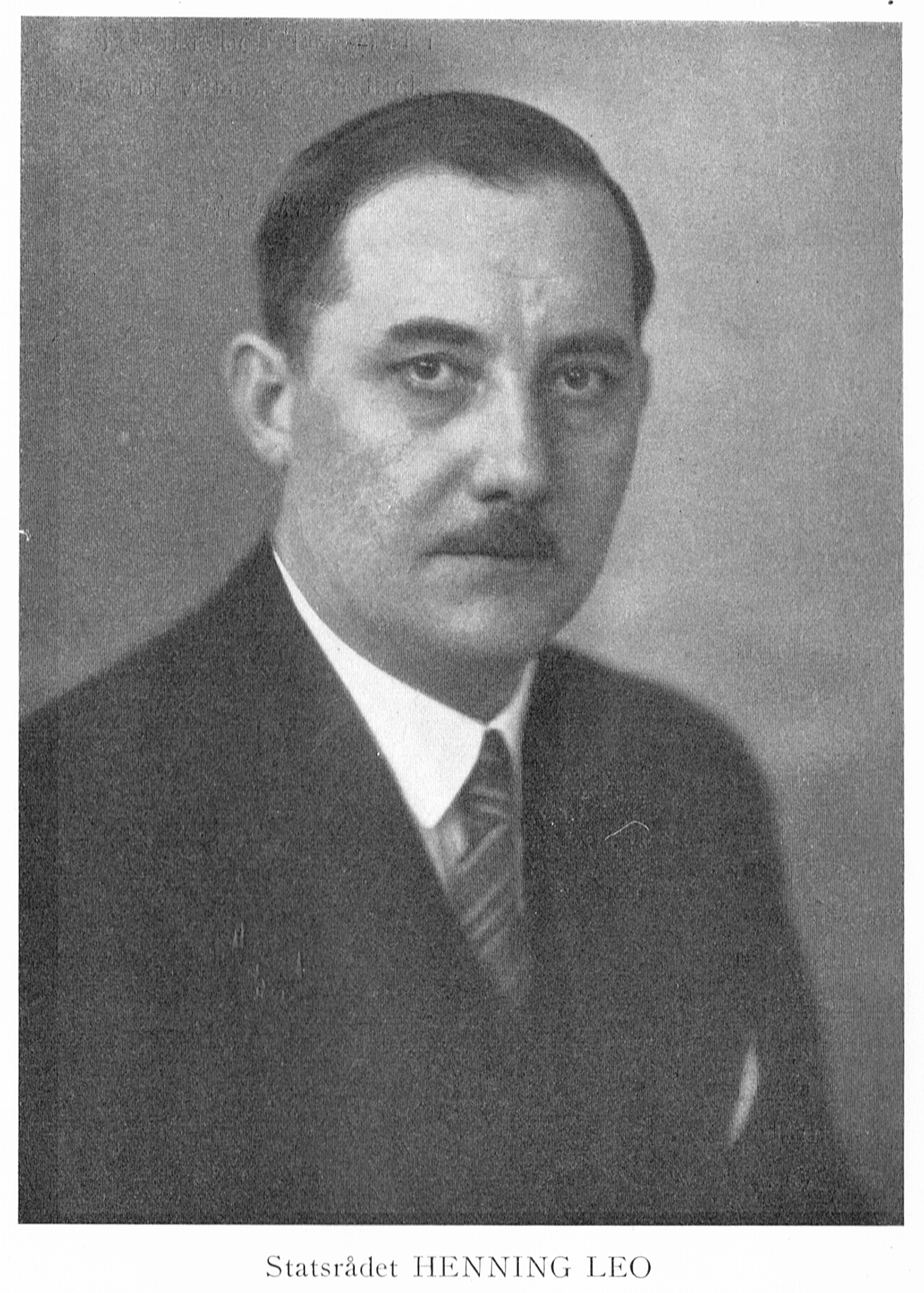

Minister of Communications (Transport)
- In office 1932–1936
- Prime Minister: Per Albin Hansson

Personal details
- Born: 3 September 1885 Landskrona, Sweden
- Died: 26 May 1953 (aged 67) Stockholm, Sweden
- Party: Social Democratic Party

Henning Leo (1885–1953) was a Swedish social democrat politician and the secretary of the Union of Railroad Engineers. He served as the minister of communications (Transport) from 1932 to 1936.

== Biography ==
Leo was born in Landskrona on 3 September 1885. In 1918 he was elected to the Riksdag representing Kronoberg County and remained as a board member of the Social Democratic Party until 1940. In 1926 he was made the secretary of its socialization committee replacing Nils Karleby in the post. Leo also served at the Riksdag in the period 1931–1932 for Stockholm County and Uppsala County and in the period 1933–1940 for Stockholm County. In 1932 he was appointed minister of communications (Transport) to the cabinet led by Prime Minister Per Albin Hansson and remained in the office until 1936. Leo died in Stockholm on 26 May 1953.
