= Américo Boavida =

Angolan physician (1923–1968)

- Born: 20 November 1923; Luanda, Angola
- Died: 25 September 1968 (aged 44)
- Occupation: Physician

Américo Alberto de Barros e Assis Boavida (20 November 1923 in Luanda – 25 September 1968), generally known as Dr. Américo Boavida, was an Angolan physician active in his country's nationalist movement.

Also known as Ngola Kimbanda ("chief healer"), he attended Liceu Salvador Correia in Luanda and then traveled to Portugal to study medicine at the University of Porto. He returned to Angola in 1955 and went into private practice specializing in Obstetrics and gynaecology until 1960, when he joined the Popular Movement for the Liberation of Angola (MPLA). Dr. Boavida became a member of the MPLA Directing Committee for external relations, based in Léopoldville, where he also led the Angolan Volunteer Corps for Assistance of Refugees (CVAAR) from 1962 to 1963. In 1963, he left the Congo after the CVAAR was banned by the Congolese government (a period that also saw a major leadership crisis within the MPLA) and worked in Rabat, Morocco, for three years. It was in Morocco that he wrote Angola: Five Centuries of Portuguese Exploitation, an important Marxist critique of colonial rule.

In June 1967, Dr. Boavida was "actively integrated in the armed struggle of the Angolan people" and practiced and taught a mixture of modern and traditional medicine among members of the People's Armed Forces for the Liberation of Angola (FAPLA) guerrilla army. He was killed in action in a Portuguese helicopter attack in 1968. A hospital in Luanda today bears his name.

Américo Boavida married Maria da Conceição Deolinda Dias Jerónimo in Lisbon on 21 August 1958. He had one son with kheira Ikhlasse met in Morocco, Mudumane Diógenes Van-Dúnem Boavida, born 13 October 1965.
