= Henning Larsen (disambiguation) =

Henning Larsen may refer to

- Henning Larsen (1925–2013), Danish architect, founder of Henning Larsen Architects
- Henning Larsen (athlete) (1910–2011), Danish marathon runner
- Henning Larsen (cyclist, born 1931), Danish Olympic cyclist
- Henning Larsen (cyclist, born 1955), Danish Olympic cyclist
- Henning Larsen (linguist), American professor at the University of Iowa
- Henning Larsen (football player, born 1944), Danish football player
- Henning Larsen (football player, born 1961), Danish football player
- Henning Sinding-Larsen (1904–1994), Norwegian journalist
- Henning Holck-Larsen (1907–2003), Danish engineer, co-founder of Larsen & Toubro
