= Dieter Henning =

German engineer

- Born: 5 June 1936; Berlin, Germany
- Died: 13 December 2007 (aged 71); Aachen, North Rhine-Westphalia, Germany
- Occupation: Engineer

Dieter Henning (born 5 June 1936 in Berlin; died 13 December 2007 in Aachen) was a German engineer and chairman of the board of management of Rheinbraun AG from 1993 to 1999.

== Biography ==
After studying mining, Henning worked as a research assistant at the Technical University of Clausthal. In 1969, he received his doctorate there as Dr.-Ing. for his work on the influence of thermal pre-treatment on the shear strength of kaolin. In 1969, he started as a production engineer at the former Rheinbraun AG in the Frechen opencast mine. From 1977 to 1990, he was operations director of the Hambach opencast mine. He then moved to the new German states, where he was chairman of the board of Lausitzer Braunkohle AG in Senftenberg from 1990 to 1993. Then he moved to the board of management of Rheinbraun AG, where he was chairman of the board from 1993 to 1999. He was also a member of the executive board of RWE AG.

== Awards ==
- 1993: Honorary doctorate Dr.-Ing. h. c. from RWTH Aachen University
- 2000: Georg Agricola memorial coin of the Society of Metallurgists and Miners
- 2000: Honorary member of the Society of Metallurgists and Miners

== Writings ==
- Untersuchungen über den Einfluß der wärmetechnischen Vorbehandlung auf die Schubfestigkeit von Kaolin. Dissertation. Clausthal University of Technology 1969
- Im Vorfeld der Eifel – Der Aufschluß des Tagebaues Hambach. In: Eifeljahrbuch. Verlag des Eifelvereins, Düren 1979, pp. 69–76
- with Klaus Müllensiefen: Herstellung von Flächen für die forstwirtschaftliche Rekultivierung, dargestellt am Beispiel der Außenkippe Sophienhöhe und des Braunkohlentagebaus Hambach. In: Braunkohle. Issue 12, 1990, pp. 11–18.
- Moderne Tagebautechnik und Rekultivierung. In: Braunkohle. Issue 12, 1991, pp. 16–19.
- Kontinuierliche Tagebautechnik im Rheinischen Braunkohlenrevier. In: Braunkohle. Issue 8, 1995, pp. 14–25.

== Literature ==
- Christoph Dieckmann: Die Zeit stand still, die Lebensuhren liefen. Geschichten aus der deutschen Murkelei. Links, Berlin 1999, ISBN 978-3-861-53057-2, p. 180ff. (limited preview in the Google book search).
