= Henrikas Ciparis =

Lithuanian painter

Henrikas Ciparis (born 31 December 1941, in Labardžiai) is a Lithuanian painter.

He graduated from high school in 1960, and was drafted into the army. He entered the Vilnius Art Institute (now Vilnius Art Academy) to study art pedagogy, and after a three-year continued his studies at the newly established high school Scenography Department. He graduated from the Lithuanian Institute of Fine Arts, in 1969. Since 1973, he has been a Lithuanian National Opera and Ballet Theater artist, and since 1983, a chief artist. In 1976–1982, he was Lithuanian head of the Art Institute of Scenography.

He held about 20 solo exhibitions in Lithuania and abroad. Creator of costumes and about 60 performances in Vilnius, Klaipeda, Erfurt, Kemerovo theaters. Since 2001, format of the Lithuanian National Opera and Ballet Theatre, summer season performances in Trakai castle (Vytautas Klova. Pilėnai, 2001, Gaetano Donicetis. Lamermur Lucia di, 2002).

He was set designer for the Lithuanian National Opera and Ballet Theater, he worked with director E. Domarku. on Verdi's La Traviata, Mozart's Abduction from the Seraglio, Gounod's Faust, and Vytautas Klova's Pilenai.

Format more than 200 anniversary events (650, Vilnius, Vilnius University, 400 First Lithuanian Book 450, Folk Songs 100 Years celebrations), concert (song festival in 1980, 1985), the Constituent Congress of Movement, 1988.

== See also ==
- List of Lithuanian painters
