= Indrek Tart =

Estonian poet (born 1946)

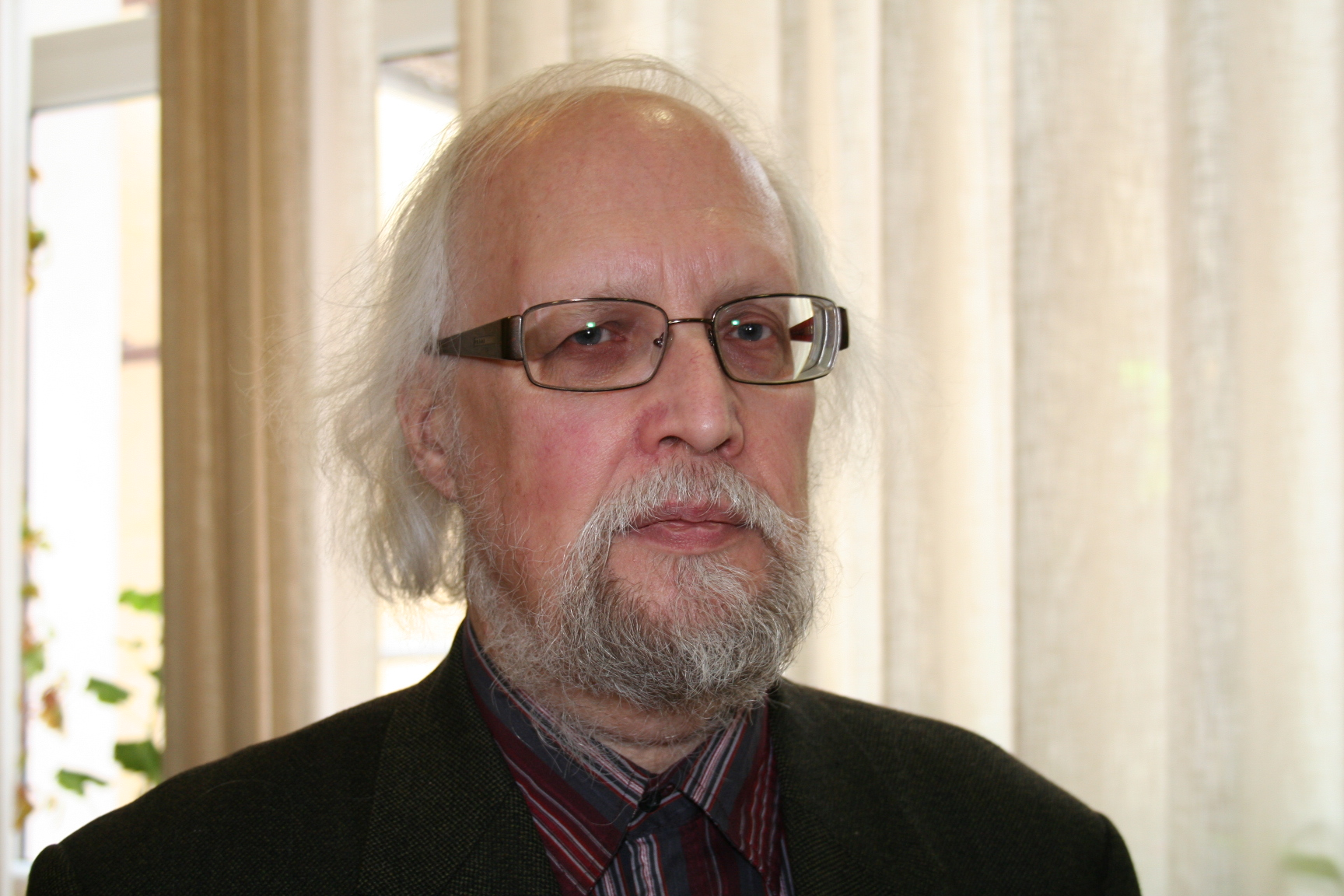
Indrek Tart in 2012

Indrek Tart (born 2 May 1946 in Tallinn) is an Estonian sociologist, essay writer, poet, and culture researcher. His wife was Aili Aarelaid-Tart.

== Education ==
Indrek Tart studied at Tallinn Secondary School No. 22 in 1953–1954, Tallinn Secondary School No. 4 in 1954–1964, and Tartu State University Faculty of Physics and Mathematics in 1964–1969, graduating as a theoretical physicist (diploma thesis: "Questions of the Theory of Interference-Polarization Filters", supervised by Professor Paul Kard ). In 1993, he defended his Master of Science degree in information sciences at the Tallinn Pedagogical Institute (dissertation "Estonian Poetry Book as a Cultural Indicator in Estonia and Foreign Estonia from 1945–1992 (Bibliometric Aspect)"), and in 2002, he defended his doctoral degree in Estonian literature at the University of Tartu (dissertation "Estonian Poetry Book 1638–2000: Bibliometric and Literary Sociological Observations").

== Work, science and creation ==
From 1969 to 1992, he worked in the so-called Lippmaa physics sector in the field of quantum chemistry, trying to develop quantum-mechanical calculations of the important " chemical shift" in nuclear magnetic resonance (NMR) . Further work in the humanities included both a citizen initiative and bibliometric models of Estonian literature. Since the early 1990s, he has focused on the theory of personal and cultural core values (in the sense of SH Schwartz's 1992 circle model) and the corresponding analysis of survey data (especially the European Social Survey (ESS) 2002–2012), focusing on higher-dimensional applications of multidimensional scaling.

As a poet, translator, (literary) critic, and essayist, he mostly uses his pen name Julius Ürt.

Indrek Tart has been a member of the Estonian Writers' Union since 1991, and the chairman of the EKL revision committee since 1995. Indrek Tart was the chairman of the EKL Tallinn Young Authors' Union (NAK) from 1978 to 1983. From 1977 to 1990 he was a member of the NLKP . He is a member of several international organizations: International Sociological Association (ISA), European Sociological Association (ESA), International Comparative Literature Association (ICLA), International Network for Social Science Network Analysis (INSNA), and he also participates in the activities of the Estonian Literary Society, the Estonian Sociological Association, the Estonian Comparative Literary Society, and the Estonian Statistical Society.

=== Chronology ===
- 1961–1964 Postman at Tallinn General Post Office
- 1969–1980 Senior Engineer, Institute of Cybernetics, Estonian Academy of Sciences
- 1980–1992 Senior Engineer, Institute of Chemical and Biological Physics, Estonian Academy of Sciences
- 1992–1995 Systems Analyst at Tallinn Pedagogical Institute
- 1995–2002 Researcher at the Contemporary Culture Research Centre, Tallinn Pedagogical University
- 2002–2005 Senior Researcher at the Contemporary Culture Research Centre, Tallinn Pedagogical University
- 2005–2015 Senior Researcher at the Contemporary Culture Research Centre, Tallinn University
- 2016–... retired

=== Works ===
- "Green Volume" (poetry collection 1981)
- "Truth" (poetry collection 2016)
- James Ragan Selected Poems (translated from English by Andres Ehin and Julius Ürt) (2005)
- "Estonian Poetry Book 1851–1995: A Bibliometric Perspective" (1997)
- "The Estonian Poetry Book 1638–2000: Bibliometric and Literary Sociological Observations" (2002)
- "Aarelaid-Tart, Aili; Tart, Indrek (2008). Revolutions as transformers of value worlds. Acta Historica Tallinnensia, 12, 103 – 119" (article)
- "Tart, Indrek (2009). Can Physics Save Social Sciences? Studies of Transition States and Societies, 1(1), 92 – 96." (article)
- "Basic Human Values in Estonia and Baltic Sea Countries" (2011) (editor and author)
- "Tart, Indrek; Sõmer, Marko; Lilleoja, Laur (2012). Basic values in Estonia during the second wave period. Aarelaid-Tart, Aili; Kannike, Anu (Eds.). The culture of the zero-income generation I: the coming of the second wave (44–70). Tartu: Tartu University Press" (article)
- "Raudsepp, Maaris; Tart, Indrek; Heinla, Eda (2013). Continuity and change of value profiles in 1985–2008. Allaste, A.-A. (Ed.). Back in the West: Changes and Continuities of Lifestyles in Transition Societies (53–74). Peter Lang Publishers House" (article)
- Paavo Haavikko. Collected Poems. (2021) (one of the translators)
