= Henry Heyl =

Henry Renno Heyl
- Born: 1842; Columbus, Ohio, U.S.
- Died: 1919 (aged 76–77); Philadelphia, Pennsylvania, U.S.
- Occupations: Inventor, chemist
- Known for: Phasmatrope (early motion picture device), first U.S. patent for a stapler
- Spouse: Mary Knauff
- Children: 4

Henry Renno Heyl (1842–1919) was an American inventor and chemist known for his contributions to early motion picture technology and office equipment. He invented the phasmatrope, an early device for projecting moving images, and received the first United States patent for a stapler. Despite his innovations, Heyl received limited recognition during his lifetime, with many of his ideas overshadowed by later commercial developments.

== Early life ==
Henry Renno Heyl was born in 1842 in Columbus, Ohio. He moved to Philadelphia, Pennsylvania, in 1863, where he pursued a career in chemistry and invention. Heyl served in the United States military and was a longtime member of the Franklin Institute in Philadelphia. He married Mary Knauff and had four children.

== Inventions ==
Heyl's inventions spanned optics, office machinery, and paper manufacturing. His work was often demonstrated publicly but rarely commercialized, leading to limited financial success.

== Phasmatrope ==
In 1870, Heyl invented the phasmatrope, an early optical device that projected sequences of photographs to create the illusion of motion. It used glass transparencies mounted on a rotating disk, synchronized with music, and was demonstrated at the Academy of Music in Philadelphia before an audience of about 1,500 people on February 5, 1870. The device showed animations like waltzing dancers and a Japanese acrobat, making it one of the earliest public exhibitions of projected moving images. Heyl did not patent the phasmatrope, and it faded from history as later inventors like Thomas Edison developed similar technologies.

== Stapler ==
In 1877, Heyl received the first United States patent for a stapler (US Patent 195,603), titled "Improvement in devices for inserting metallic staples." His device allowed users to insert and fasten staples in one step, improving on earlier designs. This invention influenced modern office staples, though Heyl did not commercialize it widely.

== Other inventions ==
Heyl also invented a wire book sewing machine, for which he received an award from the Franklin Institute in 1882. In 1913, he patented a seam clamp for making paper tubes (his final patent). He also worked on a paper milk bottle design, documented in his papers.

== Later life and legacy ==
Heyl lived most of his life in Philadelphia and continued inventing until his later years. He died in 1919 at age 76 or 77. Despite his contributions to early motion pictures and office technology, Heyl received little contemporary recognition, with his ideas often overshadowed by more prominent inventors like Thomas Edison. His phasmatrope is considered a milestone in cinema history by some historians, though it remains obscure.

His papers, spanning 1876–1917, are held at the University of Pennsylvania Libraries and include patents, drawings, and correspondence related to his inventions.
