= Henry C. Kellers =

American lieutenant commander in U.S. Navy

- Born: Henry Carsten Kellers; 1874; Charleston, South Carolina
- Died: 1954 (aged 79–80); Oakland, California

Henry Carsten Kellers (July 6, 1874 – May 23, 1954) was an American lieutenant commander in the United States Navy who served on numerous scientific expeditions on behalf of the Smithsonian Institution. During his expeditionary career, he collected biological specimens for the Smithsonian, bringing back over 10,000 specimens, living and deceased, many which were held by the National Zoo in Washington, D.C.

== Biography ==
=== Military career ===
Kellers was born in Charleston, South Carolina. After graduating from the Medical University of South Carolina, he became an orderly in 1903 after joining the United States Navy. Soon thereafter he became Assistant Surgeon, during World War I, Lieutenant in the Medical Corps in 1920, and by 1931 he was Lieutenant Commander. He was on the Retired List of Officers of the Navy in 1938, but then he was called back to active duty in 1939. He retired again in 1945. In 1954, he died of myocardial infarction at Naval Hospital Oakland in California and was subsequently buried in Golden Gate National Cemetery.

=== Expeditionary career ===
Kellers participated in a number of expeditions during his Navy career, representing the Smithsonian Institution. He participated in four United States Naval Observatory Eclipse Expeditions between the years of 1925 and 1930. These expeditions included trips to Niuafo'ou, the Philippines, Sumatra and Nicaragua. On behalf of the Smithsonian he collected biological specimens, including 130 animals and birds from Nicaragua for the National Zoological Park in 1927. He also brought back, to the United States, over 10,000 specimens from the Philippines in 1929, and over 120 boxes of specimens from Niuafo'ou in 1930. Among the 120 boxes included four boxes of samples of a plant that grew in lava, bearing wood that sank in water.

Kellers was credited for the 1930 discovery of a new genus of sea urchins endemic to Niuafo'ou, the Zenocentrotus, as well as the first two species of this genus; the Smithsonian Institution named the two species Z. kellersi (in honor of Kellers) and Z. paradoxus. The discovery was described by the Smithsonian as "one of the most important discoveries that has been made in the well-worked field of shallow water sea-urchins in the past 100 years".
