= Henriques =

Henriques may refer to:

People with the surname Henriques:

- Henriques (surname)
- Henriques family

In places:

- Henriques Street, a street in London
