= Hennings =

Hennings is a surname. Notable people with the surname include:

- Artur Hennings (1940–2003), German chess master
- Chad Hennings (born 1965), American football defensive lineman
- Emmy Hennings (1885–1948), German performer and poet
- Einar Hennings (1884–1965), Swedish diplomat
- Ernest Martin Hennings (1886–1956), American painter, member of Taos Society of Artists
- Fred Hennings (1895–1981), Austrian actor
- John Hennings (c. 1833–1898), theatrical scene painter in Australia
- Margit Hennings (born 1943), Austrian chess master
- Rouwen Hennings (born 1987), German football player
- Thomas C. Hennings Jr. (1903-1960), American politician, Congressional Representative and Senator from Missouri
- Andrew Hennings and Kate Hennings, fictional characters
- Sam Hennings, American Actor
