= Henrique =

- Pronunciation: Portuguese: [ẽˈʁikɨ]
- Gender: Male

Other names
- Related names: Henry, Henrik, Enrique, Henrietta, Henri, Heinrich

Henrique is a masculine given name related to Henry which may refer to:

== Portuguese aristocrats ==
In Portuguese: Henrique

- Henry, King of Portugal (1512–1580), also Catholic inquisitor and cardinal
- Prince Henry the Navigator (1394–1460), an important figure in the early days of the Portuguese Empire
- Henry, Count of Portugal (1066–1112)

== Arts and entertainment ==
- Henrique Campos (1909–1983), Portuguese film director
- Henrique de Curitiba (1934–2008), Brazilian composer
- Henrique Gabriel (1960–2023), Portuguese artist
- Henrique Lopes de Mendonça (1856–1931), Portuguese poet, playwright and naval officer
- Henrique Pousão (1859–1884), Portuguese painter

== Politics and the military ==
- Henrique Capriles (born 1972), Venezuelan politician
- Henrique Galvão (1895–1970), Portuguese military officer, politician and writer
- Henrique Mecabô (born 1996), Brazilian politician
- Henrique Meirelles (born 1945), Brazilian former Minister of the Economy, president of the Banco Central do Brasil
- Henrique Mitchell de Paiva Cabral Couceiro (1861–1944), Portuguese soldier, colonial governor, monarchist politician and counter-revolutionary
- Henrique do Paraíso (born 1985), Brazilian politician
- Henrique Rosa (1946–2013), interim president of Guinea-Bissau

== Football ==
- Henrique (footballer, born 1966), Henrique Arlindo Etges, Brazilian football defender
- Henrique (footballer, born 1976), Carlos Henrique Raimundo Rodrigues, Brazilian football forward
- Henrique (footballer, born 1977) (1977–2026), Leonardo Henrique Peixoto dos Santos, Brazilian football centre-back
- Henrique (footballer, born 1980), José Henrique Souto Esteves, Portuguese football forward
- Henrique (footballer, born 1982), Henrique Da Silva Gomes, Brazilian football defender
- Henrique (footballer, born 1983), Carlos Henrique dos Santos Souza, Brazilian football defender
- Henrique (footballer, born 9 May 1985), Henrique Andrade Silva, Brazilian football winger
- Henrique (footballer, born 16 May 1985), Henrique Pacheco de Lima, Brazilian football defensive midfielder
- Henrique (footballer, born May 1986), Henrique Loureiro dos Santos, Brazilian football right-back
- Henrique (footballer, born October 1986), Henrique Adriano Buss, Brazilian football centre-back
- Henrique (footballer, born January 1987), Henrique de Jesus Bernardo, Brazilian football forward
- Henrique (footballer, born May 1987), Henrique Neris de Brito, Brazilian football striker
- Henrique (footballer, born 1989), Carlos Henrique Barbosa Augusto, Brazilian footballer
- Henrique (footballer, born 1993), Henrique Roberto Rafael, Brazilian football winger
- Henrique (footballer, born 1994), Henrique Silva Milagres, Brazilian football left-back
- Henrique (footballer, born 1995), Henrique Gelain Custodio, Brazilian football left-back
- Henrique Araújo (born 2002), Portuguese football striker
- Henrique Frade (1934–2004), Brazilian football striker

== Other ==
- Henrique Dias (died 1662), Brazilian soldier
- Henrique Guimarães (born 1972), Brazilian judoka
- Henrique Henriques (1520–1600), Portuguese Jesuit priest and missionary
- Henrique Mecking (born 1952), Brazilian chess master
- Henrique Walter Pinotti (1929–2010), Brazilian physician and gastric surgeon
- Henrique da Rocha Lima (1879–1956), Brazilian physician, pathologist and infectologist
- half of Henrique & Juliano, a Brazilian sertanejo duo

== See also ==
- Henriques (disambiguation)
