= Honda WR-V =

Subcompact crossover SUV

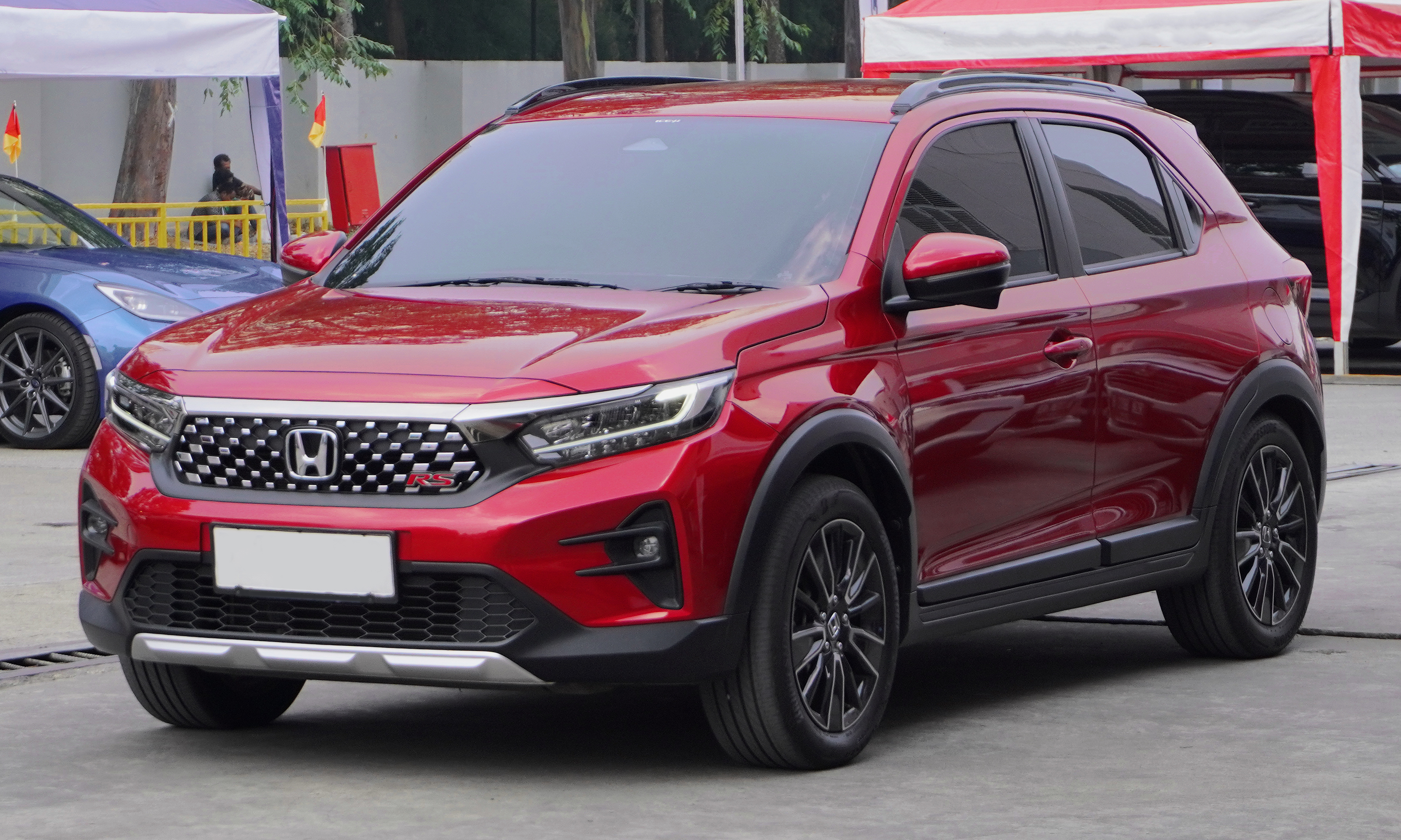
- 2022 WR-V RS (DG4, Indonesia)

Overview
- Manufacturer: Honda
- Production: 2017–present

Body and chassis
- Class: Subcompact crossover SUV
- Body style: 5-door SUV
- Layout: Front-engine, front-wheel-drive

Chronology
- Predecessor: Honda Fit Twist (Brazil)

The Honda WR-V is a subcompact crossover SUV manufactured by Honda since 2017 and mainly sold for emerging markets. It is positioned below the HR-V/Vezel or the BR-V depending on the market where it is sold. For the first generation, it was a crossover-styled derivative of the third-generation Fit/Jazz with different front fascia and bonnet treatments. Introduced at the 2016 São Paulo International Motor Show, the first-generation WR-V was built and specifically sold for the South American and Indian market. The second-generation model introduced in Indonesia in 2022 is based on the shortened second-generation BR-V's platform (also shared with the second-generation Amaze).

According to Honda, the name WR-V stands for Winsome Runabout Vehicle.

== First generation (GL; 2017) ==
First generation
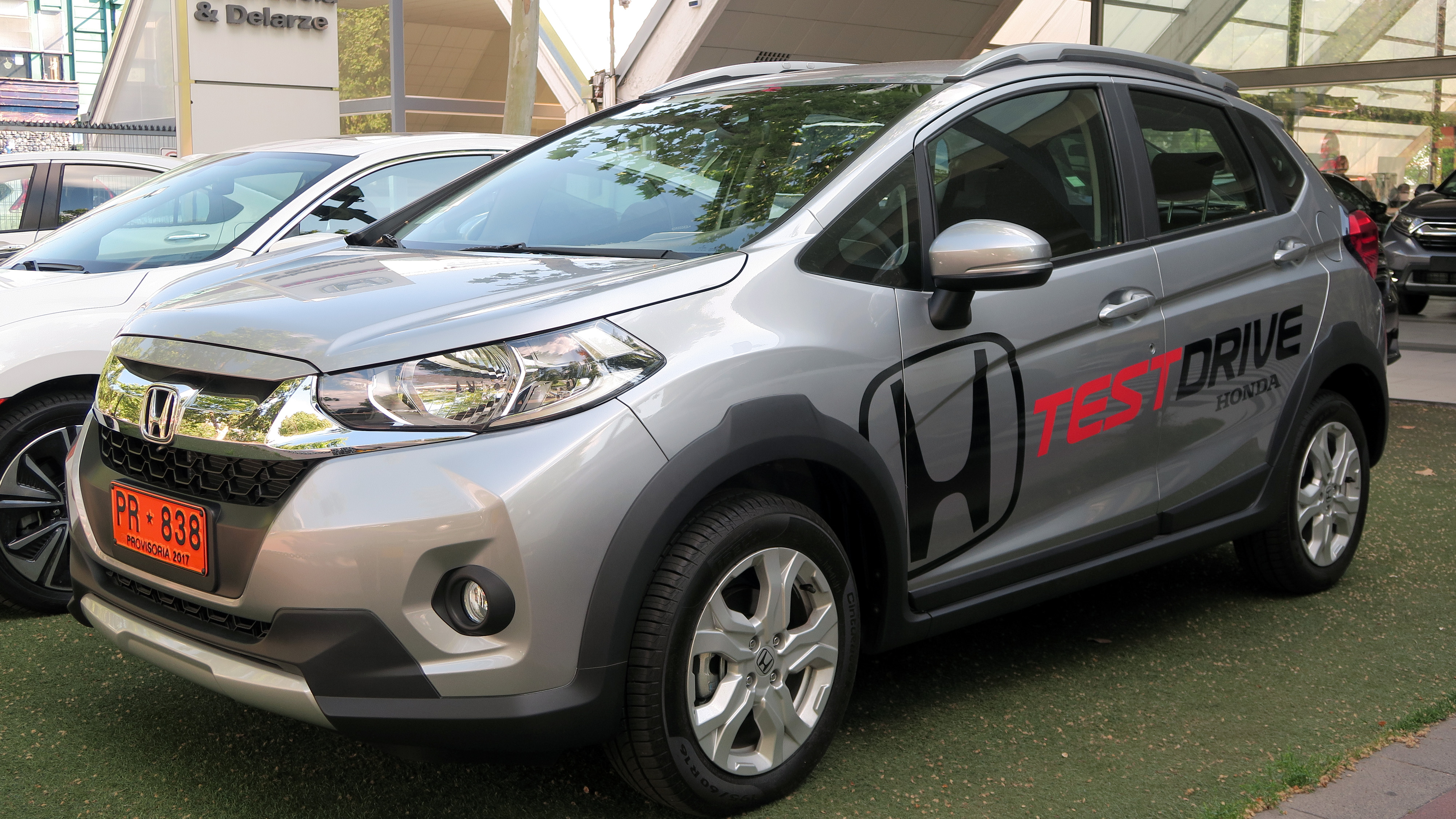
- 2018 WR-V 1.5 LX (GL; pre-facelift, Chile)

Overview
- Model code: GL
- Production: 2017–2023
- Assembly: India: Tapukara, Rajasthan (HCIL); Brazil: Sumaré (Honda Automóveis do Brasil)

Body and chassis
- Platform: Honda Global Small Car
- Related: Honda Fit/Jazz (third generation); Honda City/Ballade (sixth generation); Honda Vezel/HR-V (second generation)

Powertrain
- Engine: Petrol: 1.2 L L12B i-VTEC I4 (India); 1.5 L L15A7 i-VTEC I4 (Brazil); Diesel: 1.5 L N15A1 i-DTEC turbo I4 (GL2; India)
- Power output: 66 kW (89 hp; 90 PS) (L12B); 88 kW (118 hp; 120 PS) (L15A7); 74 kW (99 hp; 100 PS) (N15A1)
- Transmission: 5-speed manual (petrol); 6-speed manual (diesel); CVT (Brazil)

Dimensions
- Wheelbase: 2,550 mm (100.4 in)
- Length: 4,000–4,068 mm (157.5–160.2 in)
- Width: 1,695–1,740 mm (66.7–68.5 in)
- Height: 1,600 mm (63.0 in)
- Kerb weight: 1,130 kg (2,491 lb)

The first-generation WR-V was launched in Brazil on 15 March 2017 and India on 16 March. It was the first model developed by Honda Research & Development Center of Brazil in collaboration with Honda Research & Development Center of Japan, while keeping the requirements and preferences of the young Brazilian and Indian customers in mind. According to Honda, the WR-V "is endowed with a sporty, stylish and aggressive design language".

The first-generation WR-V shared many of its parts and features with the Fit/Jazz, including the body shell, doors, dashboard and the instrument panel. The ground clearance was measured at 188 mm (7.4 in).

The model received a facelift in 2020, first launched in India and then in South America.

In 2022, sales ended in Brazil. Production continued for export.

=== Powertrains ===
In India, the first-generation WR-V was available in both petrol and diesel engine options that were shared with the Jazz. The petrol unit is a 1.2-litre L12B i-VTEC four-cylinder engine that produced 66 kW (89 hp; 90 PS) and 110 N⋅m (81 lbf⋅ft) of torque, paired to a 5-speed manual transmission, while the diesel unit is a turbocharged 1.5-litre N15A1 i-DTEC four-cylinder engine that produced 74 kW (99 hp; 100 PS) and 200 N⋅m (148 lbf⋅ft) of torque, paired to a 6-speed manual transmission. In Brazil, it was powered by a larger 1.5-litre L15A7 i-VTEC four-cylinder petrol engine that was also shared with the Fit.

=== Gallery ===
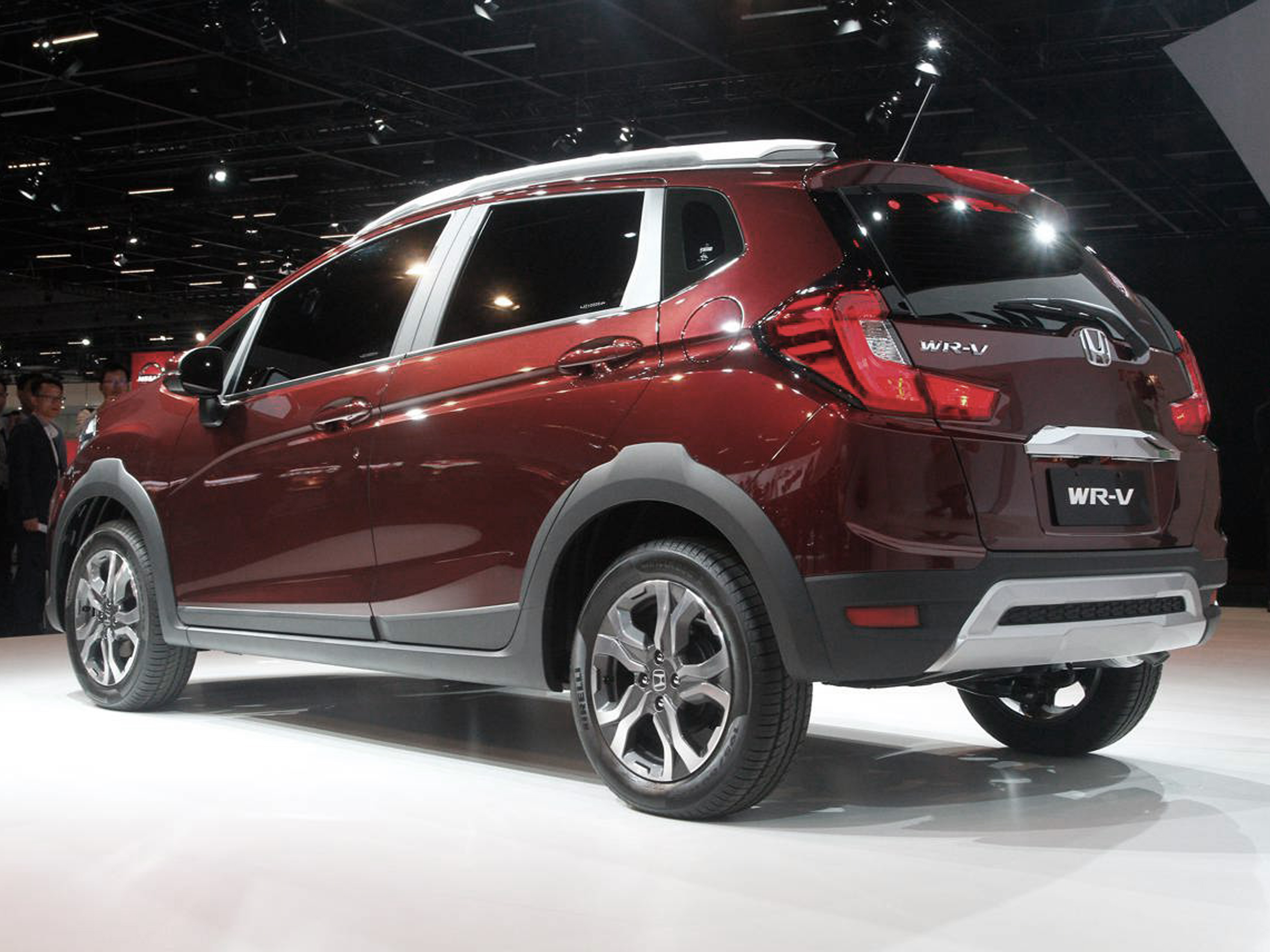
Rear view (pre-facelift)

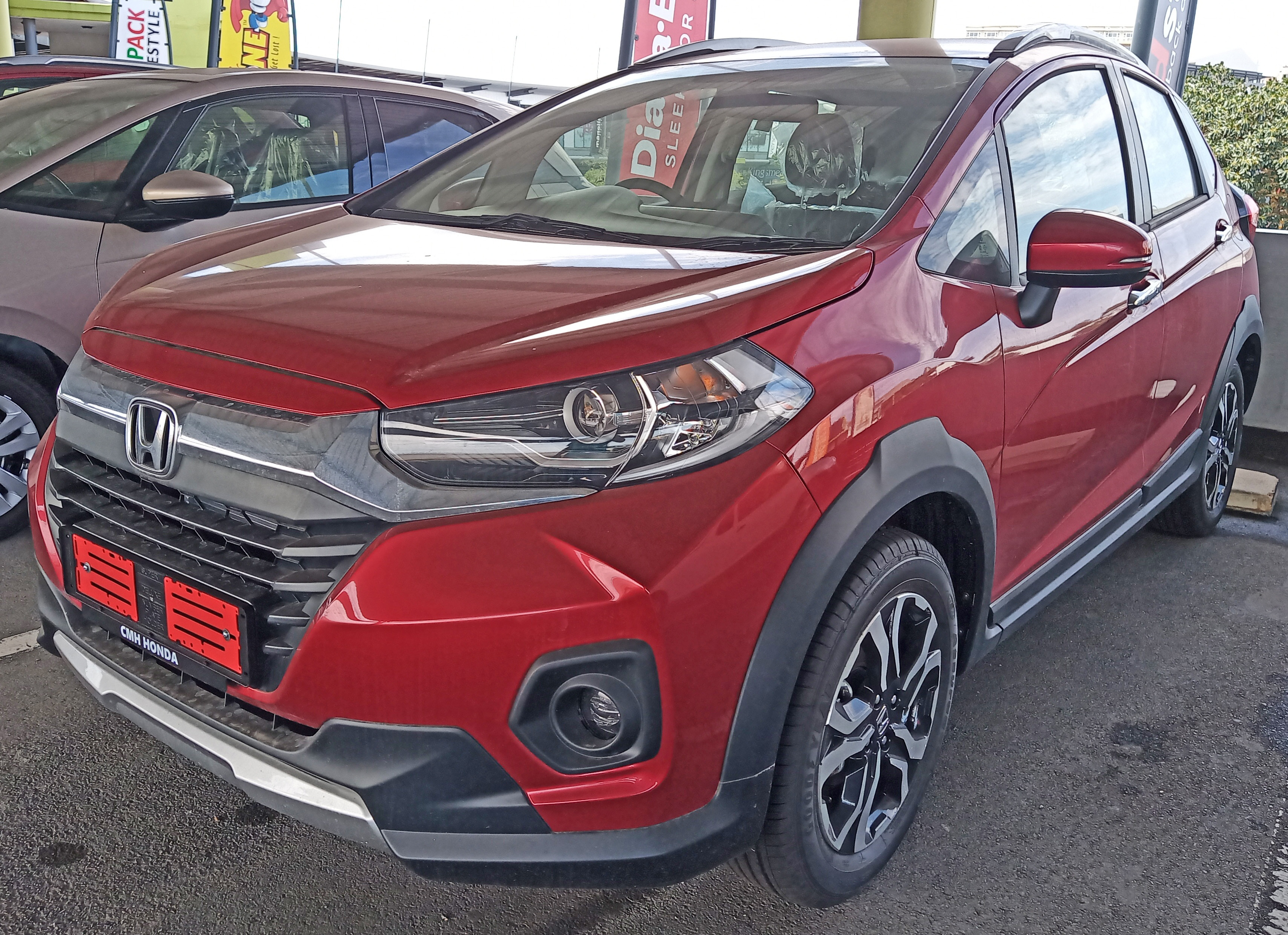
2020–2022 WR-V (facelift)

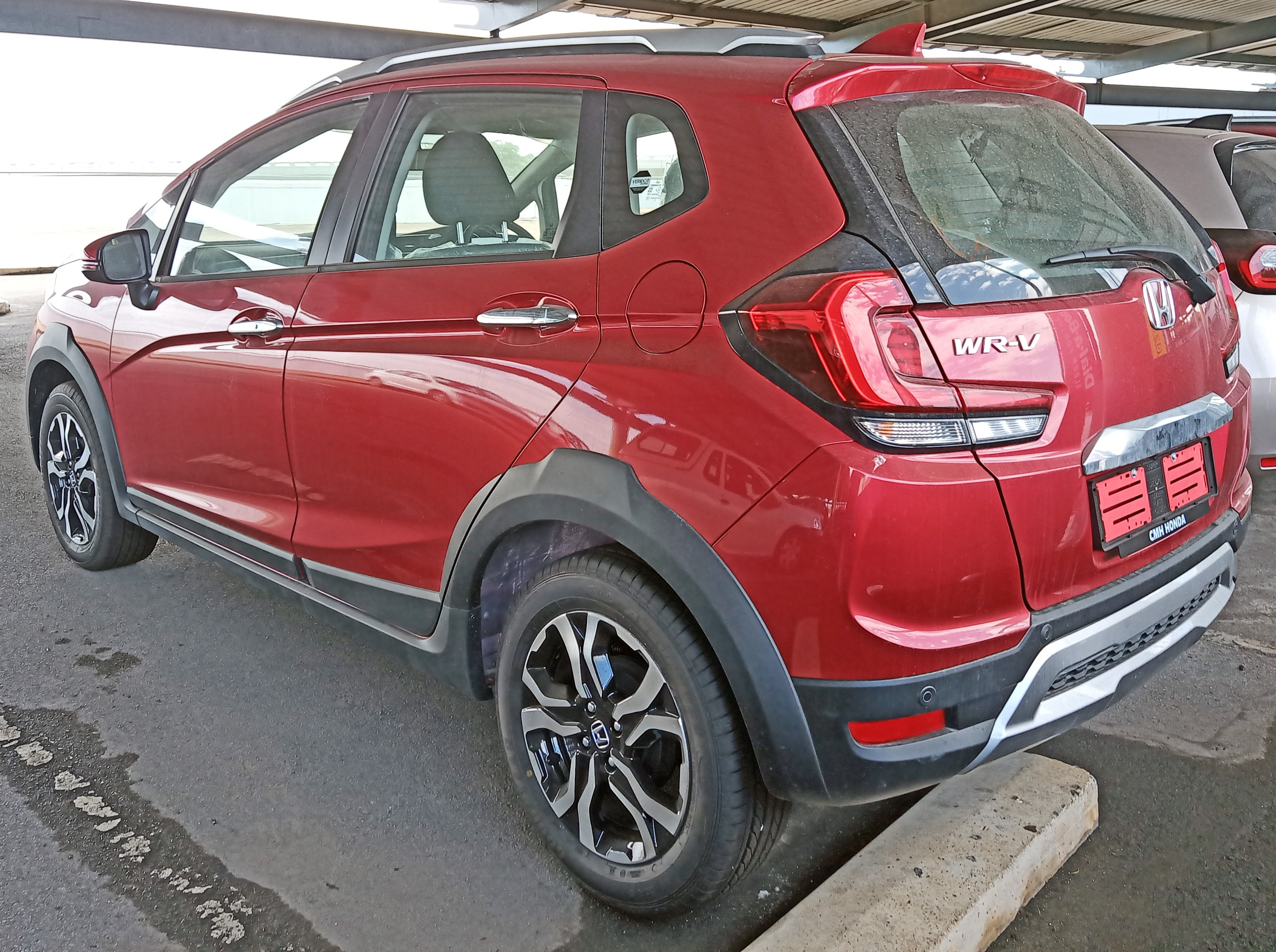
Rear view (facelift)

=== Safety ===
The first-generation WR-V in its most basic Latin American market configuration with 2 airbags, UN127 pedestrian safety standard and ESC received a 1-star safety rating from Latin NCAP 3.0 in 2022 (similar to 2014 Euro NCAP rating systems).

Latin NCAP 3.0 test results Honda WR-V + 2 Airbags (2022, similar to Euro NCAP 2014)
Test	Points	%
Overall:	1 /5 stars	
Adult occupant:	16.41	41%
Child occupant:	19.92	41%
Pedestrian:	28.23	59%
Safety assist:	21.00	49%

== Second generation (DG4; 2022) ==
Second generation
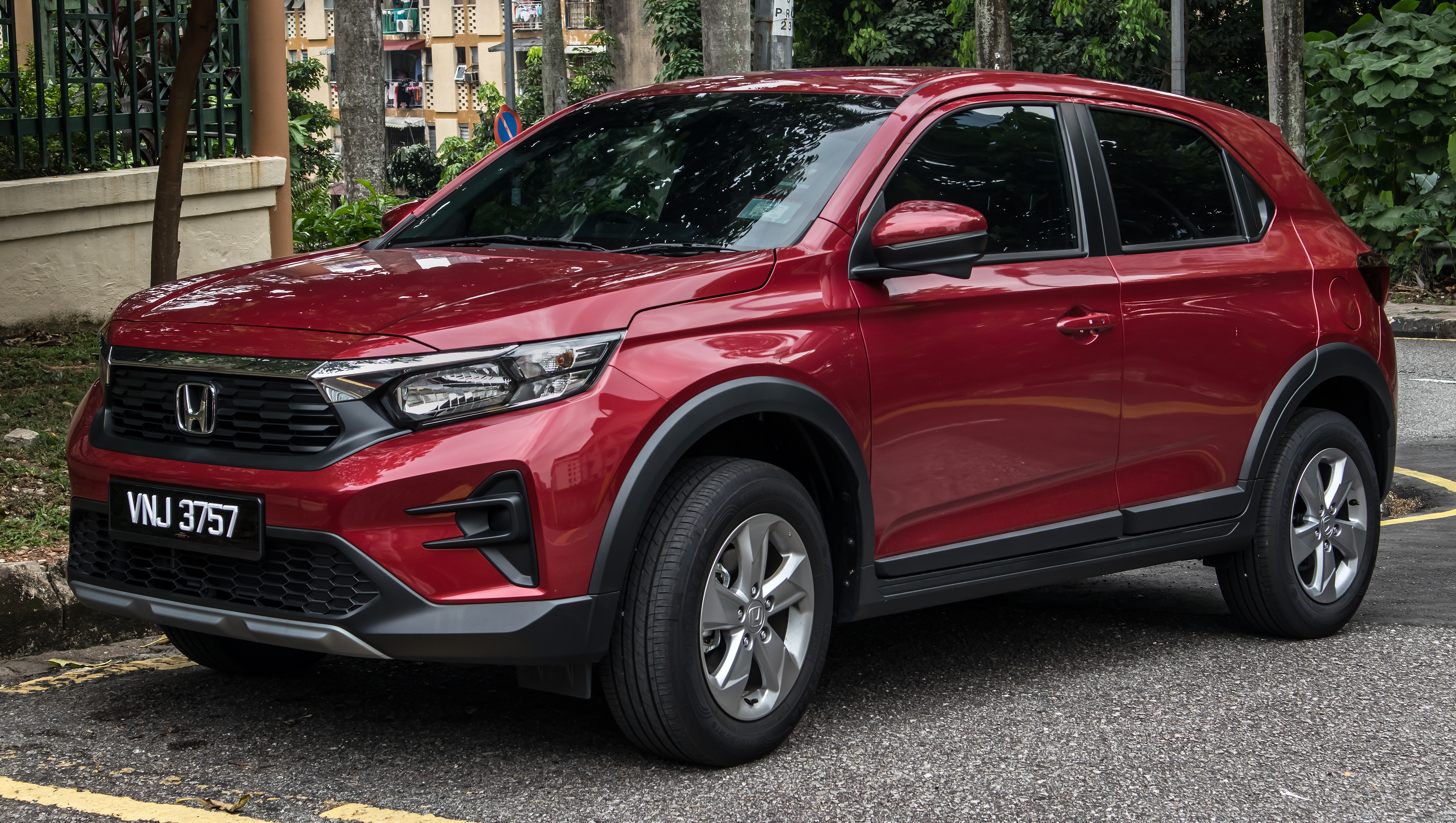
- Honda WR-V E (Malaysia)

Overview
- Model code: DG4
- Production: December 2022 – present
- Assembly: Indonesia: Karawang (HPM); Malaysia: Alor Gajah, Malacca
- Designer: Chachawal Prapai and Antonio Ryan Hidayat; Andhika Dimas Dwiputra and Kaushal Abhay Dabak (SUV RS Concept)

Body and chassis
- Related: Honda BR-V (second generation); Honda Amaze (second generation)

Powertrain
- Engine: Petrol: 1.5 L L15ZF DOHC i-VTEC I4 (DG4)
- Power output: 89 kW (121 PS)
- Transmission: 6-speed manual; CVT

Dimensions
- Wheelbase: 2,485 mm (97.8 in)
- Length: 4,060 mm (159.8 in)
- Width: 1,780 mm (70.1 in)
- Height: 1,608 mm (63.3 in)

The second-generation WR-V was launched in Indonesia on 2 November 2022. It was initially previewed by the SUV RS concept car showcased at the 28th Gaikindo Indonesia International Auto Show on 11 November 2021. Its camouflaged production form was later showcased at the 29th iteration of the show on 11 August 2022.

Development of the second-generation WR-V was done by Honda R&D Asia Pacific, led by Large Project Leader Poychat Ua-Arayaporn. The model shared the outer headlight assembly, bonnet and front door panels with the second-generation Amaze. Its dashboard is also nearly identical to the Amaze and the second-generation BR-V. The ground clearance was measured at 220 mm (8.7 in) (rated 207 mm (8.1 in) for the Malaysian market), raised by 32 mm (1.3 in) from the previous generation.

Exports from Indonesia commenced on 28 February 2023, while local assembly in Malaysia commenced in June 2023.

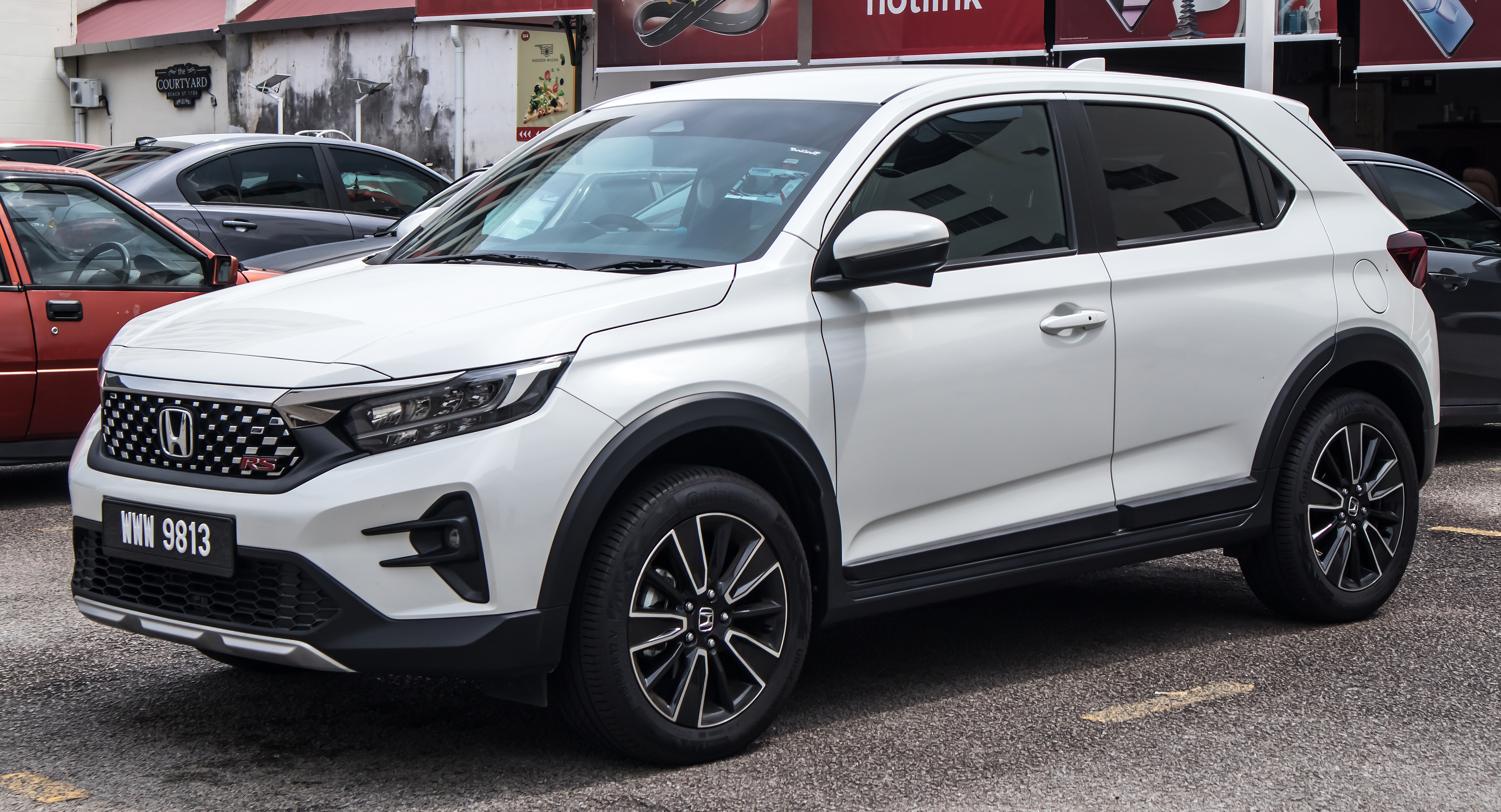
Honda WR-V RS (Malaysia)

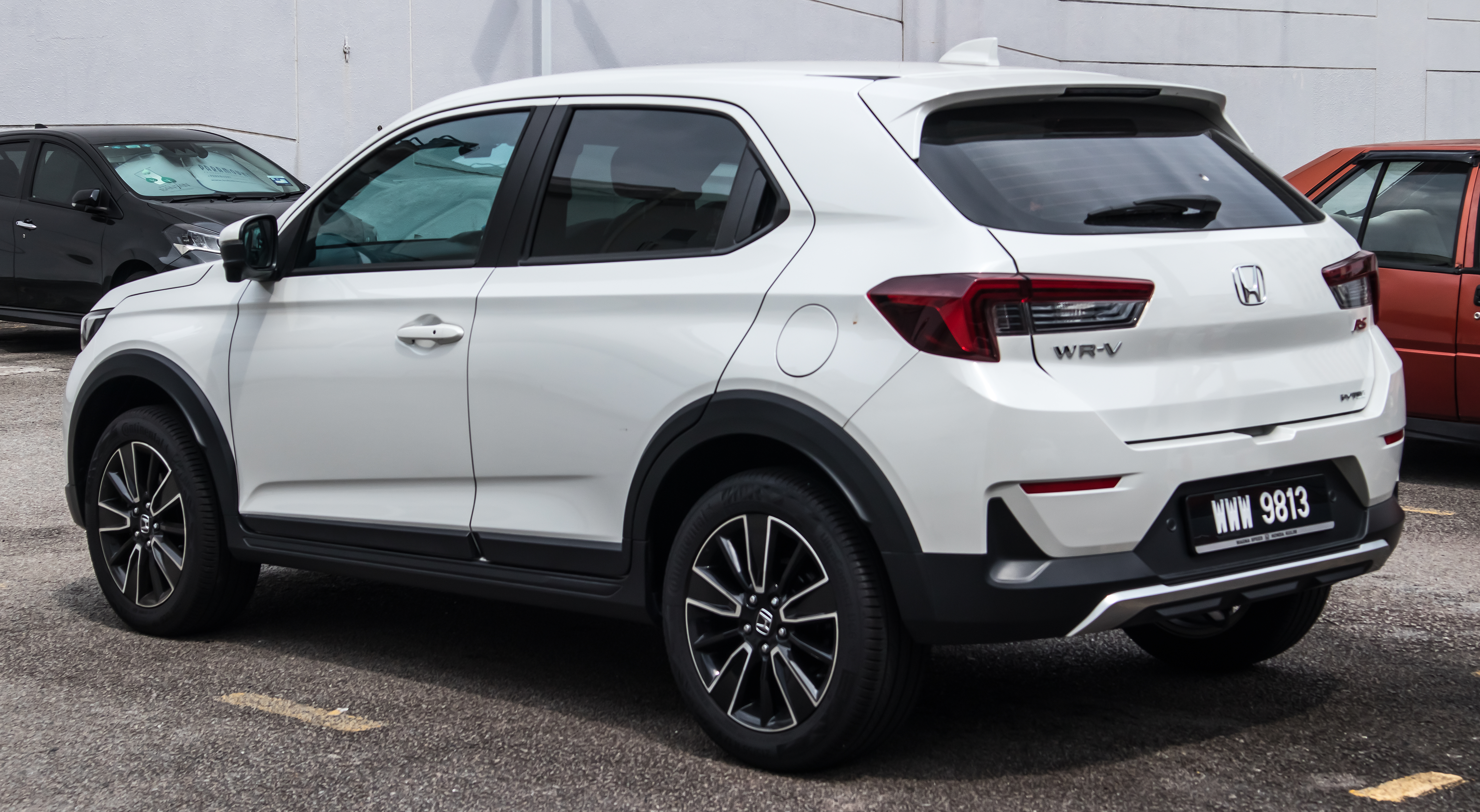
Rear view

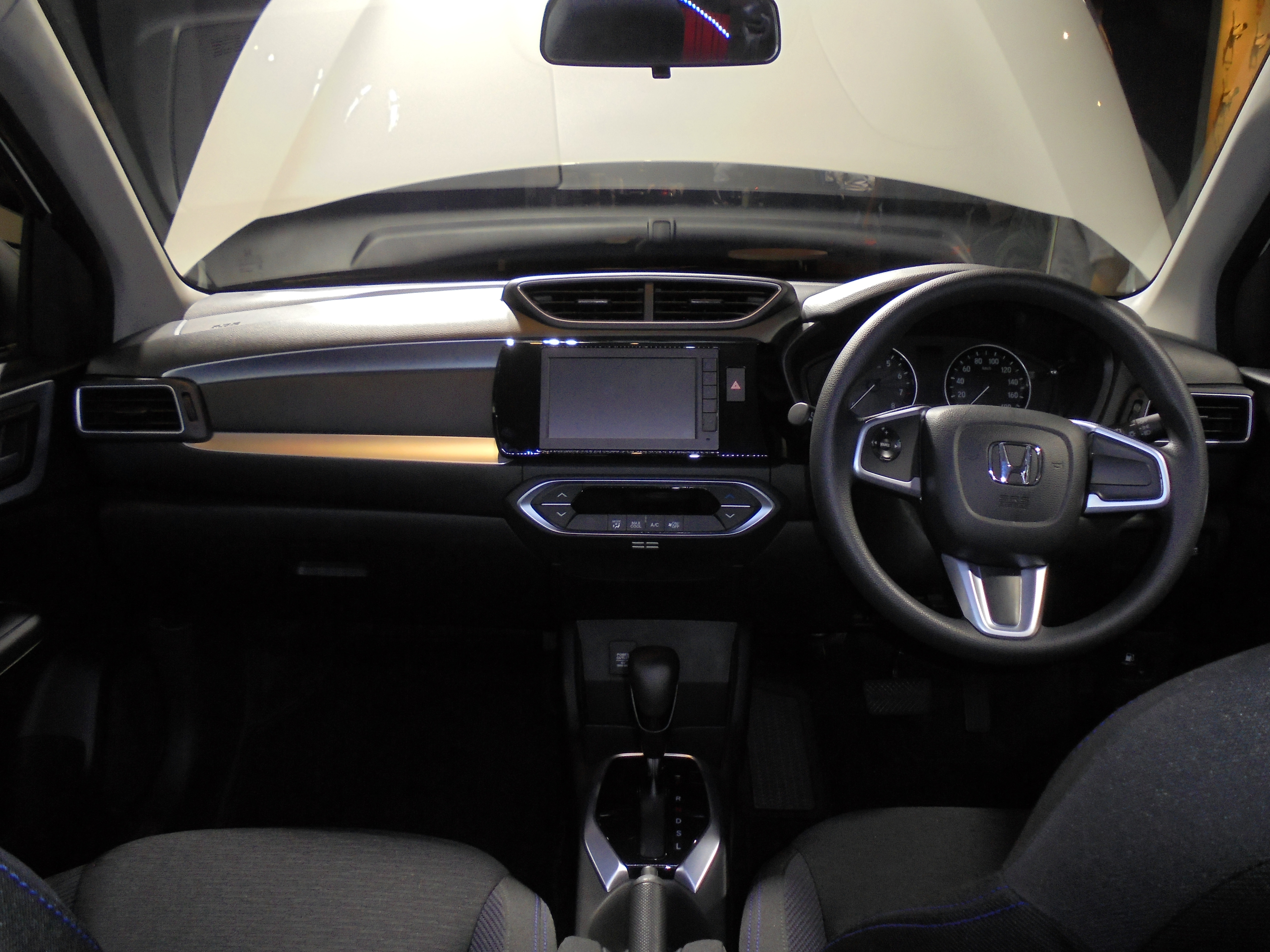
Interior

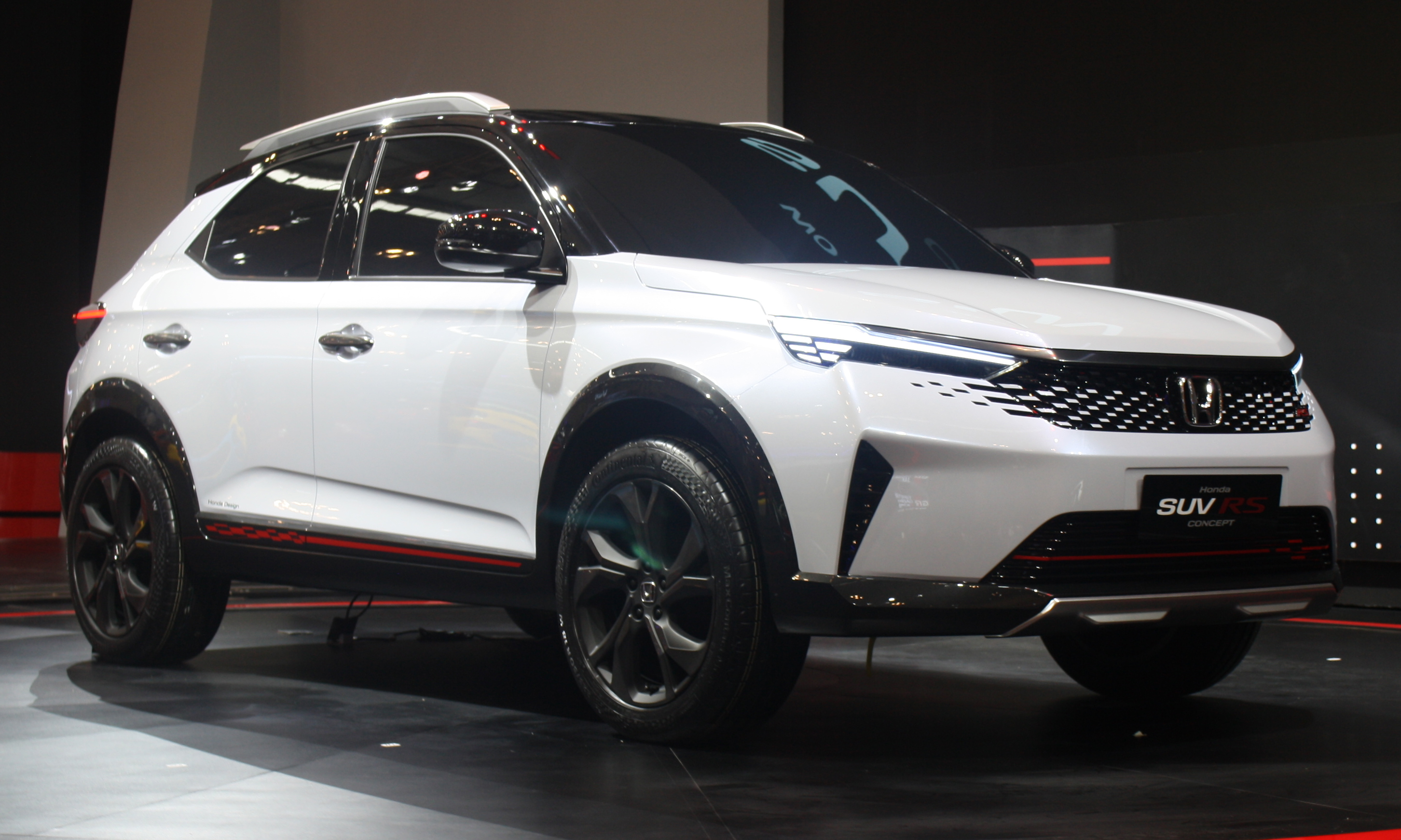
The SUV RS Concept which previewed the second-generation WR-V

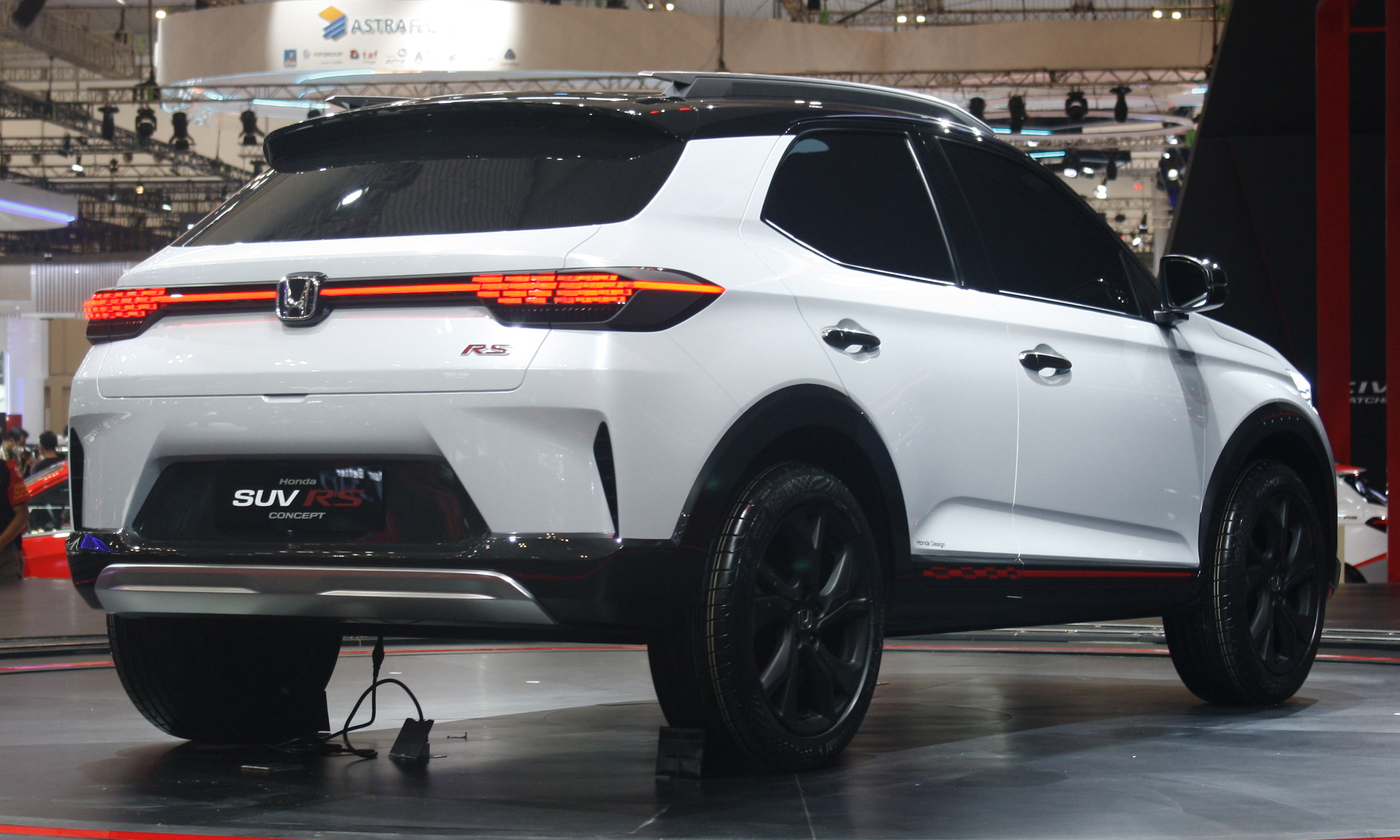
Rear view (SUV RS Concept)

=== Powertrains ===
The second-generation WR-V is powered by a 1.5-litre L15ZF DOHC i-VTEC four-cylinder petrol engine that produced 89 kW (119 hp; 121 PS) at 6,600 rpm and 145 N⋅m (107 lb⋅ft) of torque at 4,300 rpm. There is no diesel engine option for this generation.

=== Markets ===
==== Indonesia ====
Honda introduced the WR-V in the Small SUV segment on 2 November 2022, It is intended to be the primary rival to the Toyota Raize. In Indonesia, the second-generation WR-V is offered in E and RS trim levels, both initially only available with CVT. Honda Sensing active safety system along with the LaneWatch camera system is available as an option for the RS trim. The 6-speed manual transmission option was added for the E trim on 19 May 2023.

The model received an update on 5 February 2026 at the 33rd Indonesia International Motor Show.

==== Thailand ====
The second-generation WR-V was launched on 10 March 2023 in Thailand. Imported from Indonesia, it is offered in SV and RS trim levels with CVT and Honda Sensing as standard.

==== Brunei ====
The second-generation WR-V was launched on 12 May 2023 in Brunei. Imported from Indonesia, it is offered in a sole RS trim with CVT and Honda Sensing as standard.

==== Malaysia ====
The WR-V was previewed for the Malaysian market on 21 June 2023. It was officially launched on 13 July 2023 as the replacement to the BR-V in the local line-up. It is available in four trim levels: S, E, V and RS; all variants are powered with the 1.5-litre L15ZF engine paired with CVT transmission. Unlike in other markets, the Malaysian specification WR-V is equipped with height adjustment switch for the headlights in order to comply within the UNECE regulations, Honda Sensing is standard on all trim levels except the base S trim. At its launch, Honda Malaysia targeted sales of 1,300 units per month with 2 to 3-month waiting period. In September 2026, the WR-V was updated in Malaysia which saw equipment changes for exterior styling and interior, and also the S trim was discontinued.

=== Safety ===
ASEAN NCAP test results Honda WR-V (2022)
Test	Points
Overall:	5 /5 stars
Adult occupant:	34.26
Child occupant:	16.78
Safety assist:	15.58
Motorcyclist Safety:	10.45

== Japanese, Singaporean and South American market WR-V (DG5; 2024) ==
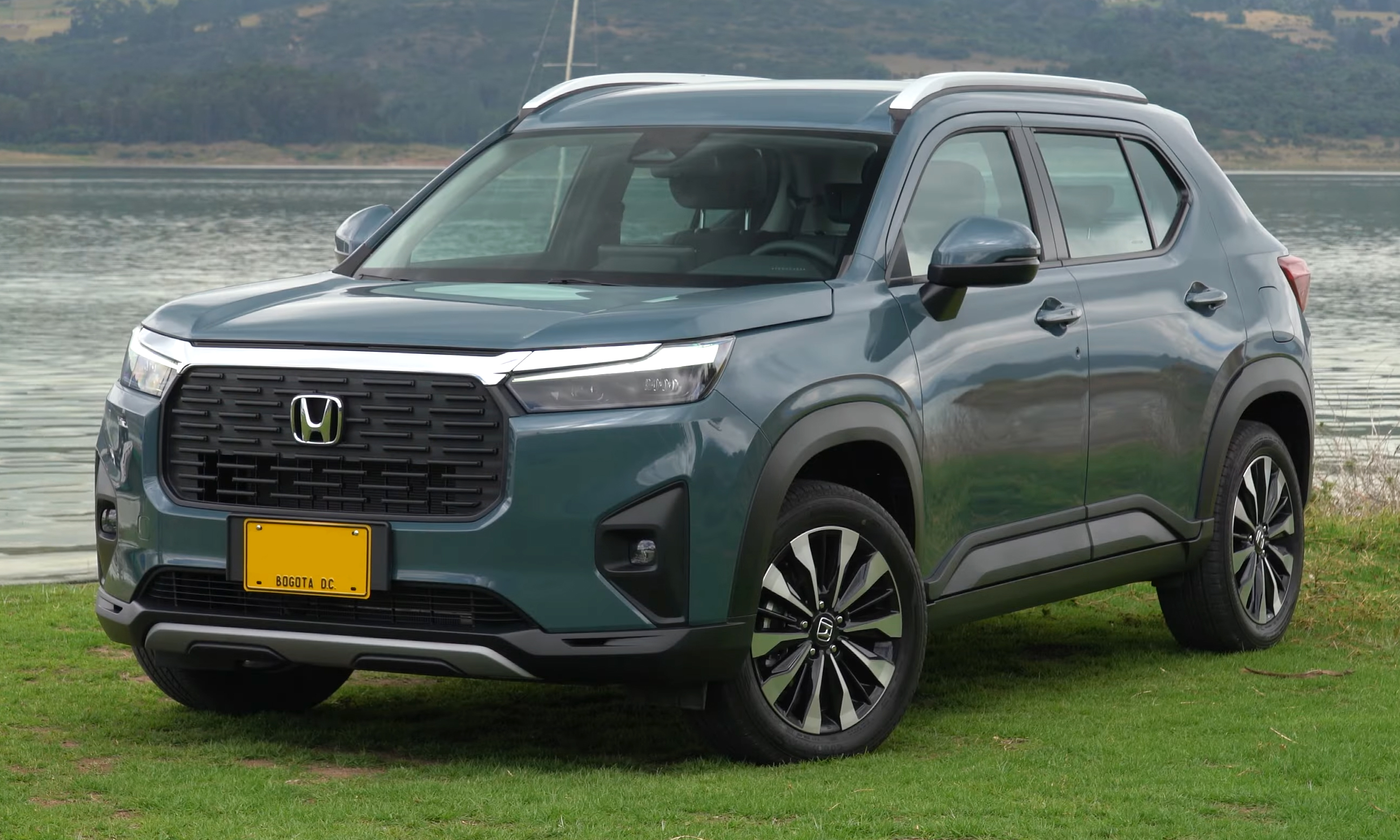
Honda WR-V (South America)

The Japanese market WR-V was introduced on 16 November 2023. Unrelated to the Southeast Asian market WR-V, the Japanese market WR-V is a renamed Elevate, an SUV first introduced in India. Positioned below the similarly sized Vezel, it went on sale in early 2024 as an imported unit from India.

The Elevate was also launched in Brazil, where it is assembled domestically, as the second-generation WR-V on 16 October 2025 after a three-year hiatus in the use of the nameplate.

== Sales ==
Year	Brazil	India	Indonesia	Malaysia (Note: Figures based on registration (Malaysia))	Thailand
2017	15,353	40,124			
2018	14,801	36,835			
2019	12,162	19,947			
2020	10,601	6,548			
2021	10,330	8,044			
2022	711		1,740		
2023	1		20,790	7,842	2,310
2024	—N/a		13,165	9,074	1,146
2025	4,589		4,421	5,616	
