= Henrique da Silva =

Henrique da Silva may refer to:

- Henrique da Silva (fighter) (born 1989), Brazilian mixed martial artist
- Henrique da Silva (footballer) (born 1972), Brazilian football defender
- Henrique Da Silva Gomes (born 1982), Brazilian footballer
- Henrique da Silva Coutinho, governor of the Brazilian state of Espírito Santo
- Henrique da Silva Horta (1920–2012), Portuguese colonial administrator and Portuguese Navy admiral
