= Movimento das Fábricas Ocupadas =

The Movimento das Fábricas Ocupadas (Movement of Occupied Factories) was a movement by workers in three factories in Brazil in 2003. Following allegations of mistreatment and exploitation by the factory owners, the workers in all three factories began an occupation of their workplaces.

Although the occupations of two of the three factories were ended by Brazilian police in 2007, the occupation in the Flaskô factory endured for another decade. Flaskô, a plastics factory in Sumaré, in the State of São Paulo, was run under the principles of workers' self-management until the late 2010s.
