= José Antônio Bacchim =

Brazilian professor and politician

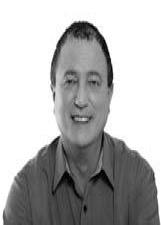
- Bacchim in 2016

Mayor of Sumaré
- In office 2005–2012
- Preceded by: Dirceu Dalben
- Succeeded by: Cristina Carrara

Deputy Mayor of Sumaré
- In office 1997–2004 Serving with Dirceu Dalben

City Councilor of Sumaré
- In office 1989–1996

Personal details
- Born: March 13, 1958 Piracicaba, São Paulo, Brazil
- Died: March 10, 2026 (aged 67) Campinas, São Paulo, Brazil
- Party: PT
- Occupation: teacher politician

José Antônio Bacchim (March 13, 1958 – March 10, 2026) was a Brazilian teacher and politician affiliated with the Workers' Party (PT). He served two terms as mayor of Sumaré, in the interior of São Paulo, in addition to having twice held the positions of city councilor and deputy mayor of the municipality.

== Biography ==
José Antônio Bacchim was born in the city of Piracicaba, in the interior of the state of São Paulo, in 1958. He was a Catholic seminarian, but he left the diaconate and became a teacher of history and geography. He became involved with movements advocating for agrarian reform in Sumaré, also in the interior of São Paulo, and began to engage politically with agrarian social movements such as the Landless Workers' Movement (MST). Through his activism in social movements, he became involved with the Workers’ Party (PT) and was one of the party’s founders in the city of Sumaré.

He began his public career in 1988, when he was elected city councilor of Sumaré, one of three PT council members elected in the city, marking the first time the party has been represented on the city council. He was re-elected in 1992 and remained in office until 1996. In 1996, he ran for deputy mayor of the city, as part of a ticket with Dirceu Dalben of the Popular Socialist Party (PPS). The ticket won by a margin of just over 300 votes over the candidacy of Carlos Hespanhol (PSDB). In 2000, the ticket was re-elected, defeating Cristina once again.

In 2004, Bacchim ran as the PT candidate against Cristina Carrara of the PSDB. Bacchim was elected in a close race, winning by a margin of just over 2,500 votes. In 2008, he was re-elected to the position, once again defeating the PSDB candidate, Cristina Carrara. In 2014, he ran for the office of State deputy of São Paulo as a candidate for the PT. Although he received more than 28,000 votes, he was not elected.

He ran in his last election in 2016, when he was a candidate for deputy mayor of Sumaré, running on a ticket with Professor Tito, also a member of the Workers’ Party. The party, which ran in the election independently, without forming a coalition with other parties, finished in fourth place

=== Death ===
Bacchim had been hospitalized since January 18, 2026, at Unimed Hospital in the city of Campinas, following surgery. Bacchim was battling cancer and passed away on March 10, 2026. His body was buried at Saudade Cemitery in Piracicaba, with officials in attendance, including Dirceu Dalben, a State deputy from São Paulo and former running mate of Bacchim, and José Dirceu, the former Chief of Staff of the Presidency.

== Electoral permance ==
| Year | Position | Party | Votes | Result | Ref. |
|---|---|---|---|---|---|
| 1988 | City Council Member of Sumaré | PT | 745 | Elected | |
| 1992 | City Council Member of Sumaré | PT | 1.054 | Elected | |
| 1996 | Deputy Mayor of Sumaré | PT | 21.766 | Elected | |
| 2000 | Deputy Mayor of Sumaré | PT | 32.981 | Elected | |
| 2004 | Mayor of Sumaré | PT | 44.977 | Elected | |
| 2008 | Mayor of Sumaré | PT | 47.757 | Elected | |
| 2014 | Deputy state of São Paulo | PT | 28.868 | Not elected | |
| 2016 | Deputy Mayor of Sumaré | PT | 14.099 | Not elected | |
