= Honda Elevate =

Subcompact crossover SUV

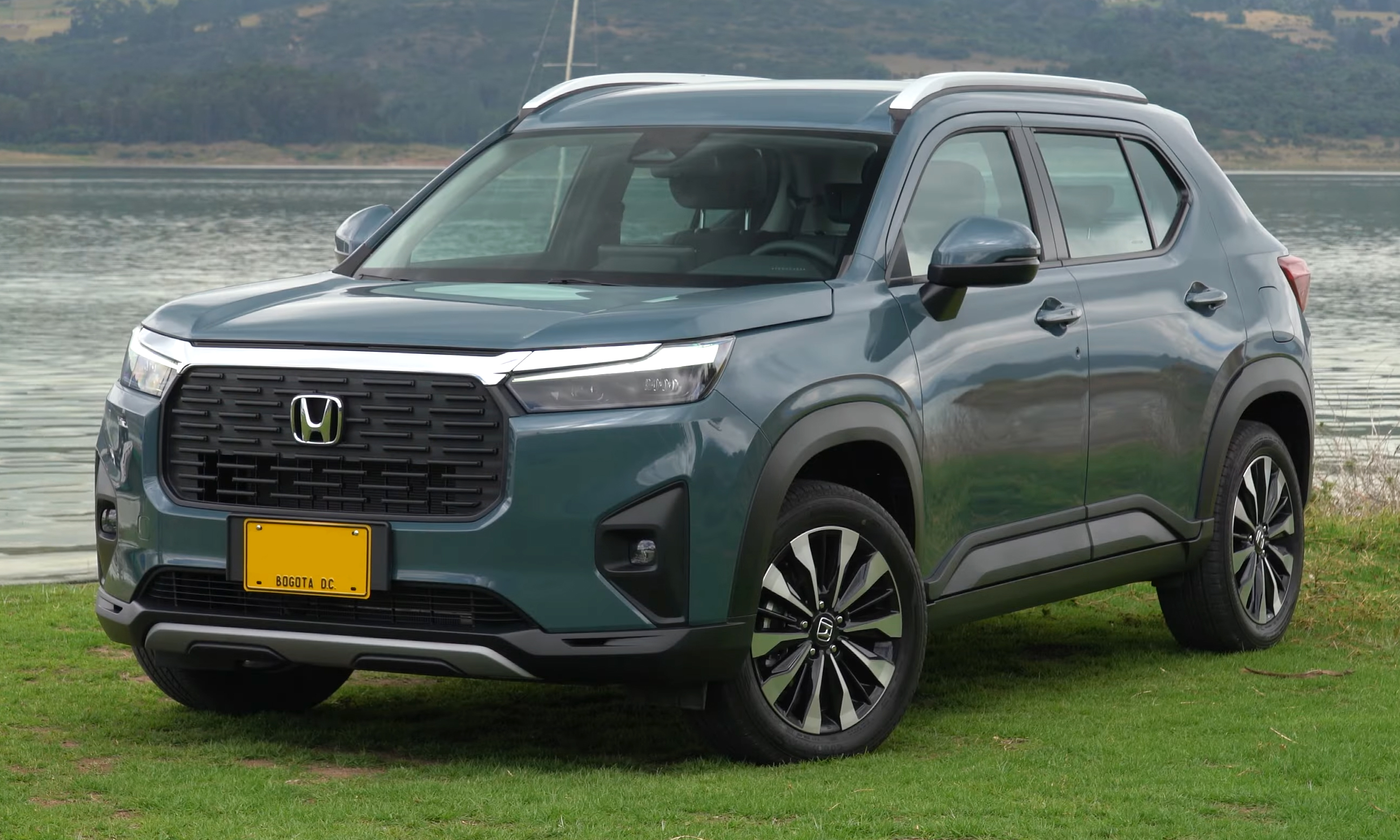
- 2026 Honda WR-V Prestige (Colombia)

Overview
- Manufacturer: Honda
- Model code: DG5
- Also called: Honda WR-V (Japan, Singapore and South America)
- Production: August 2023 – present
- Assembly: India: Tapukara, Rajasthan (HCIL); Brazil: Itirapina (2025–present)
- Designer: Chachawal Prapai, Andhika Dimas Dwiputra, Nirmay Anand, Kaushal Abhay Dabak

Body and chassis
- Class: Subcompact crossover SUV (B)
- Body style: 5-door SUV
- Layout: Front-engine, front-wheel-drive
- Platform: Global Small Car
- Related: Honda City (seventh generation); Honda Amaze (third generation)

Powertrain
- Engine: Petrol: 1.5 L L15ZD/L15D DOHC i-VTEC I4
- Power output: 89 kW (119 hp; 121 PS)
- Transmission: 6-speed manual; CVT

Dimensions
- Wheelbase: 2,650 mm (104.3 in)
- Length: 4,312 mm (169.8 in)
- Width: 1,790 mm (70.5 in)
- Height: 1,650 mm (65.0 in)

Chronology
- Predecessor: Honda WR-V (Brazil and Argentina)

The Honda Elevate (Japanese: ホンダ・エレベイト, Hepburn: Honda Erebeito) is a subcompact crossover SUV (B-segment) produced by Honda since 2023. It was introduced in June 2023 in India. It is also marketed in Japan as the Honda WR-V which went on sale in 2024.

According to Honda, the name Elevate is a backronym, which the name represents 'empowerment, liberation, exploration, versatility, aspiration, transformation and evolution'.

== Overview ==
The Elevate was unveiled in India on 6 June 2023. Developed by Honda R&D Asia Pacific in Thailand under the lead of Large Project Leader Munetsugu Kaneko, the Elevate is built on the Global Small Car platform which also underpins the seventh-generation City. Its exterior dimensions are comparable to the Fit-based, global-oriented HR-V/Vezel. It is the only Honda SUV available in India at the time of its introduction, following the discontinuation of the first-generation WR-V.

According to Honda, the boot space is rated at 458 litres (16.2 cu ft). Its ground clearance is claimed at 220 mm (8.7 in), and the turning radius is 5.2 m (17.1 ft). It is also available with optional single-pane sunroof, and Honda Sensing, a advanced driver-assistance systems package.

The Elevate is equipped with the 1.5-litre i-VTEC petrol engine shared with the City. Peak output for this engine is rated at 89 kW (119 hp; 121 PS) and 145 N⋅m (107 lb⋅ft) of torque. This engine is also designed to run on E20 fuel. Honda stated that the Elevate will be available as a battery electric vehicle "in the next three years".

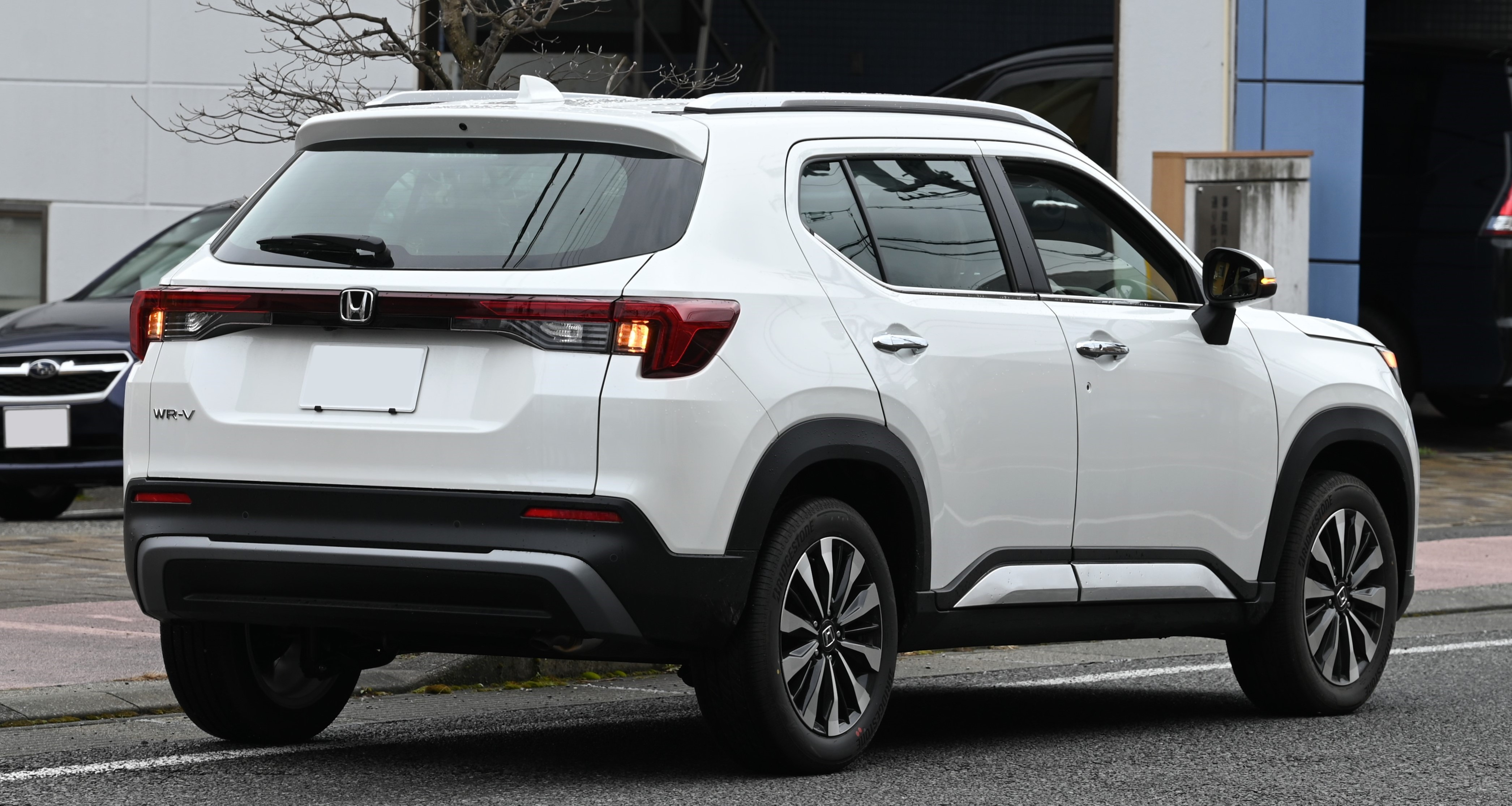
Rear view

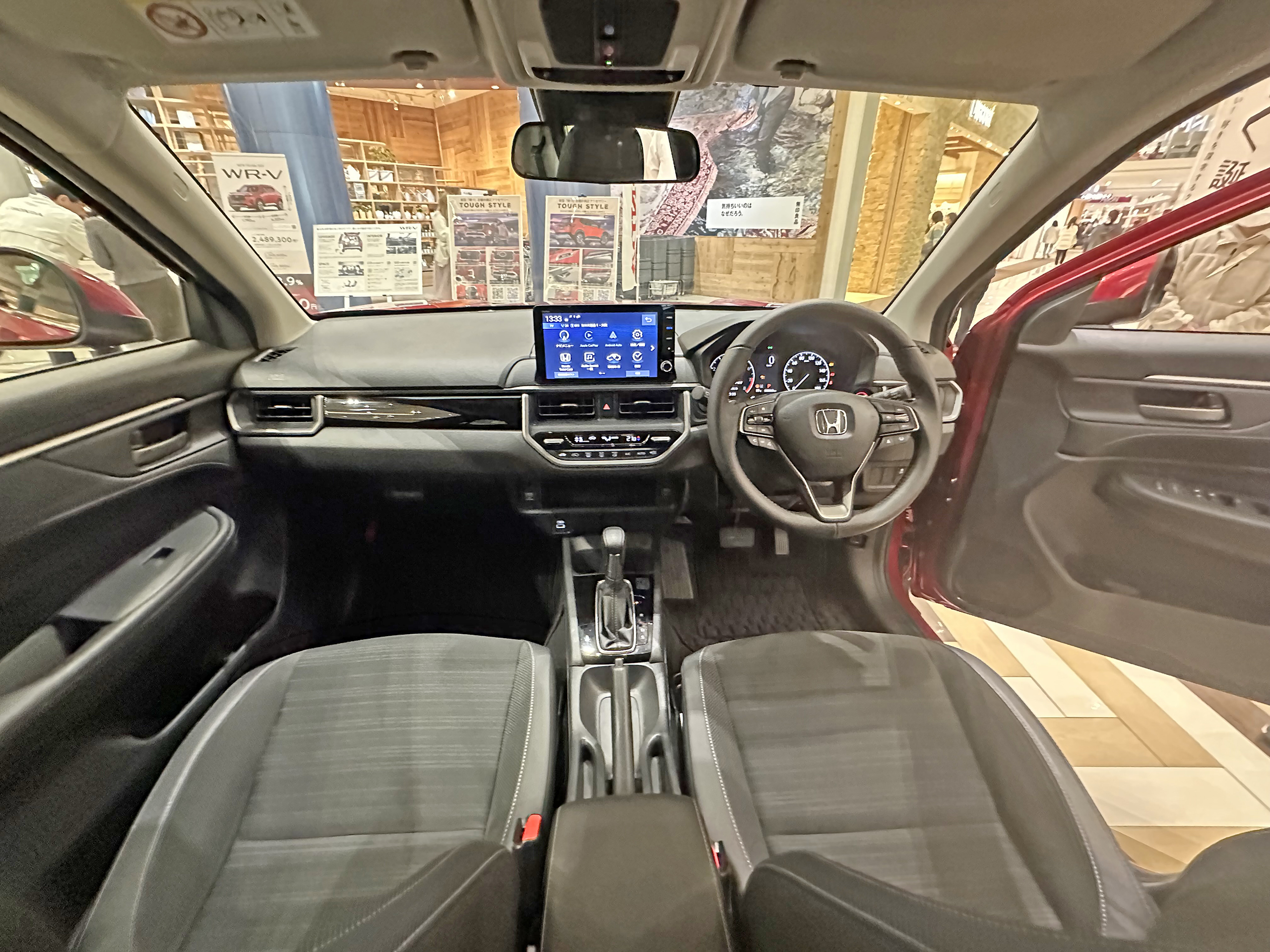
Interior

=== 2025 update ===
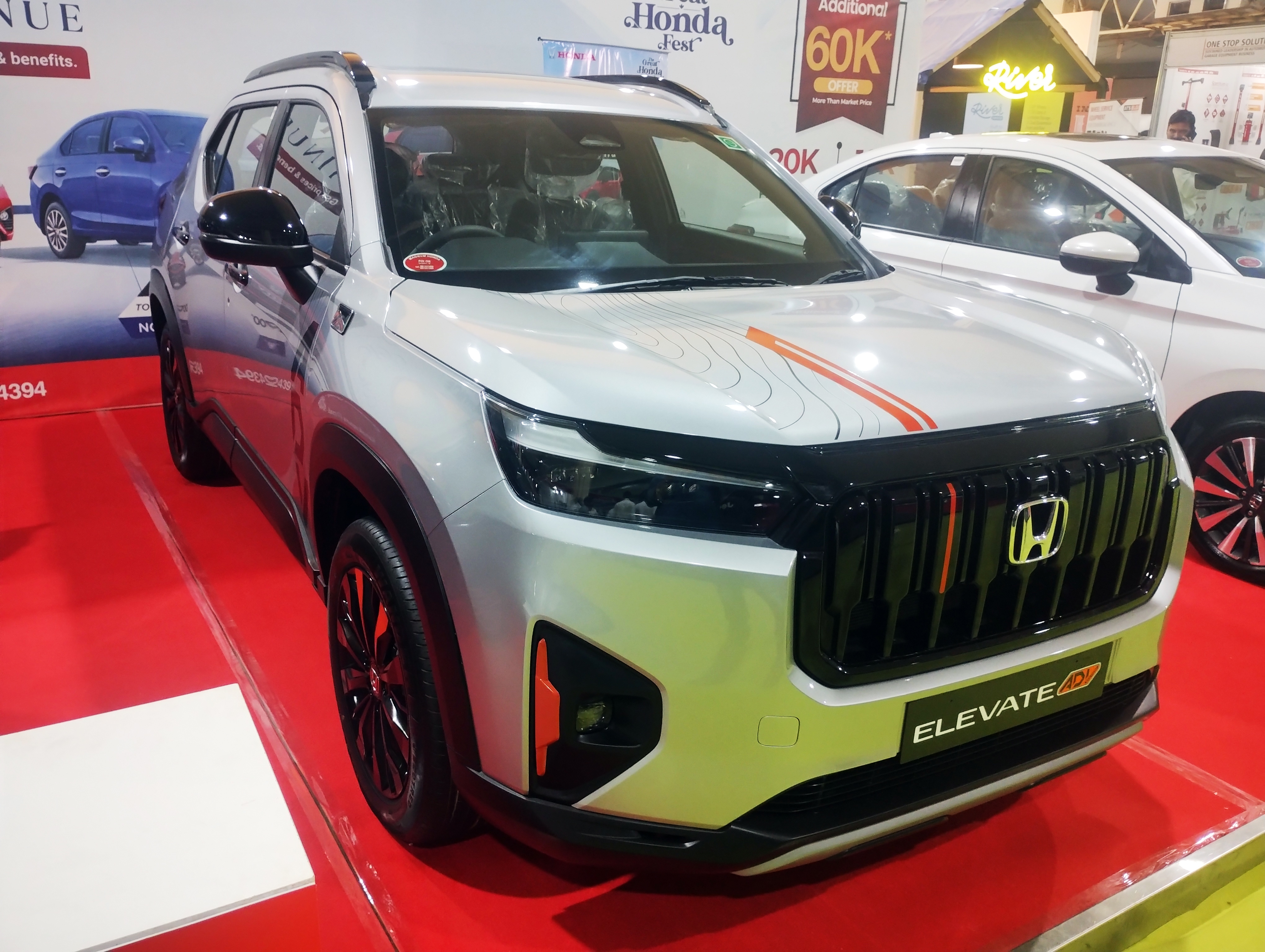
Honda Elevate ADV edition at 4th International Auto Show, Bangalore (2025)

An update was unveiled on 2 September 2025, the exterior features an 'Alpha-Bold Plus Grille' with nine vertical slats and a thick chrome surround, available as standard on the Signature Black Edition or optional on other trims. The top-spec ZX variant added an 'Ivory' interior theme with white leatherette seats and soft-touch materials, joining existing Tan and Black schemes. New features include an optional 360-degree camera and seven-color ambient lighting on ZX models, with black fabric upholstery replacing beige on V and VX trims.

=== 2026 facelift ===
The Elevate received its first major facelift in India on 6 October 2026, adding revised front-end styling with connected LED lighting, a 360-degree camera, ventilated rear seats, and a 10.25-inch infotainment system, while retaining the 1.5-litre petrol engine with manual and CVT transmission options; prices began at ₹11.80 lakh (ex-showroom).

== Markets ==
=== Argentina ===
The Honda WR-V was relaunched in Argentina on 23 January 2026. It is imported from Brazil, and is offered exclusively in EXL trim level, powered by a both powered by a 1.5-litre DI i-VTEC petrol flex-fuel engine paired with a CVT.

=== Brazil ===
The Honda WR-V was relaunched in Brazil on 16 October 2025 after a three-year hiatus. Locally assembled in Itirapina, it is offered in EX and EXL trim levels, both powered by a 1.5-litre DI i-VTEC petrol flex-fuel engine paired with a CVT.

=== Brunei ===
The Elevate was launched in Brunei on 10 July 2026 and it is offered only in a single variant (CVT).

=== Japan ===
The vehicle was introduced in Japan on 16 November 2023 as the Honda WR-V. Imported from India, the WR-V is marketed in three variants, namely X, Z, and Z+. Honda Japan targets monthly sales of 3,000 units. In April 2025, the Honda Elevate was crash tested by the Japanese NCAP and it scored a 5-star rating.

=== South Africa ===
The Elevate was launched in South Africa on 23 February 2024, it is available in two trim levels: Comfort (manual) and Elegance (CVT).

== See also ==
- List of Honda automobiles
