= Honda Cars India =

Indian subsidiary of Honda Cars

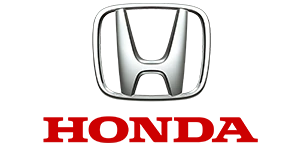
- Formerly: Honda Siel Cars India Ltd
- Type: Subsidiary
- Industry: Automotive
- Founded: 5 December 1995; 30 years ago
- Headquarters: Greater Noida, Uttar Pradesh, India
- Key people: Takuya Tsumura (President & CEO)
- Products: Automobiles
- Revenue: ▲₹17,219 crore (US$1.8 billion) (FY2025)
- Net income: ▼₹604 crore (US$63 million) (FY2025)
- Parent: Honda
- Website: www.hondacarindia.com

Honda Cars India Ltd., abbreviated as HCIL, is an automobile manufacturer in India owned by Honda. The company was established in 1995 as a joint venture called Honda Siel Cars India (HSCI). The company was renamed to HCIL in September 2012 following the sale of 3.16 percent stake owned by Usha International, making it a 100 percent subsidiary of Honda Motor Co. Ltd.

== Facilities ==
HCIL's first manufacturing plant was built in Greater Noida and began production in 1997. The initial investment into the production plant was estimated to be ₹ 4.5 billion, the plant is spread over 150 acres (0.61 km^{2}). The plants original production capacity was estimated to be able to produce 30,000 cars per year, this amount was later updated to 100,000 cars per year when with the addition of a second shift of workers, an expansion to the plant, and improvements in automation. This expansion led to an increase in the covered area in the plant from 107,000 square metres (1,150,000 sq ft) to over 130,000 m^{2} (1,400,000 sq ft).

Honda set up its second plant in India at Tapukara in Alwar district of Rajasthan, spread over 450 acres (1.8 km^{2}).

Due to the COVID-19 pandemic and a shrinking demand for automobiles Honda has cut back production and may close one of its plants.

== Models ==
=== Current models ===
Model	Indian introduction	Current model		Notes
Model	Indian introduction	Introduction	Update (facelift)	
Sedan				
Amaze	2013	2024		
City	1998	2020	2026	
SUV/crossover
Elevate	2023	2023	2026	
ZR-V	2026	2026		Imported from Japan
Alpha	2026 (planned)	2026 (planned)		

=== Discontinued models ===
Model	Released	Discontinued	Image
Accord	2001	2020	
CR-V	2003	2020	
Civic	2006	2020	
Jazz	2009	2023	
Brio	2011	2019	
Mobilio	2014	2017	
BR-V	2016	2020	
WR-V	2017	2023	

== Awards ==
Model Name	Award	Year
Honda Jazz	Car India Award – Hatchback of the Year	2016
Honda Jazz	Car India Awards – Reader's Choice Awards	2016
Honda Jazz	Zeegnition Auto Awards – Design of the Year	2016

Model Name	Award	Year
Honda Amaze	CNBC Tv18 Overdrive Awards – Sedan of the Year	2014
Honda Amaze	CNBC Tv18 Overdrive Awards – Car of the Year	2014
Honda Amaze	Bloomberg TV Autocar Awards – Salon Car of the Year	2013
Honda Amaze	NDTV Car and Bike Awards – Sub Compact Sedan of the Year	2014
Honda Amaze	Car India Awards – Entry Level Sedan of the Year Reader's Choice Award	2014
Honda Amaze	Auto Bild Golden Steering Wheel Award – Viewers' Choice Award	2014
Honda Amaze	Motor Vikatan – Car of the Year	2014
Honda Amaze	Motor Vikatan – Best Mid-Size Sedan	2014
Honda Amaze	Topgear India Awards – Value Car of the Year	2014
Honda Amaze	Kenwood God's Own Car & Bike Awards (Topgear Malayalam)	2014
Honda Amaze	AutoPortal 'Best Upgrade'	2014

Model Name	Award	Year
Honda City	Autoportal – Sedan of the Year	2021
Honda City	Autox – Best Cars of 2021	2021
Honda City	Bloomberg TV Autocar Awards – Salon Car of the Year	2021
Honda City	Car India – Sedan of the Year	2021
Honda City	Car and Bike Awards – Compact Sedan of the Year	2021
Honda City	Car and Bike Awards – the Viewer's Choice Car of the Year	2021
Honda City	Motor Scribes – Sedan of the Year	2020
Honda City	Motor Vikatan – Mid Size Sedan of the Year	2020
Honda City	Quarter Mile – Sedan of the Year	2021
Honda City	High Tech Awards – Sedan of the Year	2020
Honda City	The Highest Ranked 'Midsize Car' – JD Power Asia Pacific 2012 India Initial Quality Study (IQS)	2012
Honda City	Autobild & Carwale Golden Steering Awards – Consumer Favourite Owner Driven Car	2010
Honda City	JD Power Asia Pacific 2010 India IQS – Best Car in Midsize Segment	2010
Honda City	JD Power Asia Pacific 2009 India IQS – Honda City No.1	2009
Honda City	Indian Car of the Year 2009 (Icoty 2009) – New Honda City	2009
Honda City	Carwale.com Awards – India's Favourite Car for Self-driven Executives	2009
Honda City	Carwale.com Awards -the Coveted 'new Car of the Year	2009
Honda City	NDTV Profit – Car India & Bike India Awards – Car of the Year	2009
Honda City	NDTV Profit – Car India & Bike India Awards – Mid-Size Car of the Year	2009
Honda City	NDTV Profit – Car India & Bike India Awards – Viewer's Choice Car of the Year	2009
Honda City	CNBC TV – 18 Overdrive Awards – Viewers' Choice Car of the Year	2009
Honda City	BS Motoring Award – Car of the Year	2009
Honda City	UTVI Autocar Awards – Viewers' Choice Car of the Year	2009
Honda City	UTVI Autocar Awards – Best Design Award	2009
Honda City	Zigwheels Awards – Car of the Year – Honda City	2008
Honda City	Zigwheels Awards – Sedan of the Year – Honda City	2008

== See also ==
- Hero MotoCorp
- Honda Motorcycle and Scooter India
- Automotive industry in India
