= Honda Amaze =

Subcompact sedan produced by Honda

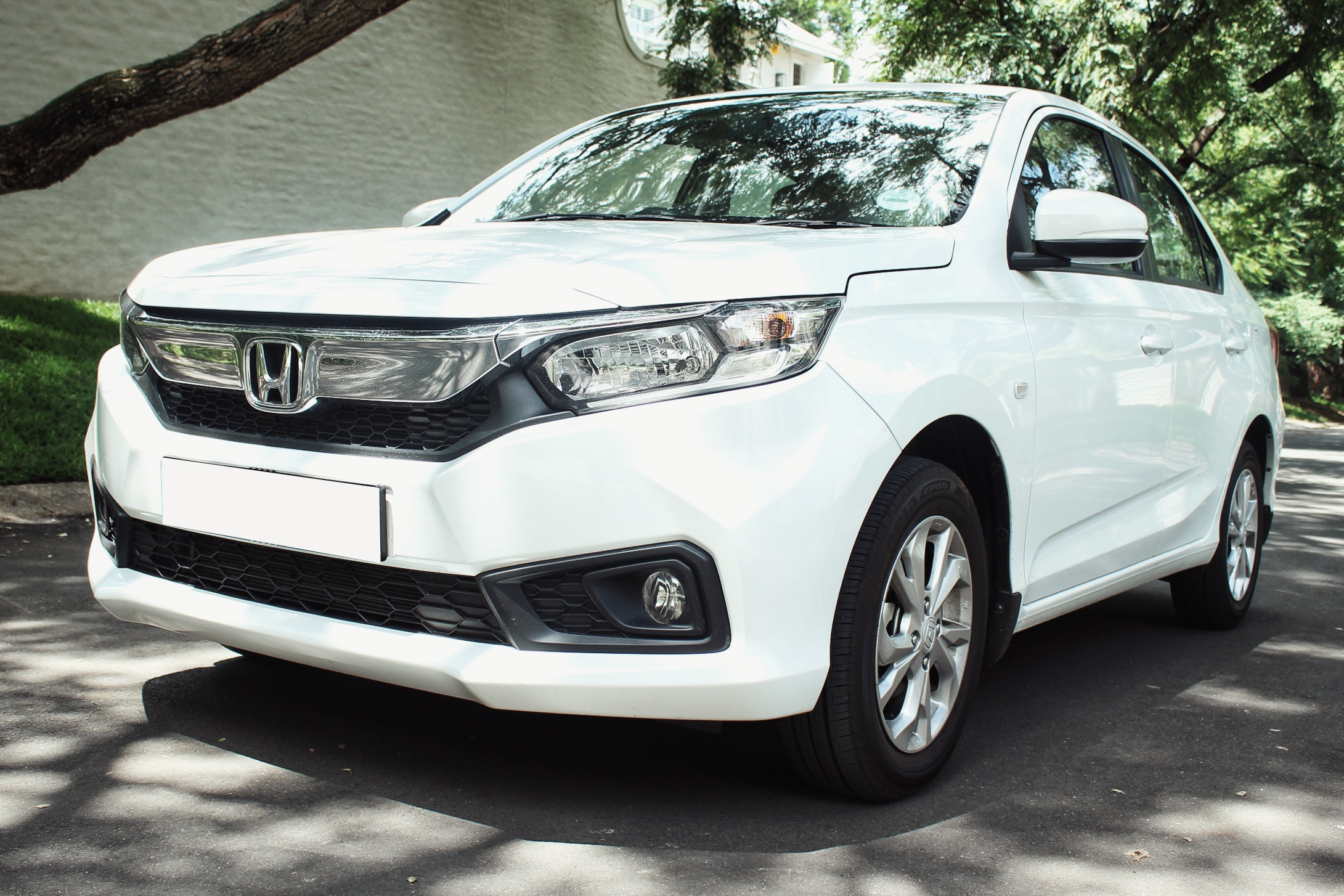
- Second generation Amaze

Overview
- Manufacturer: Honda
- Also called: Honda Brio Amaze (2013–2018)
- Production: 2013–present

Body and chassis
- Class: Subcompact car
- Body style: 4-door sedan
- Layout: Front-engine, front-wheel-drive

The Honda Amaze (also known as Honda Brio Amaze for the first generation) is a sedan produced by Honda since 2013. Slotted below the City sedan, it is the smallest Honda sedan model as of 2022, with all generations measured less than 4 m (157.5 in) in length. It is mainly marketed in India, where sub-4-metre cars are given a lower excise duty compared to longer vehicles.

For the first generation, it was offered as the sedan counterpart to the Brio hatchback and shared most of its design and architecture with it, while the second-generation model is built on the separate platform from the Brio (derived from the sixth-generation City instead).

== First generation (DF1/2; 2013) ==
First generation
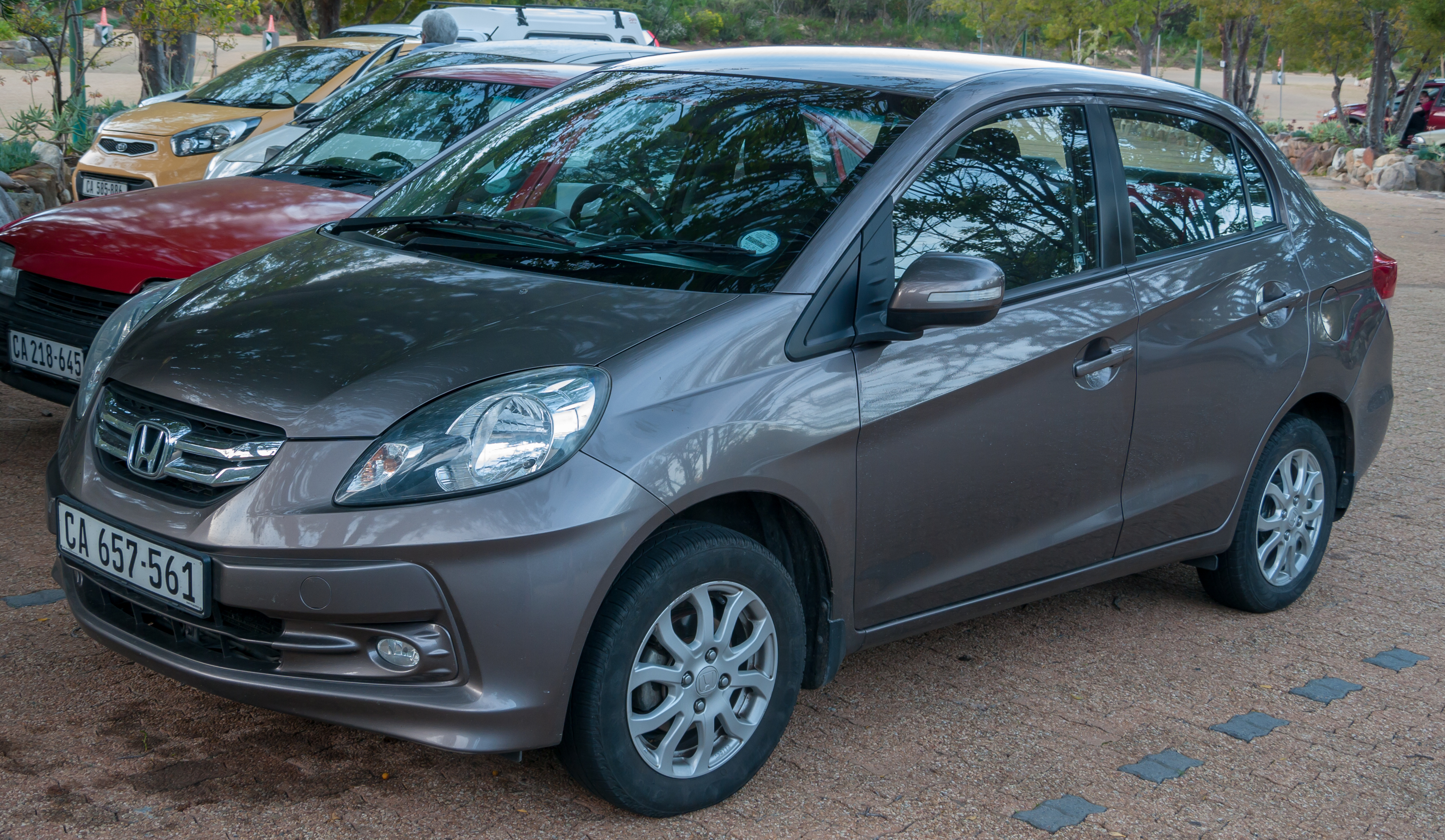
- Honda Brio Amaze (pre-facelift, South Africa)

Overview
- Model code: DF1; DF2
- Also called: Honda Brio Amaze
- Production: 2013–2018 (India); 2013–2020 (Thailand)
- Assembly: India: Greater Noida; Tapukara, Rajasthan (Honda Cars India); Thailand: Ayutthaya
- Designer: Akihiko Ohhashi and Keisuke Asai

Body and chassis
- Platform: Honda Global Small Car
- Related: Honda Brio; Honda Mobilio (second generation); Honda BR-V (first generation)

Powertrain
- Engine: Petrol: 1.2 L L12B3 i-VTEC I4; 1.3 L L13Z1 i-VTEC I4 (Southeast Asia); Diesel: 1.5 L N15A1 i-DTEC turbo I4 (DF2, India)
- Power output: 66 kW (89 hp; 90 PS) (1.2 L petrol); 73.5 kW (99 hp; 100 PS) (1.3 L petrol); 59–73.5 kW (79–99 hp; 80–100 PS) (1.5 L diesel)
- Transmission: 5-speed manual; 5-speed automatic; CVT

Dimensions
- Wheelbase: 2,405 mm (94.7 in)
- Length: 3,990 mm (157.1 in)
- Width: 1,680 mm (66.1 in)
- Height: 1,505 mm (59.3 in)
- Kerb weight: 1,060 kg (2,337 lb)

=== Markets ===
==== India ====
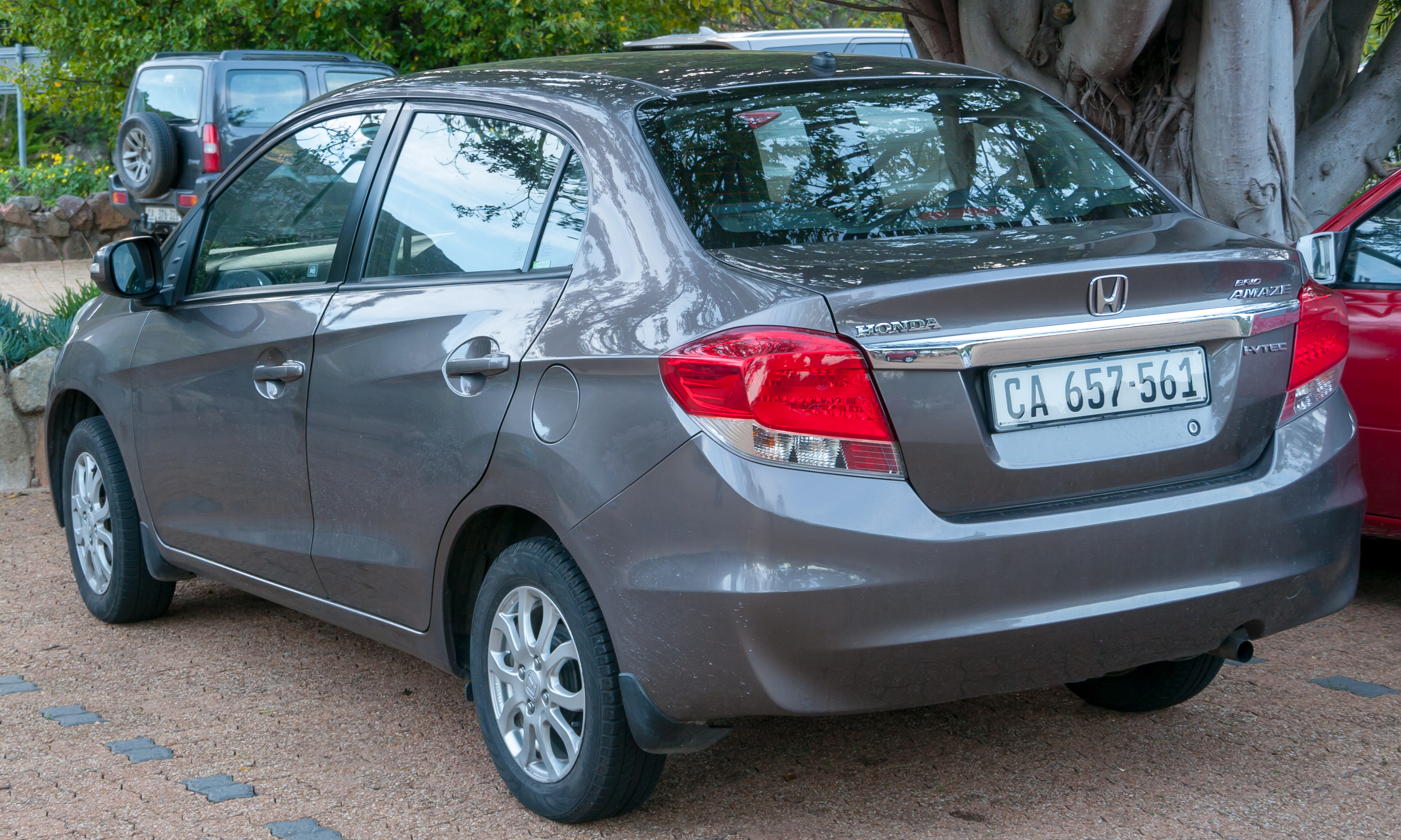
Brio Amaze (pre-facelift, South Africa)

The first-generation Amaze debuted in India in April 2013 and developed at Honda R&D Asia Pacific Co., Ltd. in Bangkok, Thailand. Manufactured at Honda's facilities in Greater Noida and Rajasthan, it was claimed to have a localisation level of more than 90%. It was also the first Indian Honda model to offer a diesel engine option. Petrol models were also available.

The 1.5-litre N15A1 four-cylinder turbo-diesel engine was first made specifically for the Amaze, which was later used in the Mobilio and the BR-V. Receiving the "i-DTEC" moniker, it was derived from the 1.6-litre N16A1 unit used earlier in the European market Civic. This India-specific derivative was developed around excise/taxation rules which offer lower taxes for cars of sub-4-metre cars with engine displacement of less than 1.5-litre. The turbocharger used in the diesel engine was designed and built by Honeywell. The engine was claimed to be the lightest in its class.

The Indian market Amaze was initially offered in E, EX, S and VX grade levels. In January 2014, the SX grade was added and positioned between the S and VX grades. In conjunction of the first anniversary of the Amaze in India, the Anniversary Edition was launched in April 2014.

The facelift occurred in 2016, which consisted of updated grille, dashboard design, taillights, and the use of continuously variable transmission (CVT) for petrol model, replacing the 5-speed torque converter automatic unit. The engine choices remain unchanged.

The Privilege Edition was launched in July 2017, followed later by the Pride Edition in January 2018.

==== Thailand ====
Sold as the Brio Amaze in Thailand, the grade levels offered were S and V. Both grades were powered by the 1.2-litre L12B3 i-VTEC four-cylinder petrol engine, which initially mated with either a 5-speed manual or a torque converter automatic transmission. The facelifted model was launched in May 2016, which dropped the manual transmission option and changed the torque converter automatic unit to a CVT.

==== Nepal ====
The Nepalese market Amaze was launched in June 2013. Three grade levels were available: E, EX and S, all powered by the 1.2-litre L12B3 engine and initially only offered with a manual transmission option. The facelifted model was launched in June 2016 which added the CVT option.

==== Philippines ====
Similar to Thailand, the car was sold as the Brio Amaze in the Philippines, which was launched at the Philippine International Motor Show in September 2014. CBU-imported from Thailand, the Philippine market Brio Amaze was powered by the 1.3-litre L13Z1 i-VTEC four-cylinder petrol engine mated with either a manual or a torque converter automatic transmission.

=== Safety ===
ASEAN NCAP test results Honda Brio Amaze (2016)
Test	Points	Stars
Adult occupant:	12.88	4 /5 stars
Child occupant:	45%	2 /5 stars
Safety assist:	NA	

== Second generation (DF5/6; 2018) ==
Second generation
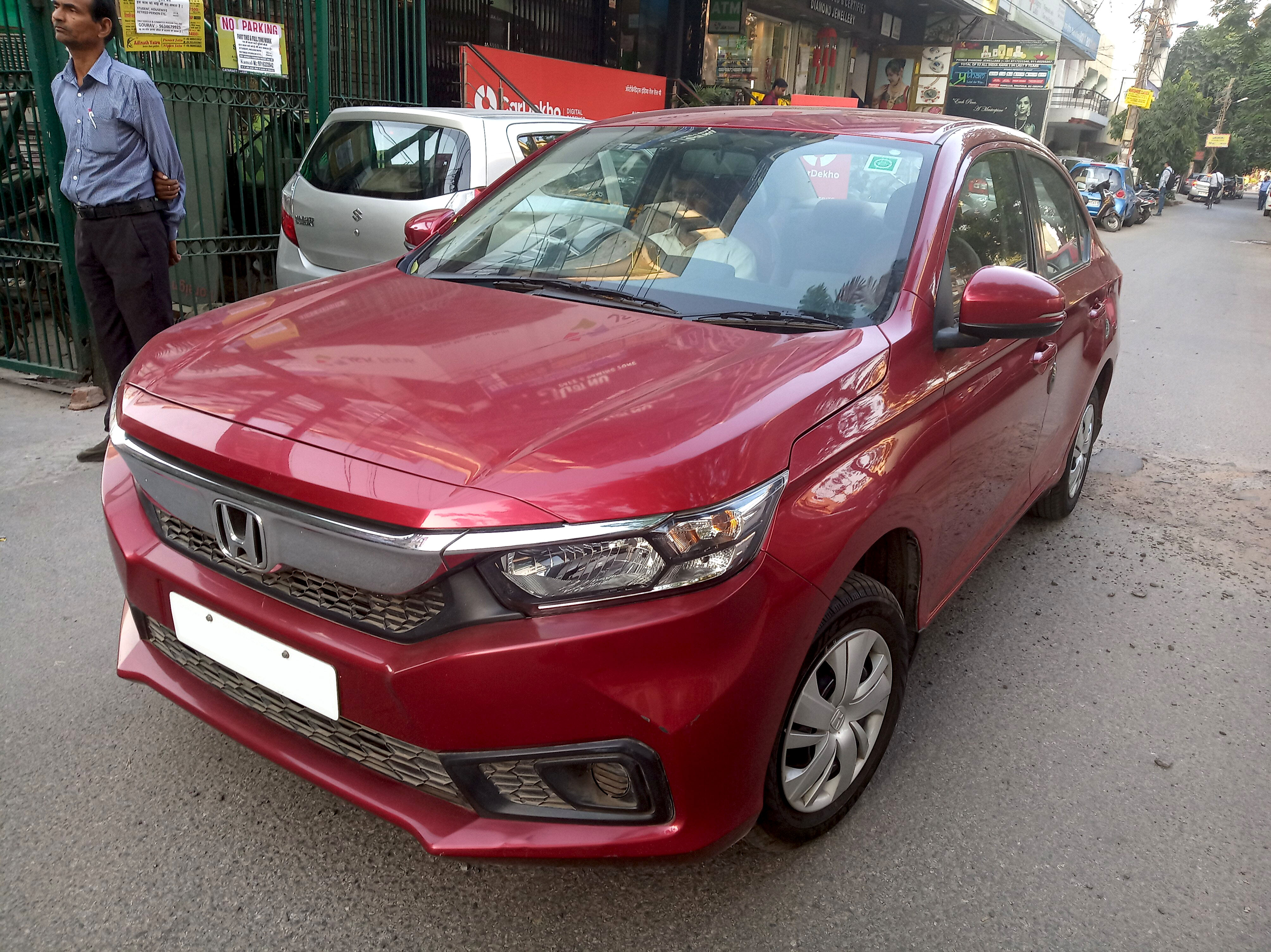
- 2018 Amaze (pre-facelift)

Overview
- Model code: DF5; DF6
- Production: 2018–2024
- Assembly: India: Greater Noida; Tapukara, Rajasthan (Honda Cars India)

Body and chassis
- Related: Honda WR-V (second generation); Honda BR-V (second generation)

Powertrain
- Engine: Petrol: 1.2 L L12B4 i-VTEC I4 (DF5); Diesel: 1.5 L N15A1 i-DTEC turbo I4 (DF6)
- Power output: 66 kW (89 hp; 90 PS) (1.2 L petrol); 59–73.5 kW (79–99 hp; 80–100 PS) (1.5 L diesel)
- Transmission: 5-speed manual; CVT

Dimensions
- Wheelbase: 2,470 mm (97.2 in)
- Length: 3,995 mm (157.3 in)
- Width: 1,695 mm (66.7 in)
- Height: 1,498–1,501 mm (59.0–59.1 in)
- Kerb weight: 905–1,040 kg (1,995–2,293 lb)

The second-generation Amaze was unveiled at the February 2018 Auto Expo in India, which Honda claimed to be built on a standalone platform (derived from the sixth-generation City). The looks of the new Honda Amaze was changed and the dimensions were also increased with a small margin. The ground clearance was increased by 5 mm (0.2 in) from 165 mm (6.5 in) to 170 mm (6.7 in). The diesel engine option is available with a CVT as opposed to the previous torque converter automatic unit. Initial grade levels offered were E, S, V and VX.

The facelifted model was launched on 18 August 2021, which dropped the V grade.

Honda Cars used "The Big Move" as catchphrase (slogan) for The Honda Amaze.

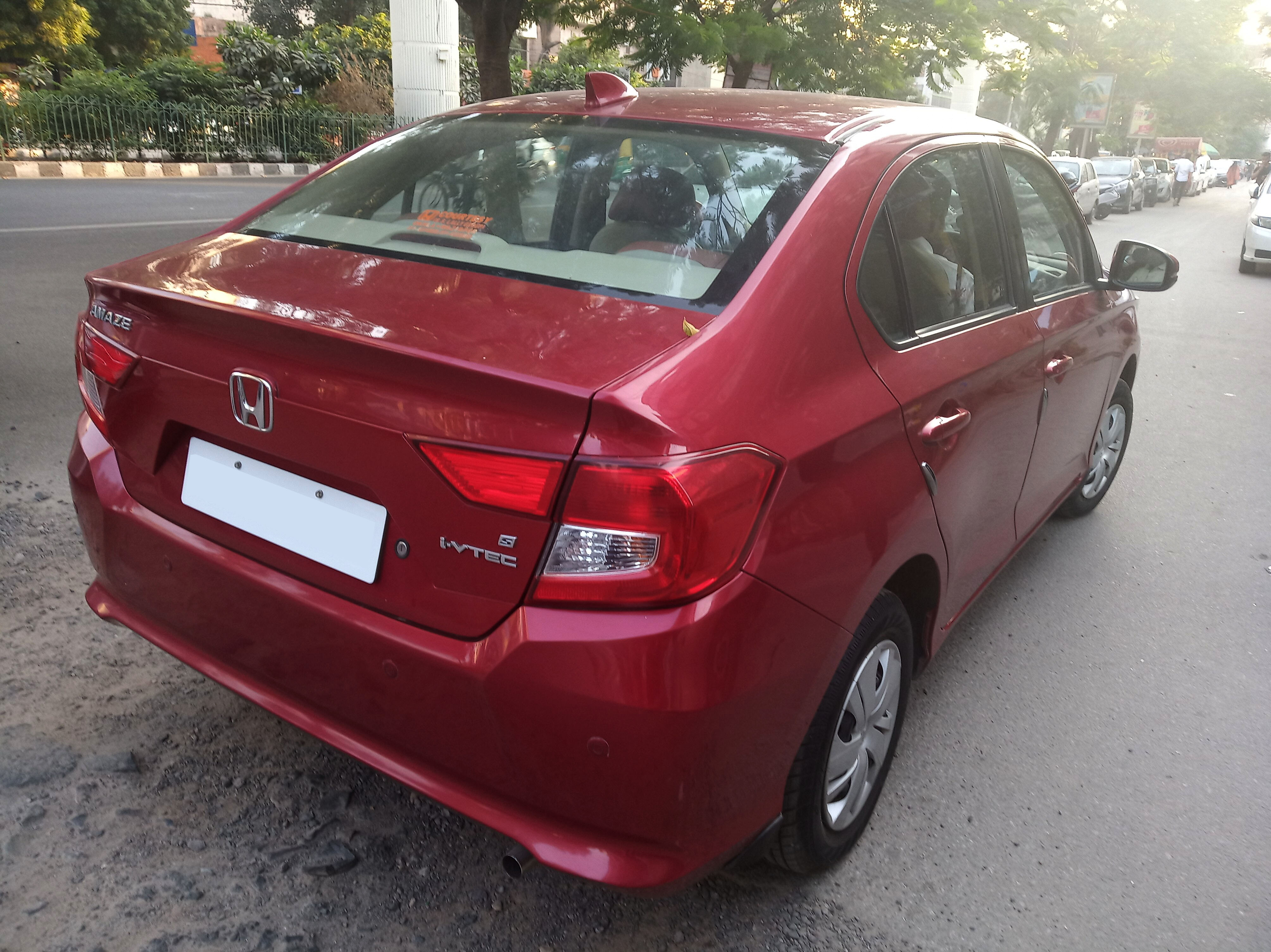
Rear view (pre-facelift)

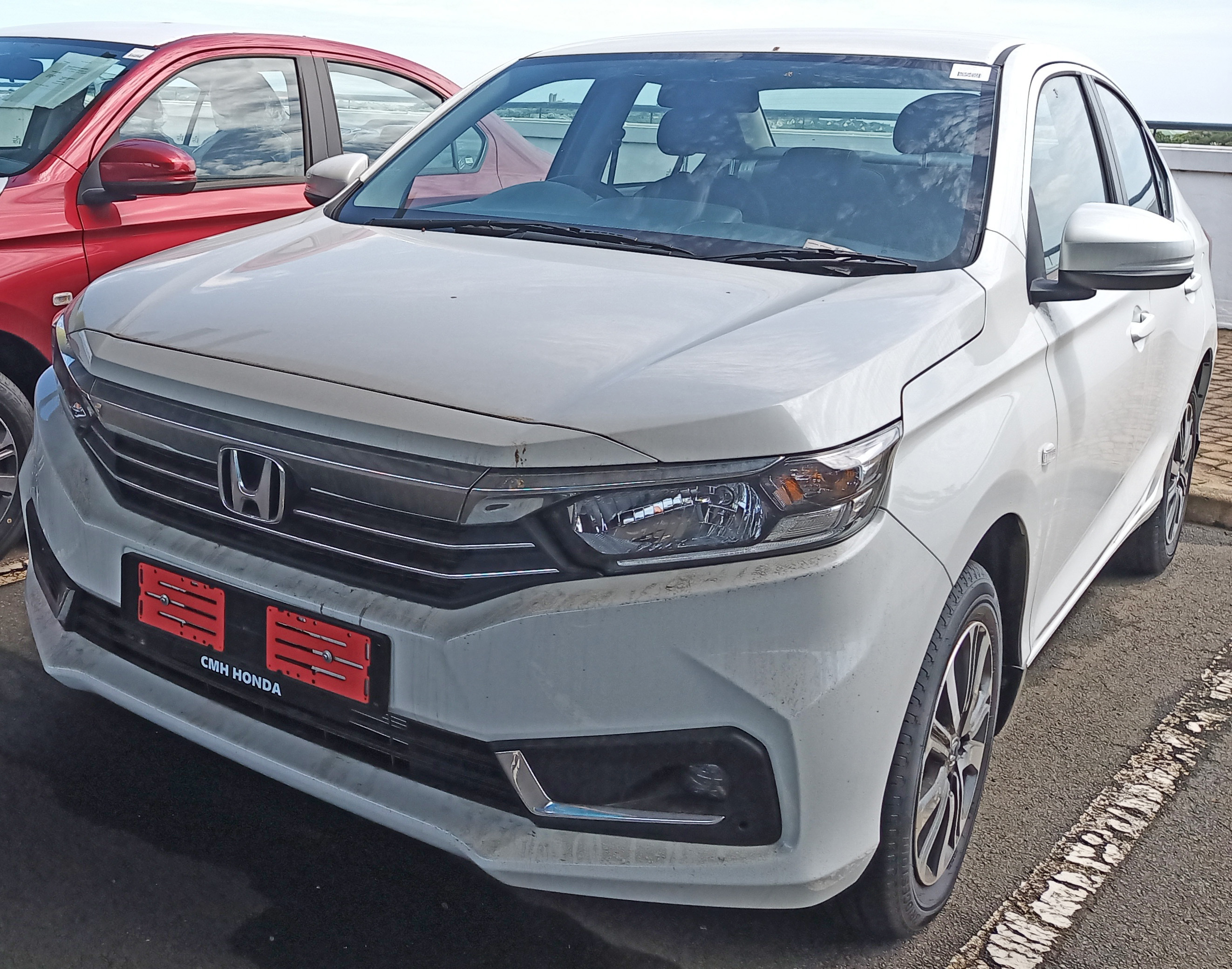
2023 Amaze (facelift)

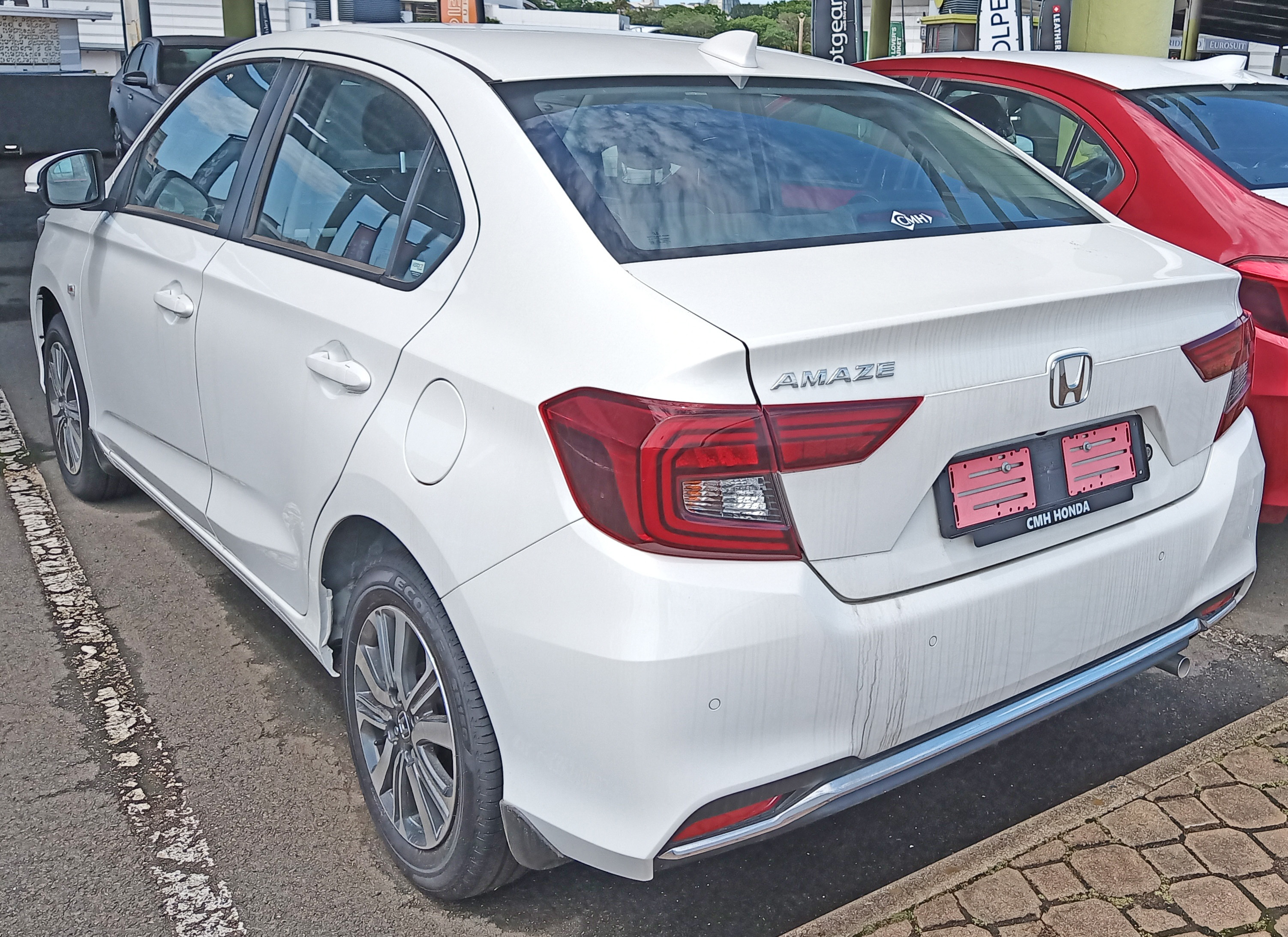
Rear view (facelift)

=== Powertrain ===
Type	Engine	Transmission	Power	Torque
Petrol	1.2 L L12B4 i-VTEC I4	5-speed manual	90 PS (66 kW; 89 hp) at 6,000 rpm	110 N⋅m (81 lb⋅ft) at 4,800 rpm
Petrol	1.2 L L12B4 i-VTEC I4	CVT	90 PS (66 kW; 89 hp) at 6,000 rpm	110 N⋅m (81 lb⋅ft) at 4,800 rpm
Diesel	1.5 L N15A1 i-DTEC turbo-diesel I4	5-speed manual	100 PS (74 kW; 99 hp) at 3,600 rpm	200 N⋅m (148 lbf⋅ft) at 1,750 rpm
Diesel	1.5 L N15A1 i-DTEC turbo-diesel I4	CVT	80 PS (59 kW; 79 hp) at 3,600 rpm	160 N⋅m (118 lbf⋅ft) at 1,750 rpm

=== Safety ===
The Amaze is fitted with two airbags and anti-lock brakes. In Africa, a driver-side seatbelt reminder is standard equipment, while in India, there are seatbelt reminders for both front-seat occupants.

==== South Africa ====
Global NCAP 1.0 (similar to Latin NCAP 2013) crash-tested an African market Amaze unit in 2019. In the frontal offset crash test, protection of the head was rated good and airbag contact was stable. Dummy readings of chest compression showed limited risk of serious injury. The passenger compartment remained stable. There were dangerous structures behind the dashboard that could increase risk of knee injury to occupants of different sizes or seating positions, and Honda did not demonstrate otherwise. The footwell remained stable and the pedals released as intended. Although the Amaze's total score was enough for a five-star rating for adult protection, it was limited to four stars because the African market unit on test did not have a seatbelt reminder for the front passenger (Honda would also have had to pay for a side impact test).

Using the Maxi-Cosi child seats selected by Honda, the head of a three-year-old child dummy contacted the interior of the car during rebound, and the armrest deployed, ejecting the dummy.

Global NCAP 1.0 test results (South Africa) Honda Amaze – 2 Airbags (2019, similar to Latin NCAP 2013)
Test	Score	Stars
Adult occupant protection	14.08/17.00	4 /5 stars
Child occupant protection	8.16/49.00	1 /5 stars

==== India ====
The Indian version received 2 stars for adults and 0 stars for toddlers from Global NCAP 2.0 in 2024 (similar to Latin NCAP 2016).

Global NCAP 2.0 test results (India) Honda Amaze (2024, similar to Latin NCAP 2016)
Test	Score	Stars
Adult occupant protection	27.85/34.00	2 /5 stars
Child occupant protection	8.58/49.00	0 /5 stars

=== Recall ===
In July 2018, Honda Cars India recalled 7,290 units of the Amaze in regards to a potential issue with the electric power steering. Affected units were manufactured from 17 April to 24 May 2018.

== Third generation (2024) ==
Third generation
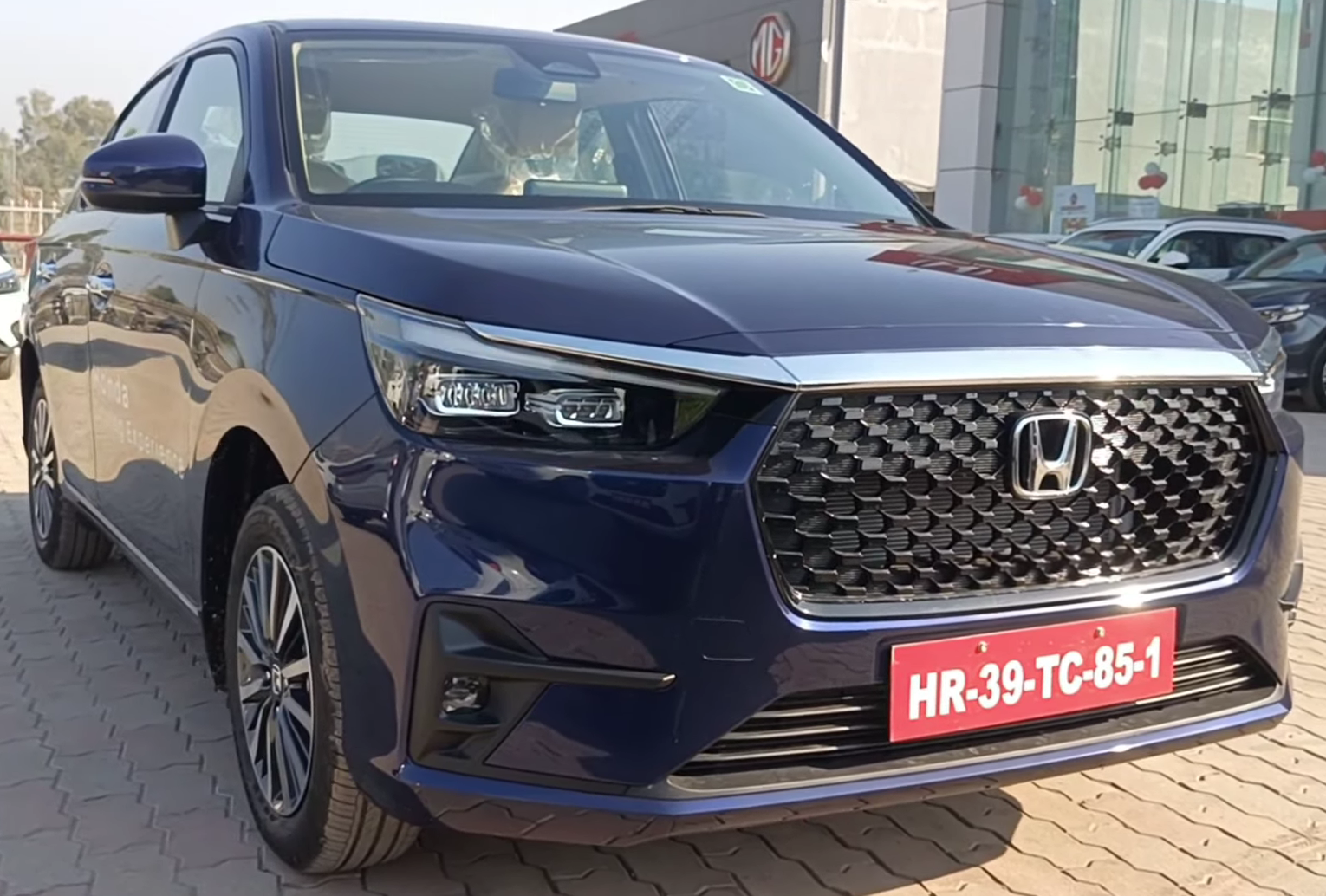
- 2024 Amaze ZX

Overview
- Production: 2024–present
- Assembly: India: Greater Noida; Tapukara, Rajasthan (Honda Cars India)

Body and chassis
- Platform: Honda Global Small Car
- Related: Honda City (GN); Honda Elevate (DG5)

Powertrain
- Engine: Petrol: 1.2 L L12B4 i-VTEC I4
- Power output: 66 kW (89 hp; 90 PS)
- Transmission: 5-speed manual; CVT

Dimensions
- Wheelbase: 2,470 mm (97.2 in)
- Length: 3,995 mm (157.3 in)
- Width: 1,733 mm (68.2 in)
- Height: 1,500 mm (59.1 in)

The third-generation Amaze was unveiled in India on 4 December 2024.

=== Markets ===
==== India ====
In India, it is available with three trim levels: V, VX and ZX.

==== South Africa ====
The Amaze was launched in South Africa on 20 May 2025, with two trim levels: Trend and Comfort, paired to either a 5-speed manual or a CVT.

=== Safety ===
The 3rd Generation Honda Amaze's Indian version received 5 stars for adults and 4 stars for toddlers from Bharat NCAP in 2025.

Bharat NCAP test results Honda Amaze (2025, based on Latin NCAP 2016)
Test	Score	Stars
Adult occupant protection	27.85/32.00	5 /5 stars
Child occupant protection	40.81/49.00	4 /5 stars

== Sales ==
Year	India	Thailand
2014	65,505	4,297
2015	63,831	2,153
2016	35,388	883
2017	28,314	969
2018	67,653	785
2019	67,715	
2020	37,484	12
2021	39,697	–
2022	46,528	
2023	40,382	
2024	29,690	
2025	32,900	
