= Henrique Mecabô =

Brazilian politician (born 1996)

- Mecabô in 2024

Member of the Chamber of Deputies
- Incumbent
- Assumed office 1 February 2027
- Constituency: Paraná

Personal details
- Born: 19 May 1996 (age 30)
- Party: New Party

Henrique Antunes Mecabô (born 19 May 1996) is a Brazilian politician who was elected member of the Chamber of Deputies in 2026. He has served as deputy mayor of Cascavel since 2025.
