= Henrique do Paraíso =

Brazilian politician (born 1985)

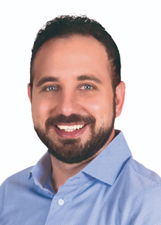

Mayor of Sumaré
- Incumbent
- Assumed office 1 January 2025
- Preceded by: Luiz Dalben

Member of the Chamber of Deputies
- In office 23 June 2021 – 17 October 2021
- Preceded by: Milton Vieira
- Succeeded by: Milton Vieira
- Constituency: São Paulo

Personal details
- Born: 7 June 1985 (age 41)
- Party: Republicans

Henrique Stein Sciascio, better known as Henrique do Paraíso (born 7 June 1985), is a Brazilian politician serving as mayor of Sumaré since 2025. From June to October 2021, he was a member of the Chamber of Deputies.
