= Henrique Gabriel =

Portuguese artist (1960–2023)

- Born: May 12, 1960; Vila Cova de Alva, Arganil, Portugal
- Died: September 11, 2023 (aged 63); Lisbon, Portugal

Henrique Gabriel (12 May 1960, Arganil - 11 September 2023, Lisbon) was a Portuguese artist. His artistic career covered a range of artistic expressions such as glazed tiles, painting, sculpture and graphic design.

== Life and work ==
Henrique Gabriel was born 12 May 1960, in Vila Cova de Alva, Arganil, Portugal. Upon conclusion of his high school degree, he became a student in the ARCA Plastic Arts course, in Coimbra, and later, in the ARCO Graphic Design course, in Lisbon.

He became a professional artist in 1978 as a resident artist of ARCA and exhibited his first show in 1981 as part of a collective showcase of the Coimbra Artists Movement. He had several individual and collective displays in the Madeira islands, around Portugal, as in Galiza, and in Barcelona and New York City.

His works were influenced by his many travels to Santiago de Compostela as a pilgrim since 1997. Since then, he dedicanted himself mainly to painting and glazed tile painting. On 18 April 2012 he presented his dissertation O Estranho Caminho de Santiago (The strange route of Santiago Compostela) in the context of the conference Conversas de Peregrinos (Pilgrim conversations), which took place inside the Convent of Christ, in Tomar.

Among others, one should point out the exhibition Caminho de Santiago, organised 2001 in Casa da Xuventude de Galícia, in Lisbon, and Salut a Carlos Lança, which took place in 2008 in the Municipal Library of Ovar, together with Carlos Alcobia, Luz Henriques, Carlos Lança, Licínio Saraiva and Bruno Varatojo.

On the same year, in April, he showcased the solo collection Rostos de Abril (Faces of April) in First Gallery, in Lisbon, where he depicted various prominent personalities of the Portuguese culture connected to the Carnation Revolution, as Adriano Correia de Oliveira, Carlos Paredes, José Carlos Ary dos Santos, Manuel Alegre, Mário Viegas and José Afonso.

In 2014, he presented the showcase Rostos das Palavras de Abril (The faces of the words of April), in the town Aljezur, which was again exhibited in 2017, in the town Moita.

In 2015, he was an invited artist to the show in Espaço Arte da Livraria Europa-América, together with the painters Alfredo Luz e Gustavo Fernandes, the sculptor João Limpinho and the photographer.

He also published several educational comic book strips dedicated to children. Henrique was the author of the frontpage of the magazines Nova Águia, and the literary works of the contemporary philosopher Agostinho da Silva and Livro de Cavalaria. His digital works should also be referenced.

In 2016 he published his book Arte Digital. Shortly before his death, he was preparing to publish his book H.GABRIEL - Images of the Ultimum Thinking and Objective Painting, which would feature a critical essay by José Luís Ferreira.

Gabriel died in Lisbon on 11 September 2023 in Lisbon, due to pulmonary disease.

== Works ==
- "Fiat Lux" (2009)
- "Em Cima Como Em Baixo" (2009)
- "Dualidade I" (2009)
- "Dualidade II" (2009)
- "Nascimento" (2009)
- "Conhecimento" (2009)
- "Caminho de Santiago" (2015)
- "Hormonas de Sisifo" (2016)
- "Covid Stop III" (2020)

=== Books ===
- Utopia Zero ou a Vestigialidade Reminiscente-Emersa na Mensagem duma Remota Era dos Atlantes (2020)
- Ferreira, José-Luis (2013). Hormonas para Sísifo. Henrique Gabriel (illustrator) (ebook ed.).
- Gabriel, Henrique (2016). Arte Digital (1st ed.). ISBN 978-989-20-6446-8.

=== Mestres da Língua Portuguesa ===
Frontpages and illustrations of the collection Mestres da Língua Portuguesa (English: Masters of the Portuguese Language):

1. Da pátria à frátria da língua / Jorge Chichorro Rodrigues ; il. Henrique Gabriel. - 1ª ed. - Lisboa : MIL - Movimento Internacional Lusófono ; Linda-a-Velha : DG, 2022. - 264, [7] p. : il. ; 15 cm. - (Mestres da língua portuguesa ; 32). ISBN 978-989-53656-9-2
2. Luís de Camões / Jorge Chichorro Rodrigues ; il. Henrique Gabriel. - 2ª ed. - Lisboa : MIL - Movimento Internacional Lusófono ; Linda-a-Velha : DG, 2022. - 81, [6] p. : il. ; 15 cm. - (Mestres da língua portuguesa. Narrativa poética ; 4). ISBN 978-989-99620-0-2
3. Teixeira de Pascoaes / Jorge Chichorro Rodrigues ; il. Henrique Gabriel. - 1ª ed. - Lisboa : MIL - Movimento Internacional Lusófono ; Linda-a-Velha : DG, 2022. - 201, [6] p. : il. ; 15 cm. - (Mestres da língua portuguesa. Narrativa poética ; 31). ISBN 978-989-53656-3-0
4. Jorge Amado, narrativa poética / Jorge Chichorro Rodrigues ; il. Henrique Gabriel. - 1ª ed. - Lisboa : MIL - Movimento Internacional Lusófono ; Linda-a-Velha : DG, 2022. - 233, [6] p. : il. ; 15 cm. - (Mestres da língua portuguesa ; 30). ISBN 978-989-53483-2-9
5. Eça de Queiroz / Jorge Chichorro Rodrigues ; il. Henrique Gabriel. - 2ª ed. - Lisboa : MIL - Movimento Internacional Lusófono ; Linda-a-Velha : DG Edições, 2021. - 71, [8] p. : il. ; 15 cm. - (Mestres da língua portuguesa. Narrativa poética ; 2). ISBN 978-989-53284-2-0
6. Carolina Maria de Jesus / Jorge Chichorro Rodrigues ; il. Henrique Gabriel. - 1ª ed. - Lisboa : MIL - Movimento Internacional Lusófono ; Linda-a-Velha : DG Edições, 2021. - 144, [7] p. : il. ; 15 cm. - (Mestres da língua portuguesa. Narrativa poética ; 29). ISBN 978-989-53284-1-3
7. Francisco José Tenreiro / Jorge Chichorro Rodrigues ; il. Henrique Gabriel. - 1ª ed. - Lisboa : MIL - Movimento Internacional Lusófono ; Linda-a-Velha : DG Edições, 2021. - 102, [7] p. : il. ; 15 cm. - (Mestres da língua portuguesa. Narrativa poética ; 28). ISBN 978-989-53135-9-4
8. Cecília Meireles / Jorge Chichorro Rodrigues ; il. Henrique Gabriel. - 2ª ed. - Lisboa : MIL - Movimento Internacional Lusófono ; Linda-a-Velha : DG Edições, 2021. - 70, [7] p. : il. ; 15 cm. - (Mestres da língua portuguesa. Narrativa poética ; 1). ISBN 978-989-53135-0-1
9. José Craveirinha / Jorge Chichorro Rodrigues ; il. Henrique Gabriel. - 2ª ed. - Lisboa : MIL - Movimento Internacional Lusófono ; Linda-a-Velha : DG Edições, 2021. - 55, [8] p. : il. ; 15 cm. - (Mestres da língua portuguesa. Narrativa poética ; 5). ISBN 978-989-53135-5-6
10. Camilo Castelo Branco / Jorge Chichorro Rodrigues ; il. Henrique Gabriel. - 1ª ed. - Lisboa : MIL - Movimento Internacional Lusófono ; Linda-a-Velha : DG Edições, 2021. - 177, [6] p. : il. ; 15 cm. - (Mestres da língua portuguesa. Narrativa poética ; 27). ISBN 978-989-53135-4-9
11. Antero de Quental / Jorge Chichorro Rodrigues ; il. Henrique Gabriel. - 1ª ed. - Lisboa : MIL - Movimento Internacional Lusófono ; Linda-a-Velha : DG Edições, 2021. - 77, [6] p. : il. ; 15 cm. - (Mestres da língua portuguesa. Narrativa poética ; 26). ISBN 978-989-53032-6-7
12. Fernando Sylvan / Jorge Chichorro Rodrigues ; il. Henrique Gabriel. - 1ª ed. - Lisboa : MIL - Movimento Internacional Lusófono ; Linda-a-Velha : DG Edições, 2020. - 140, [4] p. : il. ; 15 cm. - (Mestres da língua portuguesa. Narrativa poética ; 23). ISBN 978-989-54908-5-1
13. Era uma vez... Fernão Lopes / Jorge Chichorro Rodrigues. - 1ª ed. - Lisboa : MIL - Movimento Internacional Lusófono ; Linda-a-Velha : DG Edições, 2020. - 106, [4] p. : il. ; 15 cm. - (Mestres da língua portuguesa. Narrativa poética ; 24). ISBN 978-989-54908-8-2
14. Fernão Mendes Pinto / Jorge Chichorro Rodrigues ; il. Henrique Gabriel. - 1ª ed. - Lisboa : MIL - Movimento Internacional Lusófono ; Linda-a-Velha : DG Edições, 2021. - 161, [6] p. : il. ; 15 cm. - (Mestres da língua portuguesa. Narrativa poética ; 25). ISBN 978-989-53032-5-0
