= Henrique (footballer, born 1982) =

Brazilian footballer

Personal information
- Full name: Henrique da Silva Gomes
- Date of birth: August 20, 1982 (age 44)
- Place of birth: Rio de Janeiro, Brazil
- Height: 1.87 m (6 ft 2 in)
- Position: Defender

Team information
- Current team: RFCU Luxembourg

Youth career
- Botafogo
- 2006: Andirá

Senior career*
Years	Team	Apps	(Gls)
2006	FC Bleid	?	(?)
2007–2008	Reims	32	(0)
2008–2009	CSO Amnéville	?	(?)
2009–2010	FC Rouen	25	(3)
2010–2012	Racing Besançon	53	(1)
2012–2014	AS Beauvais	48	(3)
2014–2015	GF38	26	(0)
2016–2017	Angoulême CFC	?	(?)
2017–	RFCU Luxembourg	0	(0)
- * Club domestic league appearances and goals as of 7 July 2017 (UTC)

Henrique da Silva Gomes (born August 20, 1982 in Rio de Janeiro), known as Henrique, is a Brazilian professional football player. Currently, he plays in the Luxembourg National Division for RFCU Luxembourg.

He played on the professional level in Ligue 2 for Stade Reims.
