= Sumaré =

- Municipality
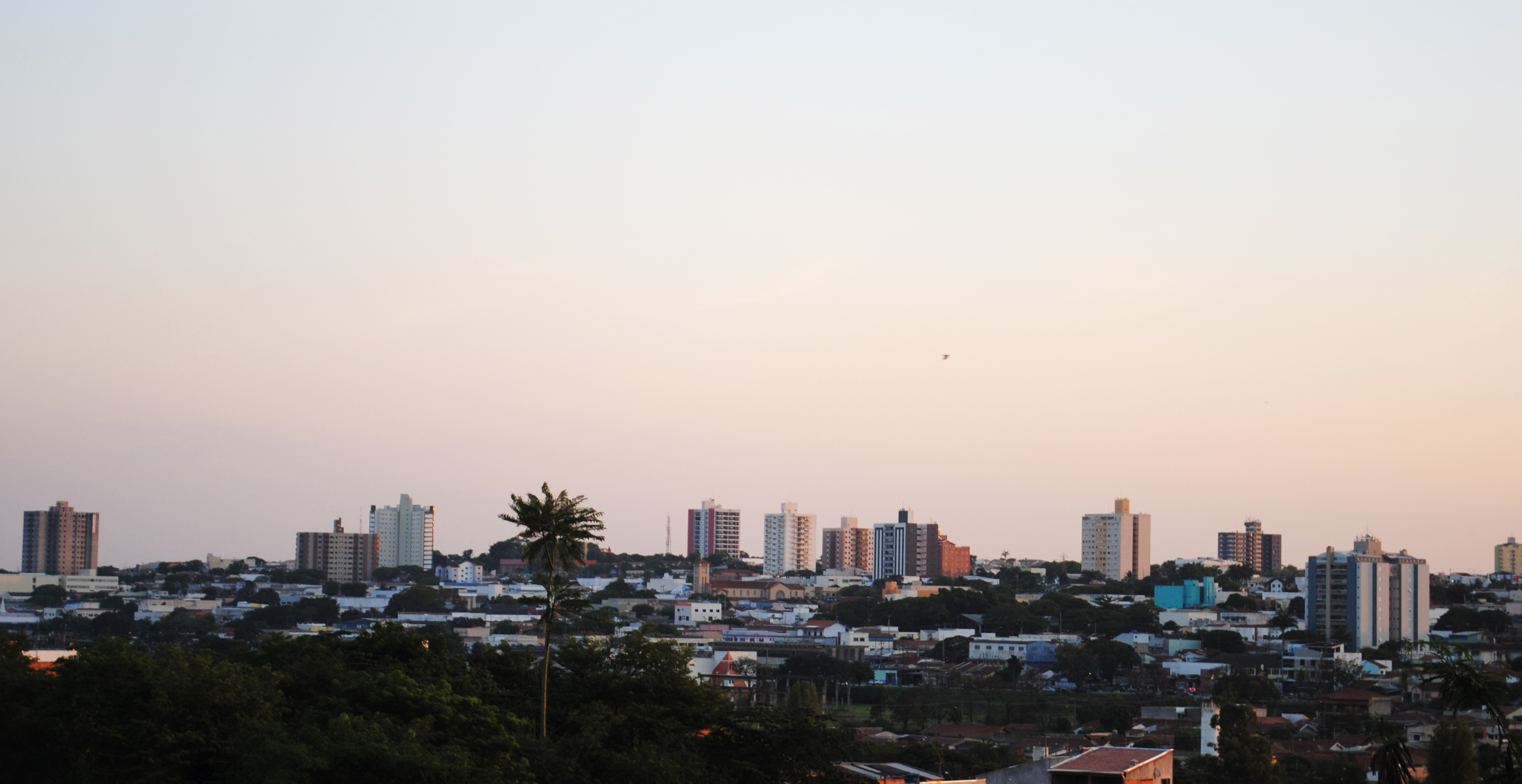
- Sunset in Sumaré

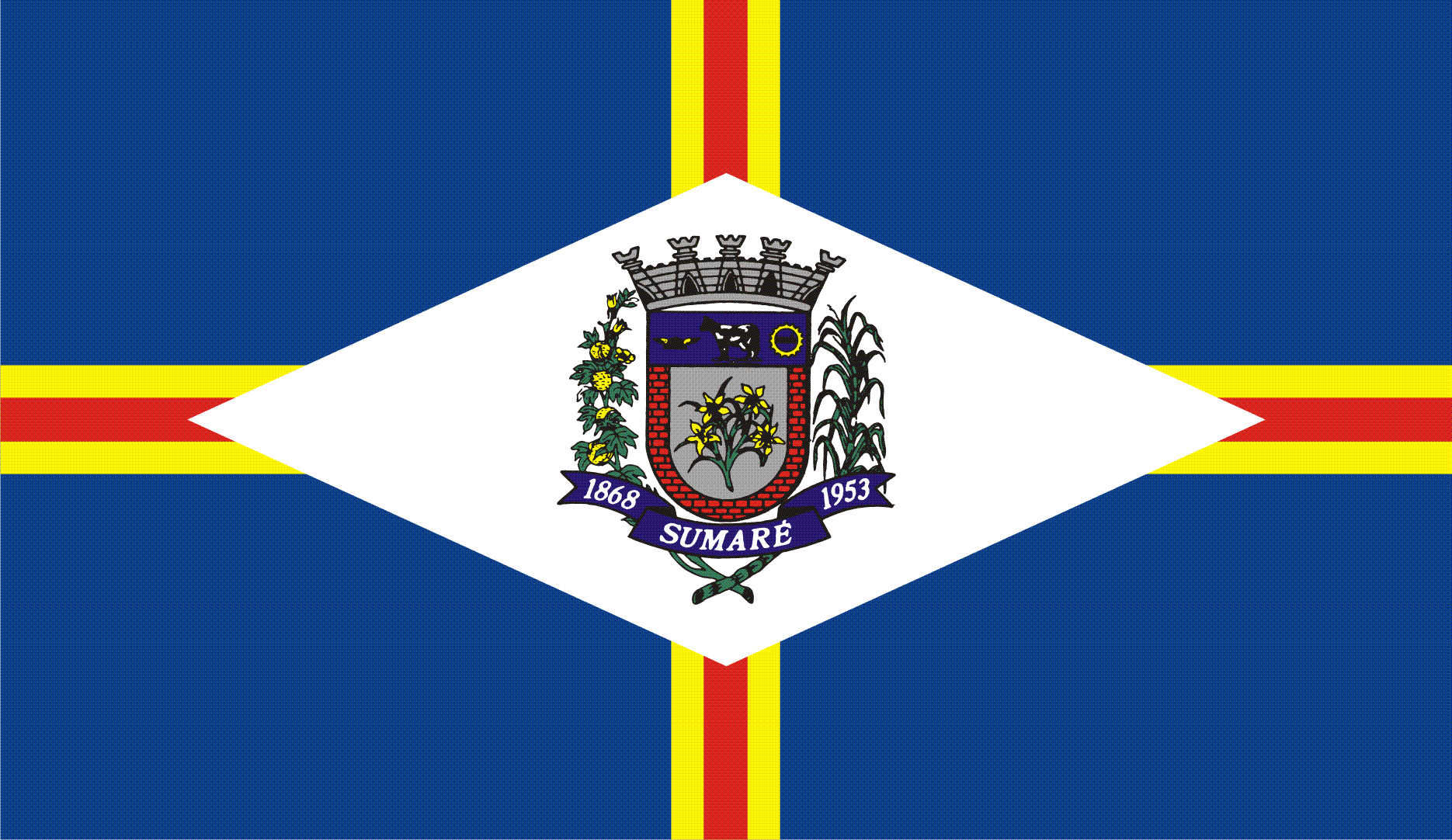
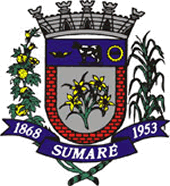
- Flag Coat of arms

- Location in São Paulo state

- Location in Brazil
- Coordinates: 22°49′19″S 47°16′01″W
- Country: Brazil
- Region: Southeast Brazil
- State: São Paulo
- Metropolitan Region: Campinas

Government
  - Mayor: Henrique do Paraíso (Republicans)

Area
  - Total: 153.47 km^{2} (59.26 sq mi)
- Elevation: 583 m (1,913 ft)

Population (2022)
  - Total: 279,545
  - Estimate (2025): 291,116
  - Density: 1,821.5/km^{2} (4,717.7/sq mi)
- Time zone: UTC−3 (BRT)

Sumaré is a city in the State of São Paulo, Brazil. It is part of the Metropolitan Region of Campinas. The population is 286,211 (2020 est.) in an area of 153.47 km^{2}. The elevation is 583 m. Sumaré was founded in 1868, after being upgraded to a city. Its old name was Rebouças. The municipality is formed by the headquarters and the district of Nova Veneza. Japanese car manufacturer Honda has a plant at the city from 1997 to 2021.

== Media ==
In telecommunications, the city was served by Telecomunicações de São Paulo. In July 1998, this company was acquired by Telefónica, which adopted the Vivo brand in 2012. The company is currently an operator of cell phones, fixed lines, internet (fiber optics/4G) and television (satellite and cable).

== See also ==
- List of municipalities in São Paulo
- Interior of São Paulo
