= Heinrich (given name) =

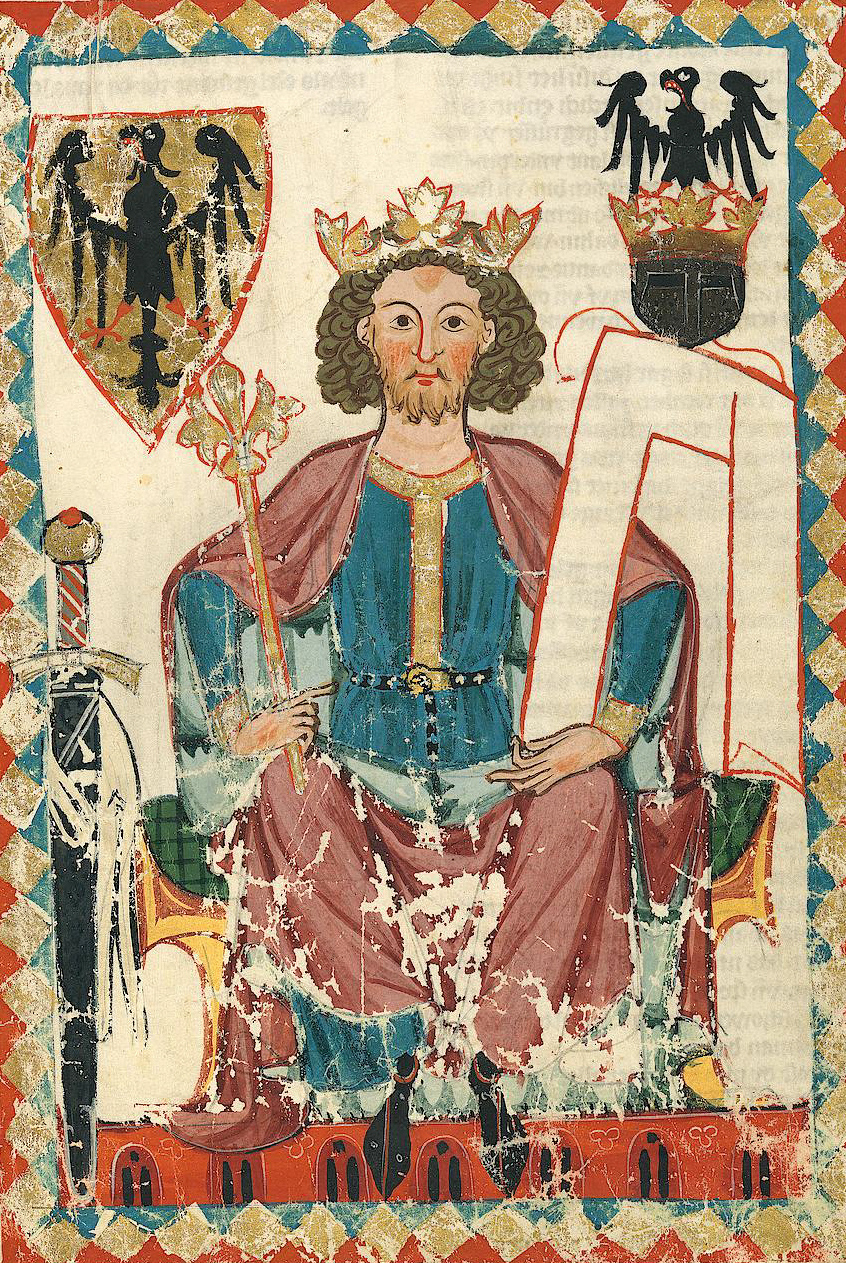
- Emperor Heinrich VI, of the Germans and Romans, 12th century
- Pronunciation: IPA: [ˈhaɪnʁɪç]
- Gender: Masculine
- Language: German

Origin
- Region of origin: German-speaking countries

Other names
- Variant forms: Hinnerk, Hendrik, Hinrich
- Short forms: Heike, Heiko, Heiner, Heinz
- Nickname: Heinie
- Cognate: Henry
- See also: Heinrich (surname)
- Popularity: see popular names

Heinrich (German pronunciation: [ˈhaɪnʁɪç]) is a German given name of ancient Germanic origin and a cognate to Henry. The female forms are Henrike and Henriette. The most famous patron saint is Henry (died 1024), as the German Emperor Henry II.

== Monarchs and royalty ==
- Henry the Fowler (Heinrich I der Vogler; 876–936), first German king
- Heinrich II (972–1024), Holy Roman emperor
- Heinrich III (1017–1056), Holy Roman emperor
- Heinrich IV (1050–1106), king of Germany, Holy Roman emperor
- Heinrich V (1086–1125), king of Germany, Holy Roman emperor
- Heinrich VI (1165–1197), king of Germany, Holy Roman emperor
- Heinrich VII (1275–1313), king of Germany, Holy Roman emperor
- Heinrich I, Duke of Bavaria (919/921–955)
- Heinrich II, Duke of Bavaria (951–995)
- Heinrich III, Duke of Bavaria and Carinthia (940–989)
- Heinrich IV, Prince Reuss of Köstritz (1919–2012), head of the German Princely House of Reuss
- Heinrich, Count of Bellegarde (1756–1845), viceroy of Lombardy-Venetia, Austrian Generalfeldmarschall
- Heinrich, Duke of Saxe-Merseburg (1661–1738), member of the House of Wettin
- Heinrich, Prince of Fürstenberg (1950–2024)
- Heinrich of Bavaria (1884–1916), member of the House of Wittelsbach, World War I officer
- Heinrich of Saxe-Weissenfels, Count of Barby (1657–1728), German prince of the House of Wettin
- Prince Heinrich of Prussia, several Prussian princes with the same name

== Archbishops ==
- Heinrich I, Archbishop of Trier (d. 964)
- Heinrich I, Archbishop of Mainz (served 1142–1153)
- Heinrich I, Archbishop of Cologne (1190–1238)
- Heinrich II, Archbishop of Cologne (1244–1332)

== Other people ==
- Heinrich Cornelius Agrippa (1486–1535), German astrologer and alchemist
- Heinrich Andergassen (1908–1946), Austrian member of the SS and Gestapo, executed for his role in the Holocaust
- Heinrich Aviksoo (1880–1940), Estonian politician and sports figure
- Heinrich Ignaz Franz Biber (1644–1704), Bohemian-Austrian composer and violinist
- Heinrich Boere (1921–2013), German-Dutch war criminal
- Heinrich Böll (1917–1985), German writer
- Heinrich von Brühl (1700–1763), German statesman
- Heinrich Bullinger (1504–1575), Swiss Reformer
- Heinrich Danckelmann (1889–1947), German Luftwaffe general sentenced to death for war crimes
- Heinrich Danioth (1896–1953), Swiss painter and poet
- Heinrich Deubel (1890–1962), German Nazi SS concentration camp commandant
- Heinrich Dusemer (died 1353), 21st Grand Master of the Teutonic Knights
- Heinrich Wilhelm Ernst (1812–1865), Moravian-Jewish violinist and composer
- Heinrich Ewald (1803–1875), German theologian
- Heinrich von Gagern (1799–1880), German statesman
- Heinrich George (1893–1946), German stage and film actor
- Heinrich Grünfeld (1855–1931), Bohemian-Austrian cellist
- Heinrich von Handel-Mazzetti (1882–1940), Austrian botanist
- Heinrich Hart (1855–1906), German literary critic
- Heinrich Heine (1797–1856), German poet
- Heinrich von Herford (c. 1300–1370), Dominican friar, historian, and theologian
- Heinrich Hertz (1857–1894), German physicist
- Heinrich von Herzogenberg (1843–1900), Austrian composer and conductor
- Heinrich Himmler (1900–1945), German Nazi officer and commander of the SS (Schutzstaffel)
- Heinrich Hoffmann (author) (1809–1894), German psychiatrist
- Heinrich Hoffmann (photographer) (1885–1957), German photographer
- Heinrich Holk (1599–1633), Danish-German mercenary, one of the principal commanders at the Battle of Wolgast, Battle of Lützen (1632) and Siege of Stralsund (1628)
- Heinrich von Kittlitz (1799–1874), German artist, naval officer, and explorer
- Heinrich von Kleist (1777–1811), German poet, dramatist, and novelist
- Heinrich Ritter von Kogerer (1819–1899), Austrian nobleman and government official
- Heinrich Wilhelm Krausnick (1797–1882), German lawyer and Lord Mayor of Berlin
- Heinrich Klaasen (born 1991), South African cricketer
- Heinrich Krippel (1883–1945), Austrian sculptor, painter, engraver, and illustrator
- Heinrich von Lüttwitz (1896–1969), German Panzer general during World War II
- Heinrich Marx (1777–1838) Prussian lawyer and father of Karl Marx
- Heinrich von Melk (born 1163), German satirist of the 12th century
- Heinrich Müller (disambiguation), several people with the same name
- Heinrich Parler (c. 1310 – c. 1370), German architect and sculptor
- Heinrich Prell (1888–1962), German zoologist
- Heinrich Scheidemann (c. 1595–1663), German Renaissance-Baroque composer
- Heinrich Schliemann (1822–1890), German businessman and amateur archaeologist
- Heinrich Schönfeld (1900–1976), Austrian football player
- Heinrich Schütz (1585–1672), German Renaissance-Baroque composer
- Heinrich Schwarz (1906–1947), German SS Nazi concentration camp commandant executed for war crimes
- C. Heinrich Stratz (1858–1924), German-Russian gynecologist
- Heinrich von Sybel (1817–1895), German historian
- Heinrich Thyssen (1875–1947), German-Hungarian entrepreneur and art collector
- Heinrich von Treitschke (1834–1896), German historian and political writer
- Heinrich von Tschirschky (1858–1916), German diplomat and politician
- Heinrich Uukkivi (1912–1943), Estonian footballer, bandy, and ice hockey player
- Heinrich von Veldeke (1140/1150 – c. 1190), Limburgish-German Medieval composer
- Heinrich von Vietinghoff (1887–1952), German colonel-general during World War II
- Heinrich Voes (died 1523), one of the first two Lutheran martyrs

== Fictional characters ==
- Heinrich, a character in the Conker series
- Heinrich, first name of the title character in the opera Tannhäuser
- Heinrich Zemo, a character in the Marvel Comics universe
- Heinrich, is one of the terrorists from Die Hard
- Heinrich Reichenau, a central character from Total Conquest
- Heinrich Leroyheimer, a character from the comedy skit "Das Negros" in Key and Peele.
- Heinrich Von Marzipan, from Codename: Kids Next Door

== See also ==
- Heinrich (surname)
- Heinrich (disambiguation)
- Heinrichs
