= Scheper =

Scheper is a Dutch surname meaning "shepherd"

- Hinnerk Scheper (1897–1957), German colour designer, mural painter, non-fiction author, photographer, monument conservator, restorer, state curator, and urban planner
- Jeanelle Scheper (born 1994), Saint Lucian high jumper
- Lou Scheper-Berkenkamp (1901–1976), German painter, colour and costume designer, and fairy-tale illustrator
- Mike Scheper, American football coach
- Nancy Scheper-Hughes (born 1944), anthropologist, educator, and author
