= Andreas Heinrich =

Andreas Heinrich may refer to:

- Karl Brandt (zoologist), Andreas Heinrich Karl Brandt the zoologist
- Andreas J. Heinrich, physicist working with scanning tunneling microscopy and nanoscience

== See also ==
- Heinrich
- Heinrichs
