= Heinrich (surname) =

Heinrich (German pronunciation: [ˈhaɪnʁɪç]) is a surname of German origin. Notable persons with that surname include:

- Alexander Geynrikh (born 1984), footballer from Uzbekistan
- Alisha Heinrich (1981–1982), American murder victim
- Andreas J. Heinrich, German physicist working with quantum technology and nanoscience
- Annemarie Heinrich (1912–2005), German-Argentine photographer
- Bernd Heinrich (born 1940), German-American biologist
- Carl Heinrich (1880–1955), American entomologist
- Cláudio Heinrich (born 1972), Brazilian actor
- Frank Heinrich (born 1964), German politician
- Gabriela Heinrich (born 1963), German politician
- Herbert William Heinrich (1886–1962), American industrial safety engineer
- Hartmut Heinrich (born 1952), German marine geologist and climatologist
- Jack Heinrich (1936–2025), Canadian lawyer and political figure
- Jacqui Heinrich (born 1988), American journalist
- Jörg Heinrich (born 1969), German footballer
- Kirk Hinrich (born 1981), American basketball player
- Martin Heinrich (born 1971), American politician
- Michael Henrich (born 1980), Canadian ice hockey player
- Schäfer Heinrich, German farmer
- Volker Heinrich, German naturalist

== See also ==
- Heinrich
- Heinrich (given name)
- Heinrichs
