= Henrich =

Henrich is both a surname and a given name. Notable people with the name include:

== Surname ==
- Adam Henrich (born 1984), Canadian former ice hockey player
- Allison Henrich (born 1980), American mathematician
- Bernhard Henrich, set decorator
- Bobby Henrich (born 1938), American former Major League Baseball player
- Christy Henrich (1972–1994), American gymnast
- Daniel Henrich (born 1991), German footballer
- Dieter Henrich (1927-2022), German philosopher
- Hermann Henrich (1891–1982), German composer
- Joseph Henrich, American anthropologist
- Michael Henrich (born 1980), Canadian former ice hockey player
- Rolf Henrich (born 1944), German writer and lawyer, a co-founder and leading member of the New Forum movement
- Tommy Henrich (1913–2009), American Major League Baseball player
- Robert Henrich (born 1986), American Airline CFO and Executive

== Given name ==
- Henrich Benčík (born 1978), Slovak former footballer
- Henrich Ernst Graf zu Stolberg-Wernigerode (1716–1778), German politician, canon, dean and author of hymns
- Henrich Focke (1890–1979), German aviation pioneer, co-founder of the Focke-Wulf company
- Henrich Herman Foss, Norwegian Minister of the Navy 1845-1848
- Henrich R. Greve (born 1966), Norwegian organizational theorist
- Henrich Jaborník (born 1991), Slovak ice hockey player
- Henrich Krummedige (1464–1530), Danish-Norwegian nobleman
- Henrich Oberholtzer (1739–1813), American whiskey distiller and founder of the Overholt Whiskey distillery
- Henrich Ravas (born 1997), Slovak football goalkeeper
- Henrich Smet (1535 or 1537—1614), Flemish physician and humanist scholar

== See also ==
- Heinrich (disambiguation)
- Henrik
- Henrichs
- Hendrich (disambiguation)
