= Hinnerk =

Hinnerk is a Low German given name for boys. The name is the Low German version of the name Heinrich. Therefore it also succeeds the old high German name Heimrich which is composed of the old high German terms heim (home, house) and rîhhi (powerful, prince). Accordingly, Heinrich as well as Hinnerk mean the same as "landlord", "the lord of the house".

== People ==
- Hinnerk Scheper, German painter
- Hinnerk Schönemann, German actor
