= Henrichs =

Henrichs is a surname. Notable people with the surname include:

- Benjamin Henrichs (born 1997), German footballer
- Bertina Henrichs (born 1966), German writer who writes in French
- Karl-Heinz Henrichs (1942–2008), German racing cyclist

== See also ==
- Henrich, a list of people with the surname or given name
- Heinrichs, a list of people with the surname
