= Mitten im Leben =

Mitten im Leben may refer to:

- Mitten im Leben (TV series)
- Mitten im Leben, a 2014 album by Udo Jürgens
