= Heinert =

Heinert is a German surname, a variant of Heiner; the surname may refer to the following notable people:

- Pat Heinert, American politician
- Ralph Heinert, American engineer and politician
- Troy Heinert (born 1972), American politician
