= Heinrich =

Heinrich may refer to:

== People ==
- Heinrich (given name), a given name (including a list of people with the name)
- Heinrich (surname), a surname (including a list of people with the name)

== Places ==
- Heinrich (crater), a lunar crater
- Heinrich-Hertz-Turm, a telecommunication tower and landmark of Hamburg, Germany

== Other uses ==
- Heinrich event, a climatic event during the last ice age
- Heinrich (card game), a north German card game
- Heinrich (farmer), participant in the German TV show a Farmer Wants a Wife
- Heinrich Greif Prize, an award of the former East German government
- Heinrich Heine Prize, the name of two different awards
- Heinrich Mann Prize, a literary award given by the Berlin Academy of Art
- Heinrich Tessenow Medal, an architecture prize established in 1963
- Heinrich Wieland Prize, an annual award in the fields of chemistry, biochemistry and physiology
- Heinrich, known as Haida in Japanese versions and the full-episode Netflix series, a character in Aggretsuko

== See also ==
- Heinie
- Heinrichs
- Henrich
- Henrik
