= Lou Scheper-Berkenkamp =

German artist

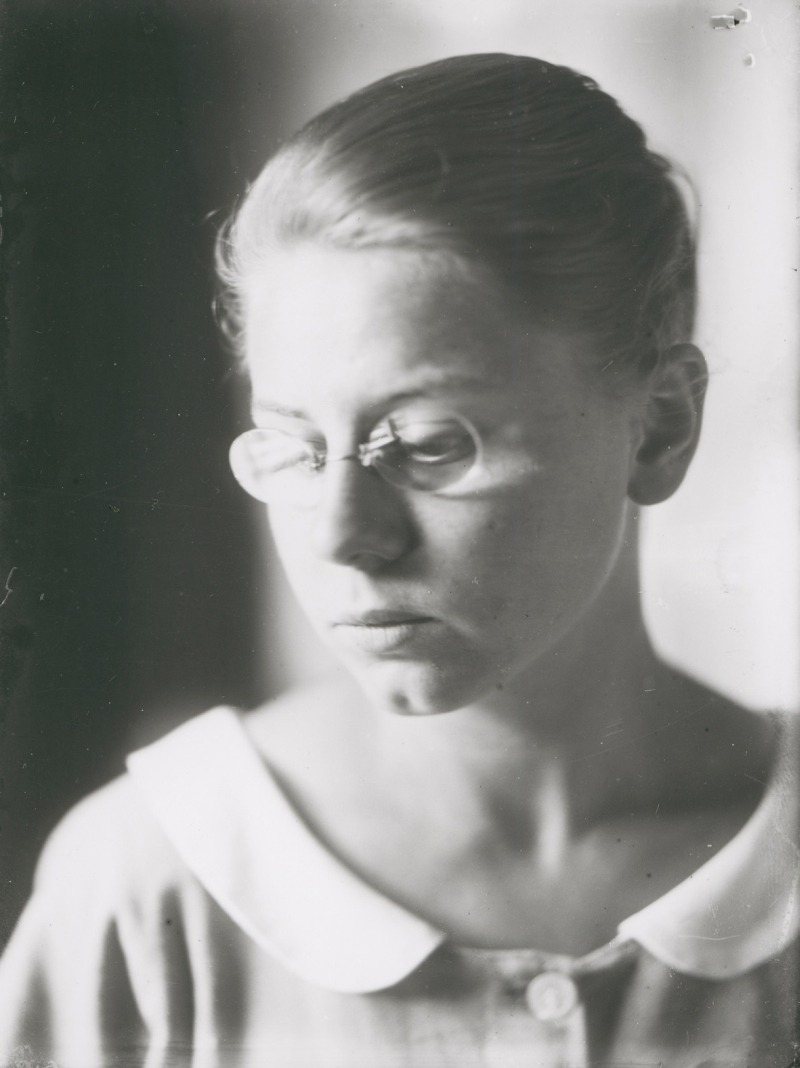
- Born: Hermine Luise Berkenkamp; 15 May 1901; Wesel, Germany
- Died: 11 April 1976 (aged 74); West Berlin
- Resting place: Waldfriedhof Zehlendorf
- Spouse: Hinnerk Scheper

Signature
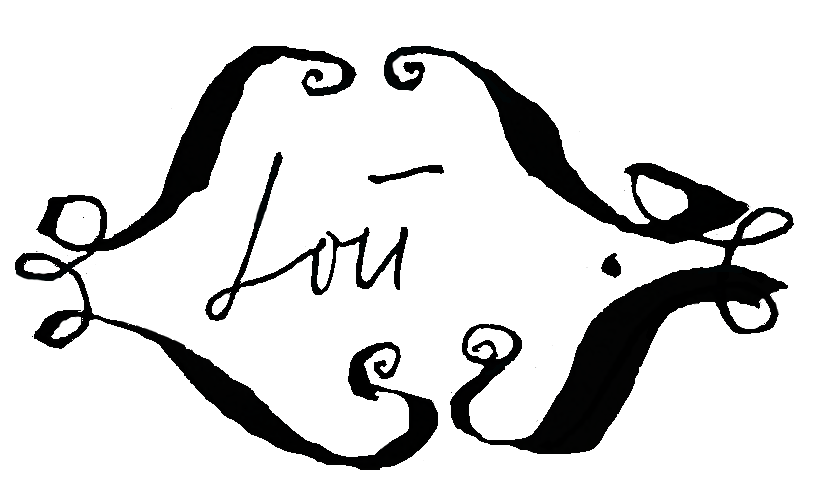

Lou Scheper-Berkenkamp née Hermine Luise Berkenkamp (15 May 1901 – 11 April 1976) was a German painter, colour designer, the avant-garde author of children's books, fairy-tale illustrator and costume designer.

== Early life ==
Lou Scheper-Berkenkamp was born in Wesel and was the daughter of Adalbert Berkenkamp (1868-1947) and his wife Laura Johanna Katharina Darmstädter (1872-1956). She had two brothers Alfred (1896-1917) and Walter (1910-1994). Her father and her uncle Heinrich, managed the paper and paper bag factory in Wesel which had been founded by her grandfather Heinrich Berkenkamp in 1865.

Lou Scheper-Berkenkamp graduated from elementary school, then attended a grammar school for four years and went on to attend the Viktoria-Schule in Essen, a girls' grammar school with progressive teaching. Through the art teacher Margarete Schall (1896-1939) her talent for colours and painting was discovered. Hermine Louise Berkenkamp originally wanted to study medicine or German philologie. But Margarete Schall, who herself later enrolled in the Bauhaus for a semester, suggested she study at the art school as it was known for its progressive teaching methods.

"In her school-leaving certificate of 4 March 1920, 'her marked talent for literary and artistic problems' is given positive recognition. Her 'very good performance in German and in drawing' is also confirmed. Gifts that marked the rest of her life."

— CHILDREN AND YOUTH LITERATURE - AN ENCYCLOPEDIA -

== The Bauhaus period ==
Color Wheel Johannes Itten 1961

After graduating from high school in 1920, Lou Berkenkamp enrolled at the Bauhaus in Weimar and studied under Johannes Itten, Lyonel Feininger, Paul Klee and Georg Muche. She became acquainted with Hinnerk Scheper, a classmate in the mural painting workshop there and married him on 24 December 1922 in Weimar. Berkenkamp lived with her parents in Wesel during the first years of her marriage, with their son Jan Gisbert, born in November 1923. During this time the first pictures letters were created.

In 1922 the couple left the Bauhaus Weimar and while Lou focused on her artistic work, Hinnerk Scheper worked as a colour designer. In 1925, he was called to the Bauhaus in Dessau as a master of the mural painting workshop at the Bauhaus Dessau. In 1926 their daughter Britta was born in Dessau. After Georg Muche, master woodcarver, left for Berlin in 1927, a semi-detached house became available and the Scheper family was able to move in. Lou Scheper-Berkenkamp worked - without matriculation - in the stage workshop of the Bauhaus under the direction of Oskar Schlemmer. Lou supported an important area of Schlemmer's work with the development of costumes, choreographies, sets and puppets for "Triadisches Ballett", premiere 1922 in Stuttgart, further developed by Oskar Schlemmer in 1926 with music by Hindemith. She designed and directed costumes and sets for the plays Ojdar“ and Circus and directed. In the group exhibition Junge Bauhausmaler (Young Bauhaus Painter), in Halle (Saale), she took 1928 part. She also created also a number of children's books until the couple's 1929 departure from Dessau. Family Scheper remained associated with the Bauhaus until its closure in 1933 and beyond.

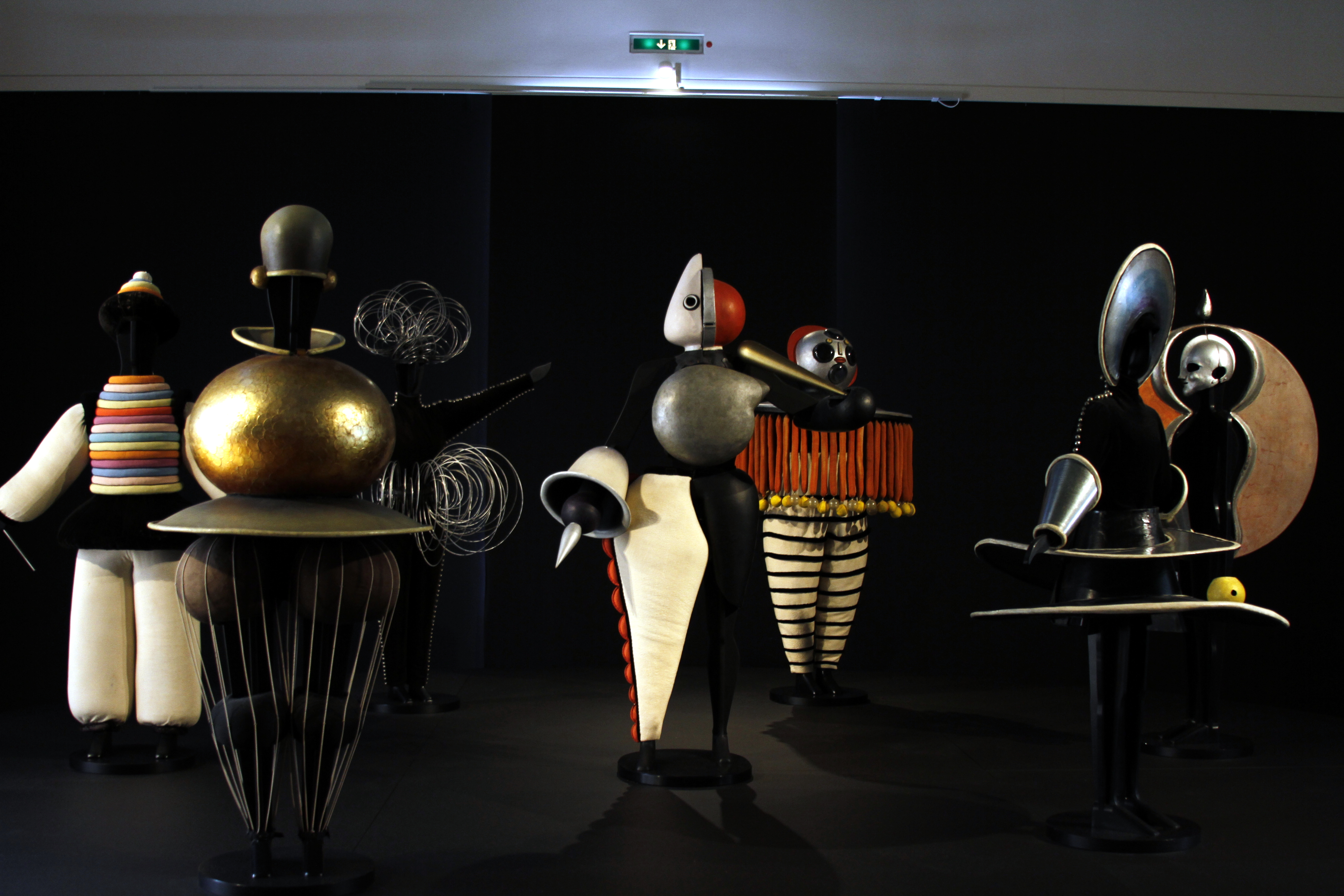
Figurines of the Triadic Ballet at the Staatsgalerie Stuttgart

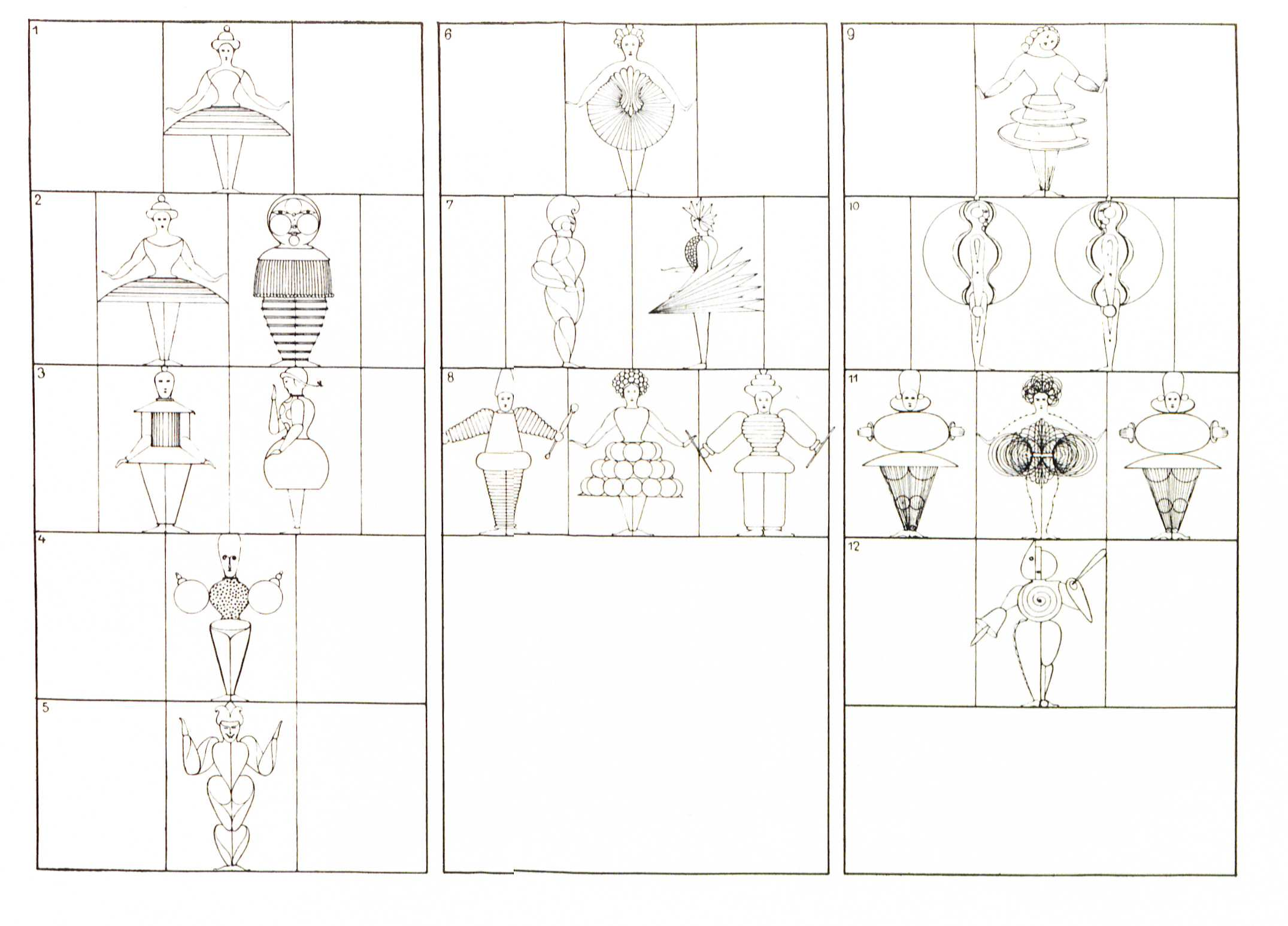
Choreography Triadic Ballet

== Moscow 1929 to 1931 ==
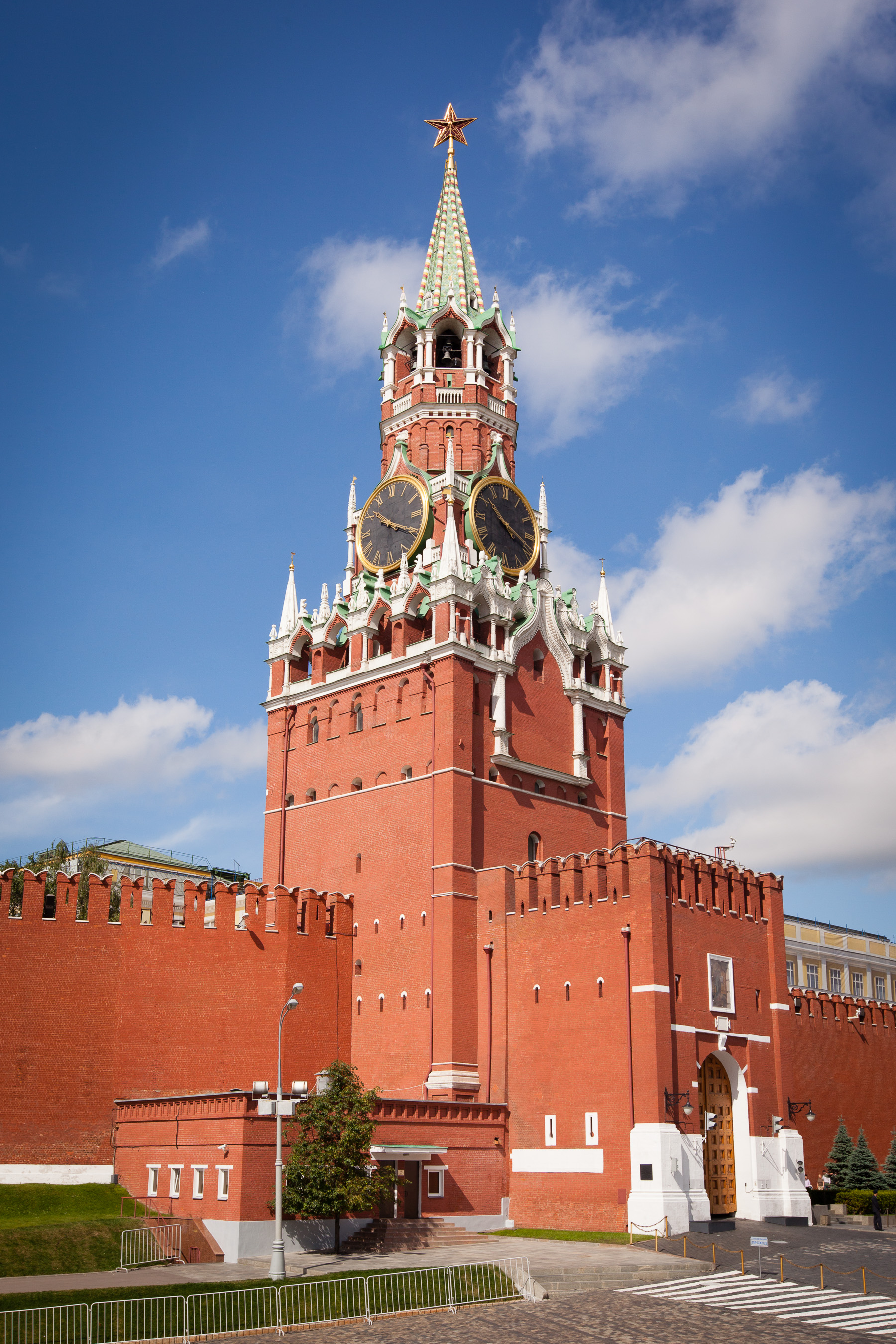
Redeemer Tower of the Moscow Kremlin

From July 1929 to August 1930 the Schepers followed a call to Moscow. Hinnerk Scheper, a specialist in colour design, was to set up a "Consultation Centre for Colour in Architecture and Cityscapes" (Russian Maljarstroj) for the entire Soviet Union. Together they worked on the colour plans. During this time Lou Scheper-Berkenkamp wrote articles for the German-language weekly Moskauer Rundschau (Moscow Review) In her contributions she captured the everyday life of people in the big city with an artistic hand and in a socially critical manner. In the service of her husband, she did not publish her own works in Moscow and supported Hinnerk in organizational problems. Inspired by the figures of the Triadic Ballet, she created collages of the basic forms circle, triangle and square. With her abstract work she critically opposed the standardization of architecture and the Soviet citizens. She painted Moscow's street life with ink and opaque colours. This resulted in ironic text and skillful picture designs.

"The Soviet star has by no means blinded us."

— Lou Scheper from the book by Renate Scheper 2007,5.55

== The National Socialism period ==
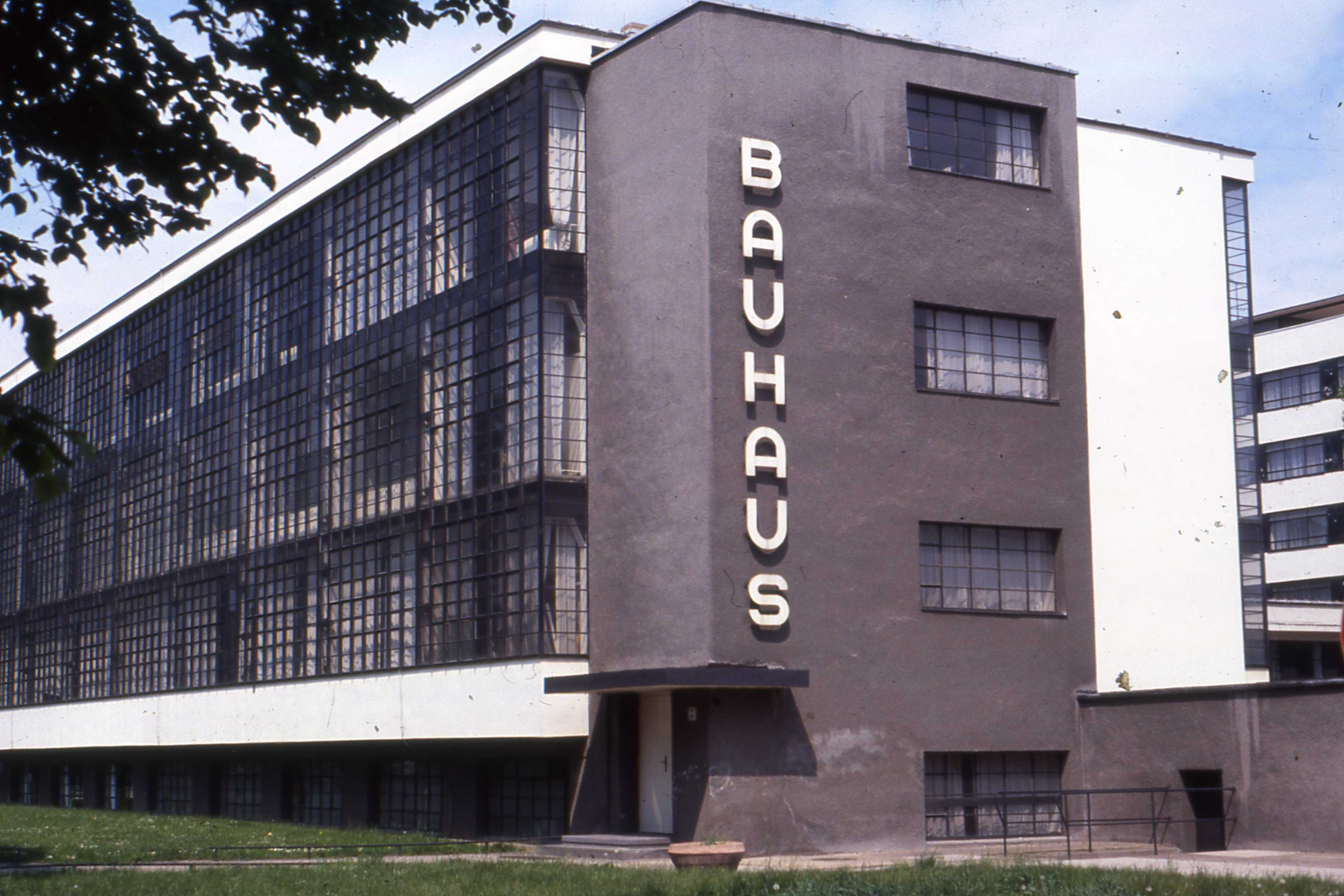
Das Bauhaus, Dessau, DDR May 1990 (5288787560)

After another shorter stay in Moscow in 1931, the Schepers returned to the Bauhaus in Dessau under the new director Ludwig Mies van der Rohe. When the Bauhaus moved in 1932, they also moved to the capital Berlin.

"Light-clear and dark-clear tones, pure white and pure black, varied shades of grey without contamination - that was the colour world into which the terrible brown, the burnt red of the Third Reich broke. What was before 1934 was buried and must be laboriously brought back to light, brought to consciousness.“

— Lou Scheper, review 1971,3. 179

Due to the worsening political situation in Germany in 1932, further cooperation with Soviet colleagues was no longer conceivable. The right-wing magistrate in Dessau, the leading faction in the city council since 1931, cut all funding for the Bauhaus. On 1 October 1932 the Bauhaus Dessau closed down involuntarily and under high political pressure. The building was used as the Gauführerschule of the NSDAP. Mies van der Rohe wanted to continue the Bauhaus in Berlin with his own funds under the title "Free Teaching and Research Institute" in the former Steglitz telephone factory, but the fascists forced him to close the institute on 20 July 1933. From then on, the teachers had to secure their livelihood with casual jobs. Some Bauhaus artists emigrated to Palestine and the USA.

"There are two ways to respond to disasters: by going mad or by getting into oneself.“

— Lou Scheper-Berkenkamp, Rudolstadt Palace Museum, 1948, p. 2

Since the closure of the Bauhaus in 1933, Lou Scheper-Berkenkamp worked as a freelance painter in Berlin. Between 1933 and 1945, Scheper-Berkenkamp designed a number of children's books, many of which were published following the Second World War by the publisher Ernst Wunderlich, Leipzig. Her son Dirk was born in Berlin in 1938. Lou accompanied Hinnerk on his "Norddeutsche Reportage-Reisen" and wrote texts for his various landscape photo series of landscapes. Repressions in 1934 against her husband Hinnerk, who was forbidden by the Nazis to join the Reich Association of German Photojournalists, also cut off this source of income for the family. So they concentrated on the colour design of public houses, murals and restoration work. Hinnerk Scheper did military service in Germany from 1942 to 1945. During this time, Lou provided for the family alone. She invented picture stories, which were not published as children's books until by Ernst Wunderlich Verlag in Leipzig. The family survived the war years in complete seclusion.

== After World War II ==
Lou Scheper-Berkenkamp and her children Britta, Jan Giesbert, Dirk and her parents, whose house in Wesel was destroyed by the war, had experienced the end of the war in Badbergen. In 1945 the Berlin magistrate appointed Hinnerk Scheper as a monument conservator and state curator of Berlin and his wife supported him in his work. From now on she devoted herself again to her artistic work and looked for a way to publish children's books. In the publisher Ernst Wunderlich from Leipzig she found the right contact person, with the best technical possibilities of offset printing and a great supporter.

"This was not the usual worlds of elves and dwarves, teddy bears and Easter bunnies, but an exciting new world, a bold and cheerful, playful and generous one. […] These picture books are bursting with life and movement [...] written by a ‘poet painter‘ who created a unity from text and image."

— Suse Wintgen 1947

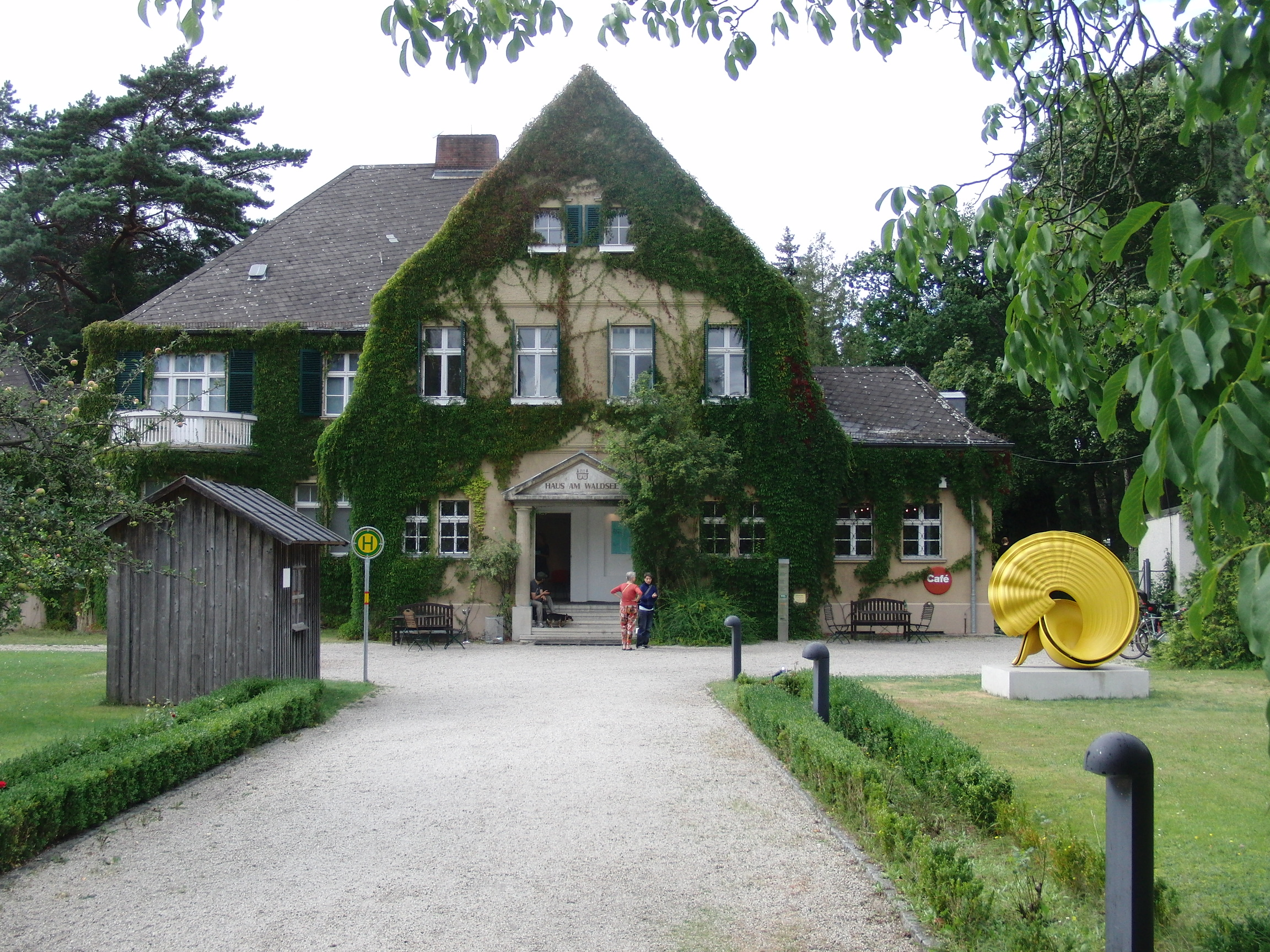
House at the Waldsee, Berlin

In 1950/51 she took part in "exhibitions of picture book originals". Her works were shown in "America Houses" in Kassel, Darmstadt, Frankfurt, Gießen, Marburg and Wiesbaden. These American institutions were established around 1950 in West Germany in the spirit of democratic educational work by the Allies. In the open, democratic and friendly atmosphere of these houses, Lou's timelessly artistic picture stories were able to unfold the narrative stream flow of their art.

=== "The Ring" 1951 Berlin Artists' Association Exhibitions and new projects ===
In 1951 Lou Scheper-Berkenkamp was one of the co-founders of the Berlin artists' association "The Ring", of which she was a member of the board until 1970. The members included Erhard Groß (1926-2011 Berlin), Wilhelm Peter August Helmstedt (3 September 1904 in Wilhelmshaven - 10 March 1976 in Berlin), Arno Mohr, Arthur Fauser, Peter Steinforth, Alfred Kubin, Wolf Röhricht, Siegmund Lympasik, Ulrich Knispel, Otto Eglau, Erich Waske, Georg von Stryk (Gory) (30 August, Dorpat - 14 December, Berlin), Walter Wellenstein (21 May 1898 Dortmund - 17 October 1970 Berlin), Erich Fritz Reuter, Gerhart Schreiter and Hans Szym. She exhibited with her artist colleagues for several years in the "Haus am Waldsee" in Berlin-Zehlendorf. Besides numerous participations in exhibitions in BRD and partly also abroad, Lou Scheper-Berkenkamp was actively involved in the „Professional association of visual artists“ in Berlin until 1970. Between 1956 and 1969 she was jointly responsible for the annual Great Berlin Art Exhibition. After Hinnerk Scheper's death in 1957, Lou Scheper-Berkenkamp took over his tasks in the field of colour design in the Berlin architectural scene. Among other things, she was involved in the colour design of the interiors of the last project realized by Otto Bartning, a Berlin children's home, the Berlin Philharmonic Hall by Hans Scharoun, the Egyptian Museum, various buildings by Walter Gropius in Berlin Britz, Buckow, Rudow and the Airport Building Berlin-Tegel. Until her death on 11 April 1976 Lou Scheper-Berkenkamp worked on the colour concepts for the Berlin State Library of Scharoun.

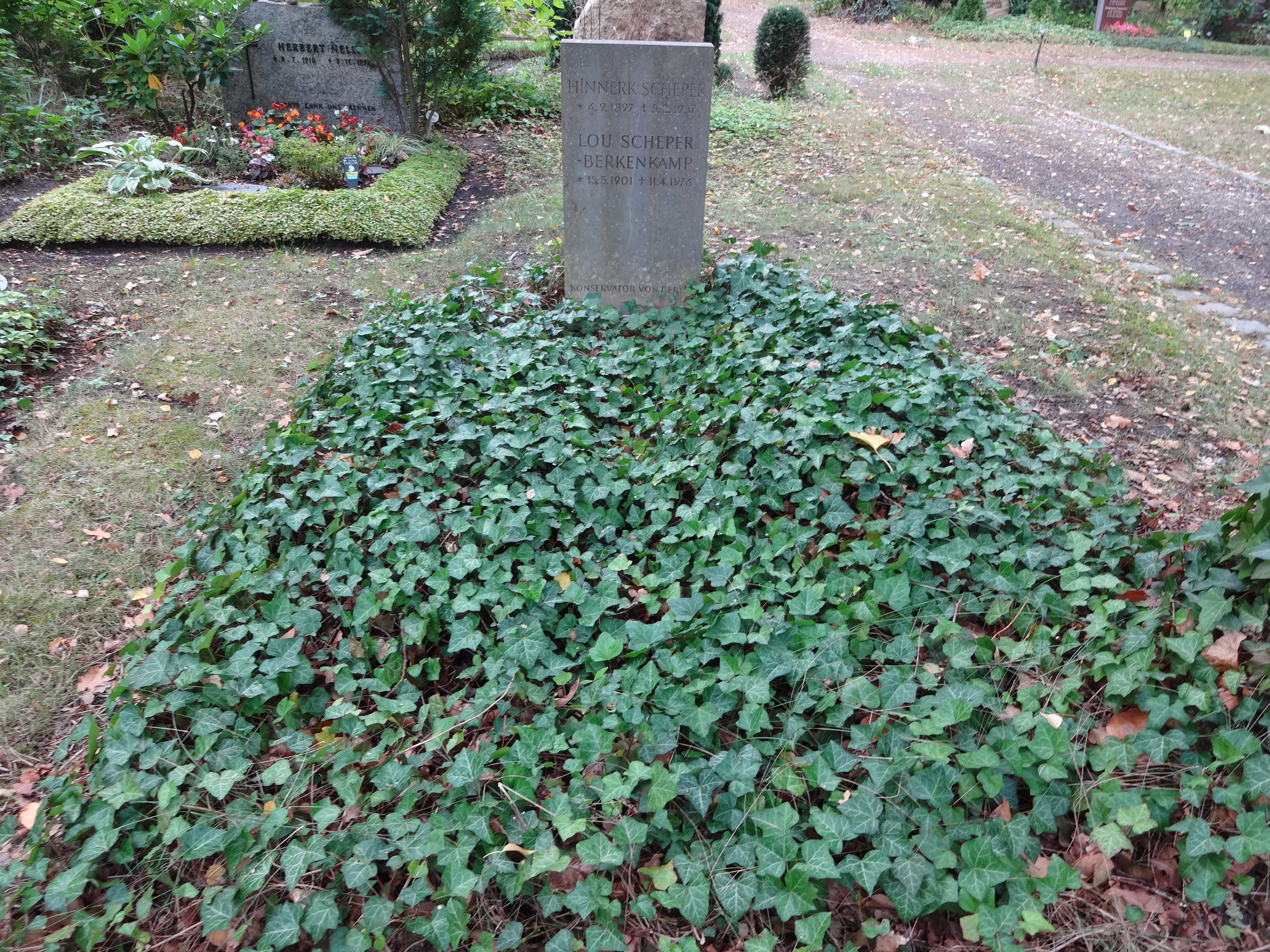
Scheper-Berkenkamp's grave in Waldfriedhof Zehlendorf Cemetery, Berlin

"There is little in the architecture and art of our time that has not been pre-felt, pre-formulated, anticipated at the Bauhaus, even if it rarely seems to be finished, not even always thought through to the end. A fragment, without doubt, this our now already legendary Bauhaus, transfigured by the charm of the unfinished."

— Lou Scheper, Rückschau 1971, p. 180

Following the death of her husband in 1957, Scheper-Berkenkamp worked as an architectural colorist, participating in a number of major projects, including Berliner Philharmonie by Hans Scharoun, Egyptian Museum of Berlin, and Berlin Tegel Airport.

Lou Scheper-Berkenkamp died on 11 April 1976 in West Berlin, at the time a landlocked enclave surrounded entirely by East Germany and connected to the rest of West Germany by a highway corridor. The couple's joint grave is in the cemetery Zehlendorf.

== Works ==
Scheper-Berkenkamp developed the color scheme for the interior of the Berliner Philharmonie

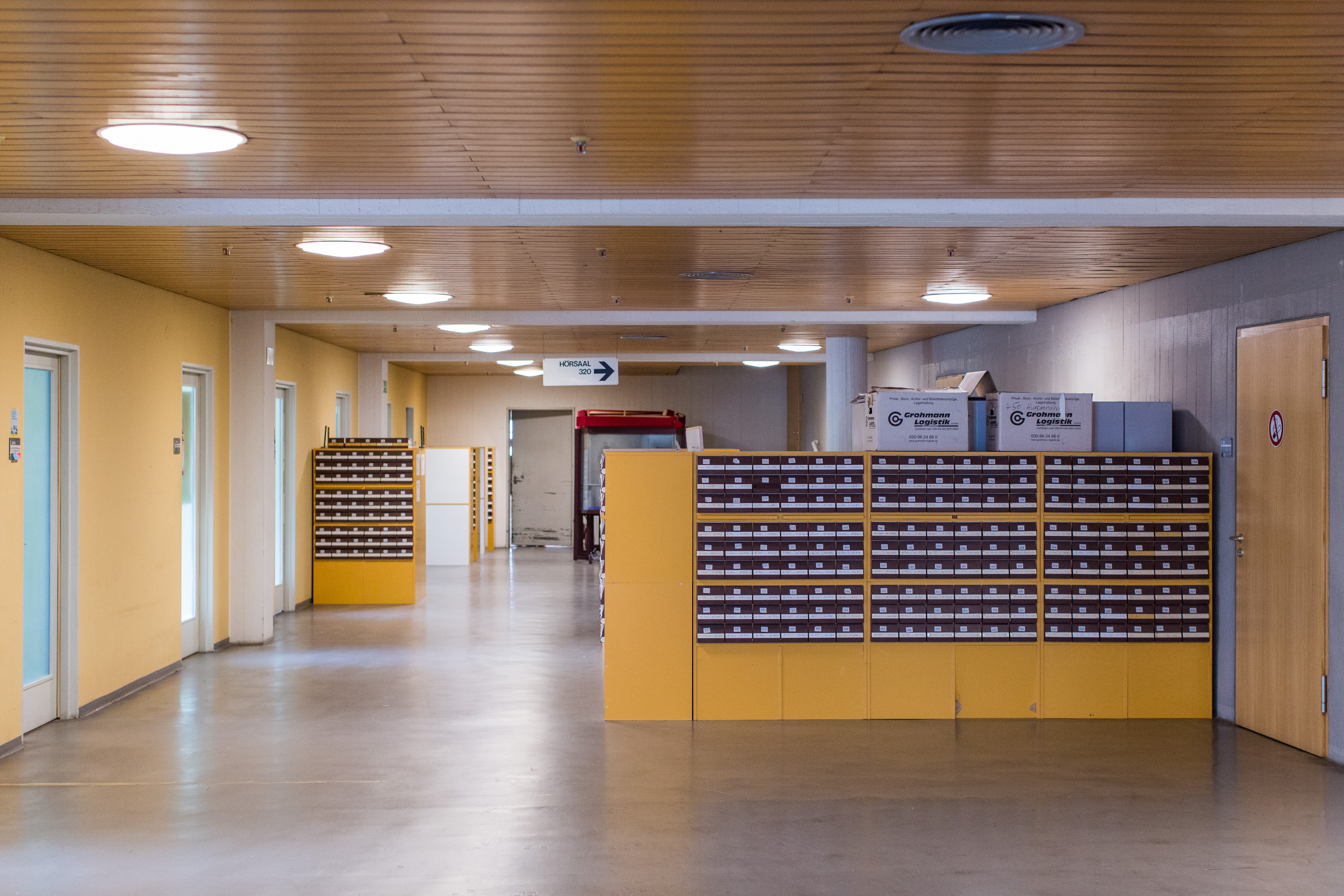
State Library of Berlin, Lou Scheper-Berkenkamp last work

== The Scheper family ==
22 December 1922 she married husband Hinnerk Scheper (Gerhard Hermann Heinrich Scheper) in the town church of St. Peter and Paul in Weimar.
The following children resulted from the marriage:
Jan Gisbert (born 7 November 1923)
Britta (28 March 1926 - 14 January 2012)
Dirk (born 21 August 1938)
Her daughter-in-law became the wife of son Dirk, Renate Scheper.

== Own literary works ==
- Lou Scheper-Berkenkamp art exhibition May–June 1948; Staatl. Schlossmuseum Rudolstadt Author: Lou Scheper-Berkenkamp; Publisher: Rudolstadt Heidecksburg Directorate of the Staatliches Schlossmuseum 1948
- Lou Scheper: witnessed and helped to shape - from the bauhaus to today. In: I-Dot COLOUR. Düsseldorf 3/1964.
- Scheper, Lou: Review. In: Neumann, Eckhard (Ed.): Bauhaus and Bauhäusler. Memories and Confessions. Dumont Paperbacks. Cologne: DuMont 1985 (EA Bern, Stuttgart 1971).
- The Narkomfin Community House in Moscow, 1928-2012: Dom Narkomfina (Russian Дом Наркомфина) - the House of the People's Commissariat of Finance: and the ICOMOS - ISC 20C - Madrid Document 2011 Author: Moissei Jakowlewitsch Ginsburg; Hinnerk Scheper; Lou Scheper-Berkenkamp; Johannes Cramer; Anke Zalivako; et al.
- Phantastics : the Bauhäusler Lou Scheper-Berkenkamp Authors: Lou Scheper-Berkenkamp; Annemarie Jaeggi; Edzard Reuter; Dirk Scheper; Renate Scheper; All authors Verlag Bramsche: Rasch, 2012.
- Ways to preserve the architectural heritage of the 20th century : Authors M IA. Ginzburg; Hinnerk Scheper; Lou Scheper-Berkenkamp; Johannes Cramer; Anke Zalivako; et al. Verlag: Petersberg : Michael Imhof, cop. 2013.

=== Picture letters Lou Scheper to Marie-Luise Betlheim 1922-1936 and Hinnerk Scheper ===
- Picture Letters : Bauhäusler Lou Scheper to Marie-Luise Betlheim : Weimar, Dessau, Berlin, 1922-1936 = (Croatian Ilustrirana pisma : Baushausovka Lou Scheper za Marie-Luise Betlheim : Weimar, Dessau, Berlin, 1922-1936. author Lou Scheper-Berkenkamp) Publisher: Zagreb : UPI2M PLUS and Museum of Contemporary Art, 2015.
- Map of the illustrated letters from Lou Scheper to Marie-Luise Betlheim (Croatian Mapa ilustriranih pisama Lou Scheper za Marie-Luise Betlheim) Author: Korana Sutlić Objavljeno (Published): 10.06.2015 at 07:18
- Picture Letters for Hinnerk Scheper Bauhaus Women: A Global Perspective from Elizabeth Otto & Patrick Rössler publisher HERBERT PRESS 2019

=== Published picture books ===
- Knirps, ein ganz kleines Ding Ernst Wunderlich, 1st-25th district, Ts. 1948. six-coloured offset printing, 16 pp. 10.5×14.8 cm. Stapled. Reprint: Berlin: Bauhaus Archive 2012.
- Doll Lenchen. Leipzig: Ernst Wunderlich 1st-25th pp. 1948. six-colour offset print,16 pp. 10.5×14.8 cm. Stapled. Reprint: Berlin: Bauhaus Archive 2012.
- Tönnchen, Knöpfchen und andere. Leipzig: Ernst Wunderlich 1948. six-colour offset print, 12 pp. 10,5×14,8 cm. Stapled.
- The stories of Jan and Jon and of their pilot fish. Leipzig: Ernst Wunderlich 1948. eight-colour offset print, 20 p. 29,7×21 cm. Paperback

=== Unpublished children's book manuscripts ===
- Bälkchen erzählt seine Geschichte 1948. Up 15,000. Liz. 154.20 pg. 29.7×21 cm (announced "In preparation").
- Die ernsthafte Geschichte von den vertriebenen und wieder versöhnten Gestirnen. For children from 8–14 years and for their parents, as far as they are not yet too grown up. Printing permission of the Cultural Advisory Council for Publishing of April 1948. ed. 20.000. 48 p. 29,7×21 cm (announced "In preparation").
- The blotter children and their dog. 16 S. (announced in 1948).
- Blümchens Abenteuer, eine wunderliche Geschichte. 14 S. (announced in 1948).
- The Vain Little Girl Story (created c. 1949).
- Sonderbare Reise eines kleinen Mädchens namens Tüttchen und eines namenlosen aber goldenen Kirchturmhahnes (design c. 1949).
- Carnival (design c.1949).
- The story of a child's last dream (design c.1949)

== See also ==
- Women of the Bauhaus

== Literature ==
- Canon Constitution and Canon Change in Children's Literature edited by Bettina Kümmerling-Meibauer, Anja Muller / Routledge New Yorg an London 2017 ISBN 978-1-138-93054-4 (hbk) ISBN 978-1-315-68038-5 (ebk)
- Dirk Scheper: Biographical data on the life of Lou Scheper-Berkenkamp, Berlin 1987, Bauhaus Archive Berlin
- Ulrike Müller: Bauhaus women. Masters in Art, Craft and Design, Munich 2009
- Barbara Murken: "Actually, I'd rather sit as the crow flies than in a chair..." The magical world of images of the Bauhaus artist Lou Scheper-Berkenkamp, in: The Book Castle. News from the International Youth Library 2009, Munich 2010, pp. 77–84
- Bauhaus Archive Berlin / Museum of Design, Fantastics: The Bauhäusler Lou Scheper-Berkenkamp, Berlin 2012
- Lou Scheper-Berkenkamp. In: Elizabeth Otto, Patrick Rösler (Ed.): Women at the * Bauhaus. Pioneering women artists of the modern age. Knesebeck, Munich 2019. ISBN 978-3-95728-230-9. pp. 44–45.
- Lou Scheper-Berkenkamp. Catalogue of the Staatl. Schlossmuseum Rudolstadt. Text: Suse Wintgen. Rudolstadt 1948.
- Detlef Hoffmann: History of dolls. In: Doderer, Encyclopedia of Children's and Youth Literature, 1979, pp. 99–104.
- Bettina Hürlimann: European children's books in three centuries. Zurich, Freiburg: Atlantis 1959.
