= Heiner =

Heiner is a German male name, a diminutive of Heinrich, and also a surname.

== Given name ==
- Heiner Backhaus (born 1982), football player
- Heiner Baltes (born 1949), football player
- Heiner Brand (born 1952), West German handball player
- Heiner Dopp (born 1956), West German hockey player
- Heiner Geißler (1930–2017), German politician
- Heiner Goebbels (born 1952), German composer and music director
- Heiner Lauterbach (born 1953), German actor
- Heiner Möller (born 1952), West German handball player
- Heiner Mühlmann (born 1938), German philosopher
- Heiner Müller (1929–1995), German dramatist, poet, writer, essayist and theatre director
- Heiner Wilmer (born 1961), German Roman Catholic bishop
- Heiner Zieschang (1936–2004), German mathematician
- Klaus-Heiner Lehne (born 1957), German politician

== Family name ==
- Daniel Brodhead Heiner (1854–1944), American politician from Pennsylvania
- Kenneth Heiner-Møller (born 1971), Danish football player and manager
- Ludwig Heiner (1883 – between 1915 and 1925), Austrian pastry chef
- Madeline Heiner (born 1987), Australian runner

== See also for ==
- Heiner Brau, microbrewery and brewing museum located in the historic Passenger Rail Station building in Covington, Louisiana, United States
