= Prince Henry of Prussia =

Prince Henry of Prussia may refer to:

- Prince Henry of Prussia (1726–1802), son of King Frederick William I of Prussia
- Prince Henry of Prussia (1747–1767), son of Prince Augustus William of Prussia
- Prince Henry of Prussia (1781–1846), son of King Frederick William II of Prussia
- Prince Henry of Prussia (1862–1929), son of German Emperor Frederick III
- Prince Henry of Prussia (1900–1904), son of the previous
