= Heinrich von Melk =

12th-century German satirist

Heinrich von Melk was a German satirist of the twelfth century; of knightly birth and probably a lay brother in the convent of Melk, in present-day Lower Austria.
