= Schäfer Heinrich =

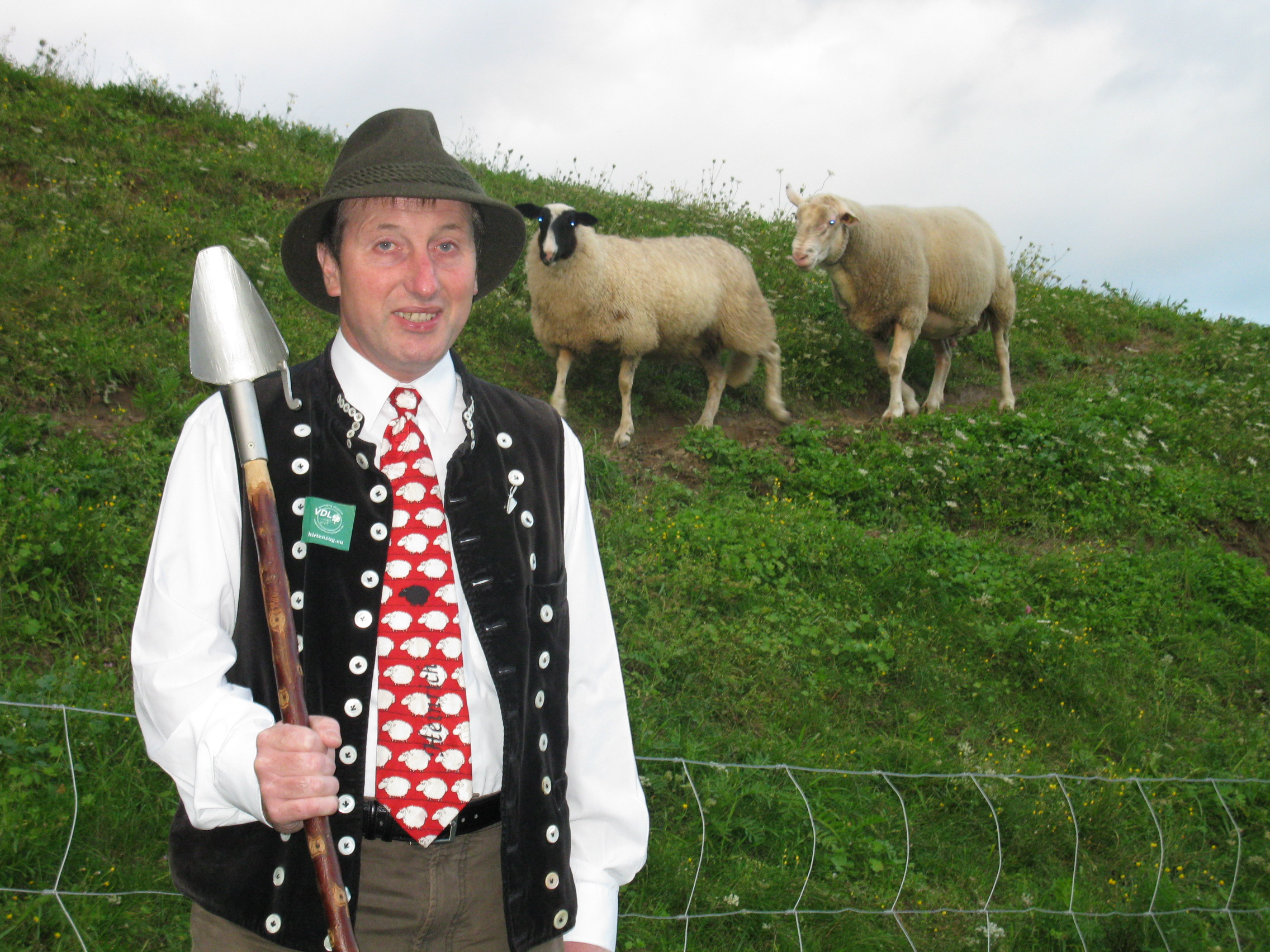
Schäfer Heinrich with some of his sheep (2010)

Heinrich Gersmeier, better known as Schäfer Heinrich, is a German farmer, who was looking for a woman in the German TV show Bauer sucht Frau. He sang a song about his life as shepherd.

== Personal life ==
He keeps 400 sheep on his farm in the "Hellweg Börde". After the death of his father in 1998, he lived with his mother Johanna in Völlinghausen (City Erwitte). In 2008 he was a candidate at the German TV Show "Bauer sucht Frau". At this show he sang "Das Schäferlied" ("The shepherd song"). He sang this song often at village festivals, was recorded with EMI Music. The song was a top 10 hit in Germany and reached No.5.

He sang at many music festivals, in discos and at the Ballermann in Mallorca. His mother died in 2011. He was on many TV-shows like Promi-Frauentausch or Mitten im Leben. At 2010 his first PC-Game Schäfer Heinrichs Bauernhof-Simulator was released. At 2018 his first movie Schäfer Heinrich - Der Film will be released.

== Discography ==
=== Singles ===
- 2008: "Das Schäferlied"
- 2009: Schäfchen zählen
- 2010: Schatzi, ich schubs Dich heute ins Heu
- 2011: Das schöne Mädchen von Seite 1
- 2012: Ich bin scha(r)f auf dich
- 2012: Für Gaby tu’ ich alles
- 2012: Im Traktor vor mir
- 2013: Millionen Frauen lieben mich
- 2014: Alle Schafe sind schon da
- 2015: Schäfer Heinrich hat ne Farm
- 2016: Für Schafe tu’ ich alles
- 2017: Ladykiller

== Awards ==
- 2015: Ballermann-Award at the categorie „Ballermann Award der Jury für Kultstatus“
- 2016: Ballermann-Award
