= Daniel Henrich =

German footballer

Personal information
- Date of birth: 29 September 1991 (age 35)
- Place of birth: Frankfurt, Germany
- Height: 1.73 m (5 ft 8 in)
- Position: Defensive midfielder

Team information
- Current team: Türk Gücü Friedberg
- Number: 6

Youth career
- EFC Kronberg
- –2005: 1. FC Eschborn
- 2005–2010: Kickers Offenbach

Senior career*
Years	Team	Apps	(Gls)
2010–2013	Kickers Offenbach II	56	(2)
2010–2011	→ Kickers Offenbach	9	(0)
2013–2014	FSV Frankfurt II	31	(0)
2014–2016	1. FC Eschborn	43	(1)
2015	→ 1. FC Eschborn II	4	(2)
2016–2019	Hessen Dreieich	85	(1)
2019–2021	FC Eddersheim	19	(1)
2021–	Türk Gücü Friedberg	51	(3)
- * Club domestic league appearances and goals as of 16 February 2021

Daniel Henrich (born 29 September 1991) is a German footballer who plays for Türk Gücü Friedberg in the Hessenliga.
