= Hinnerk Scheper =

German painter (1897–1957)

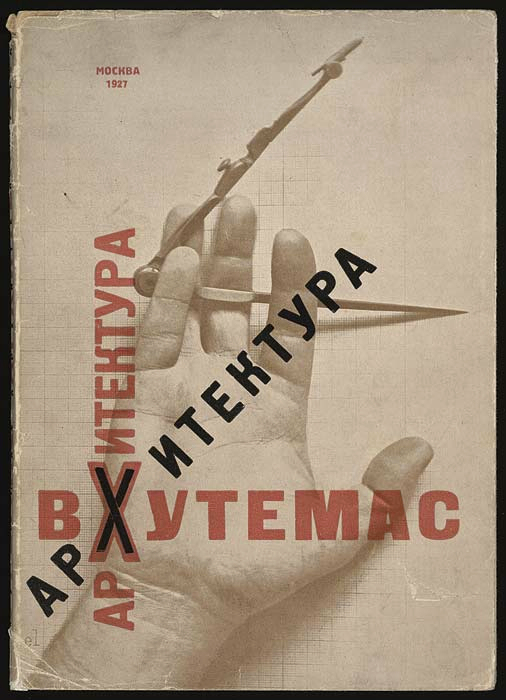
- Book cover for a publication by the Vkhutemas by El Lissitzky
- Born: Gerhard Hermann Heinrich; September 6, 1897; Wulften (Badbergen), Germany
- Died: February 5, 1957 (aged 59); Berlin, Germany
- Resting place: Waldfriedhof Zehlendorf
- Spouse: Lou Scheper-Berkenkamp

Hinnerk Scheper (born 6 September 1897 in Wulften (Badbergen); district of Bersenbrück/Osnabrück, as Gerhard Hermann Heinrich Scheper; died 5 February 1957 in Berlin) was a German colour designer, mural painter, architectural colorist, non-fiction author, photographer, monument conservator, restorer, state curator, and urban planner.

== Life ==
Color Wheel according to Johannes Itten (1961) Lehrer von Hinnerk Scheper.

Gerhard Hermann Heinrich was born on 6 September 1897 as son of Catherine Düne and stepfather master carpenter Hermann Gerhard Heinrich Scheper. His older brother was Hermann Scheper, who was born on 3 April 1842.

At the age of 7 Hinnerk was enrolled in the Protestant Volksschule in Wulften in 1904. After finishing school in 1912, he began an apprenticeship as a painter with Gustav Nehmelmann. With the simultaneous attendance of a further education school in nearby Osnabrück, Hinnerk expanded his knowledge in the subjects drawing and mathematics. In 1915, after successful completion of his journeyman's examination, he found his first job in Quakenbrück with painter Rudolf Engel and in 1916 he worked in the post office in Badbergen, as his master received a military service obligation to a shipyard in Bremen. In the preceding period Hinnerk managed to sell two of his paintings he had painted himself and used the money to buy his first camera. He developed the photos in his self built darkroom.

== The time at the Bauhaus ==
From 1918 to 1919 he attended the School of Arts and Crafts (majoring in photography) in Düsseldorf and Bremen. From 1919 to 1922 he studied at the Bauhaus in Weimar in the preliminary course of Johannes Itten and Paul Klee as well as mural painting with Itten and Oskar Schlemmer. Hinnerk Scheper passed his master examination as a painter. In the same year he married his fellow student Lou Berkenkamp. From 1922 to 1925 Scheper worked as a mural painter and colour designer, also for buildings in Weimar and Münster. From 1925, Scheper headed the workshop for mural painting at the Bauhaus in Dessau, succeeding Wassily Kandinsky, until the final closure of the Bauhaus by the National Socialists in 1933.

=== The “Bauhaus Wallpaper” ===
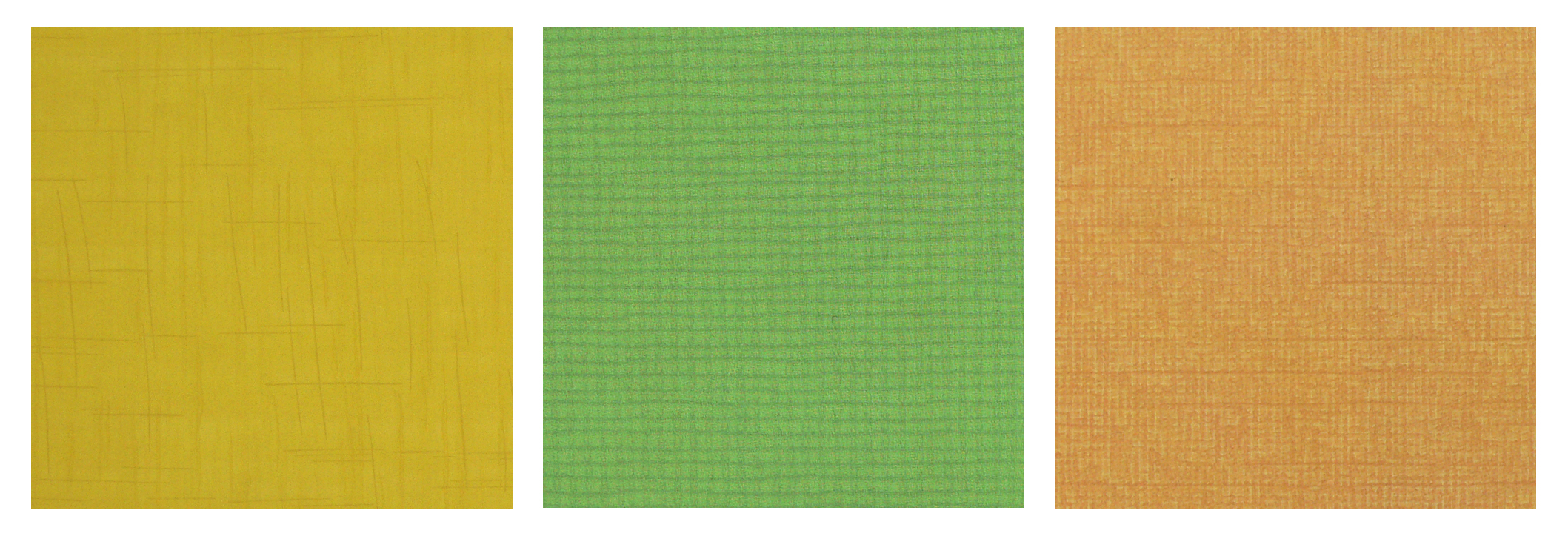
Three patterns of the Bauhaus Wallpaper, Bauhaus exhibition Niedersächsischer Landtag

Under the leadership of director Hannes Meyer, who succeeded Walter Gropius on 1 April 1928, a group was appointed to develop designs for the Bauhaus Wallpaper Collection; they were Hinnerk Scheper, Ludwig Hilberseimer, Josef Albers and Joost Schmidt. Hinnerk organized a design competition for the wallpaper patterns among his students in the mural painting workshop. Through Maria Rasch, sister of Emil Rasch, co-owner of the wallpaper factory Tapetenfabrik Gebr. Rasch in Bramsche, the production of the Bauhaus patterns was stimulated. The collection comprised 14 patterns, each with 5 to 15 colour variations, each with a structured, small-scale design that could be processed free of waste. After initial difficulties, the wallpaper became a complete economic success and through constant modernisation, the patterns also outlasted the Bauhaus closure up to today's Rasch range.

"It gave us the opportunity to transfer a peculiar colour and a texture of the tinted surface that we developed from the plaster to the paper. In this way we were able to generalise and popularise our type of wall treatment and also our principle of interior design by means of mechanical reproduction to an industrial product that is accessible to all."

— Hinnerk Scheper Review 1955

== The Time in Moscow ==
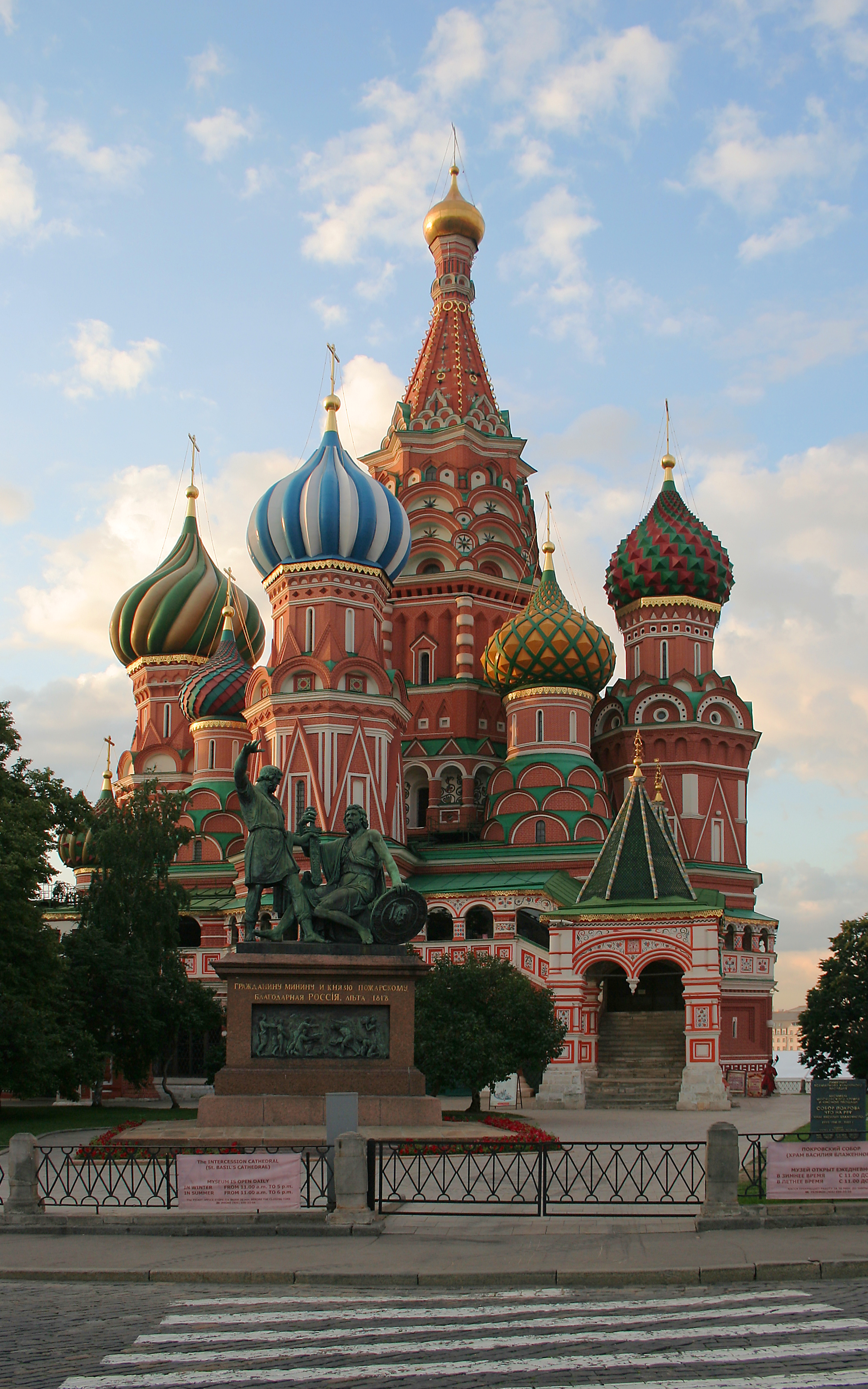
Basil-cathedral-morning

From 1929 to 1931, Scheper was on leave from the Bauhaus to work in Moscow, the Soviet Union capital to set up and manage a state consulting centre for colour design with associated teaching activities for the entire Soviet Union. Mrs Lou accompanied him to Moscow and supported him during this time. In addition, Scheper taught at the School of Design Vkhutemas. At the same time he created photo series about people and architecture in the Soviet Union. His Russian colleague in the "Advisory Centre for Colour in Architecture and Cityscape" (Russian Maljarstroj) became Boris Vladimirovich Ender, a student of Mikhail Matyushin. 1930 Erich Borchert followed his teacher and took over the leadership in the planning office Maljarstrojprojekt in 1931, as Hinnerk returned to Germany.

== The Time of National Socialism ==
Together with his wife Scheper worked for various photo agencies in Berlin until 1932. After 1934 he was engaged in freelance artistic work, colour design and restoration work. In 1934 the National Socialists refused Hinnerk the membership in the "Reichsverband der Deutschen Presse" (Association of the German Press). From 1942 to 1945 Scheper did military service in Germany.

=== After World War II ===
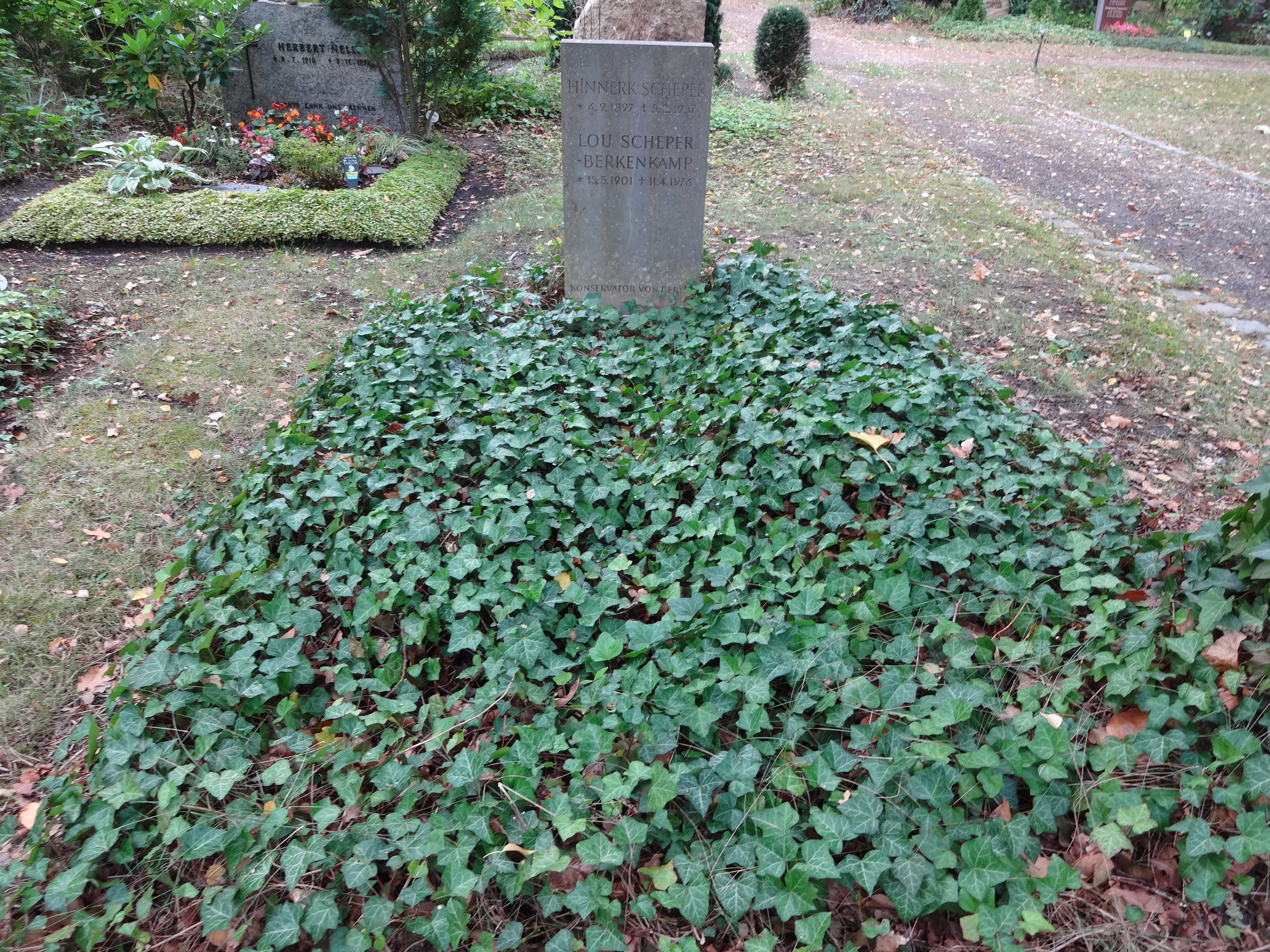
Forest Cemetery Zehlendorfer Hinnerk und Lou Scheper

In 1945, the Berlin magistrate appointed him head of the Office for the Preservation of Monuments and Urban Planning and as State Conservator of Berlin. In the same year, he was one of the rescuers of the Neue Wache in Berlin, as was the architect and curator of monuments Selman Selmanagić in 1949.

"p. 427

L II. The New Guardhouse
The New Guardhouse was built by Schinkel in 1818 as the first building in the new classical style in Berlin. The ten Victorias in the frieze on the entablature were modelled by Johann Gottfried Schadow "with care" according to Schinkel's designs and cast in lead. The flanking monuments by Friedrich Wilhelm Freiherr von Bülow and Gerhard von Scharnhorst, which Schinkel had also designed, were executed by Rauch. Schinkel had designed the figures for the gable field; however, the relief was not modeled in an altered form and cast in zinc until 1842 by Kiss. In 1930, the guardrooms inside the Neue Wache were removed, and the New Guardhousewas converted by Tessonow into the Reich Memorial and handed over by the Reichswehr to the care of the Prussian Ministry of Finance. The silver oak wreath was designed by Professor Ludwig Gies and executed by him and his students. During the war, the New Guardhouse burnt out and two columns of the portico collapsed. The wreath was stolen at the end of the war. As late as 1945, a Russian officer went to the palace to see the monument conservator Professor Scheper and asked Scheper whether he could start the restoration within 24 hours, because he had been commissioned to blow up the New Guardhouse, but if the restoration had begun, the blasting could be avoided.
p. 427/2
Scheper succeeded in procuring and erecting scaffolding and replacing a column in brick masonry. When the second column was half bricked up, a Russian order came to stop the restoration. However, the New Guardhouse was saved thanks to the private initiative of the Russian officer. After the splitting of the magistrate in 1948, the New Guardhouse was a thorn in the side of the Communists because of its final purpose as a memorial. Countless proposals were made to either remove the Neue Wache completely or to reuse it for a new purpose: as a public restroom, bookstore, anti-war memorial, memorial for the Victims of fascism, Goethe memorial. Other circles, e.g. the Freie Deutsche Jugend (FDJ) and head of the Amt Museen, Dr. Behrsing, were in favor of the complete demolition. On January 24, 1949, Behrsing wrote to City Councilor Kreuziger, among others: "It seems to me absolutely necessary that the problem of fate of the New Guardhouse Unter den Linden, which had remained unsolved under the old magistrate, be urgently resolved under the present changed circumstances. The Social Democratic magistrate has done nothing further in this matter, just as he treated all questions related to the preservation of historical monuments from an aesthetic point of view at best. Moreover, the existence of a memorial cultivated by the Nazis directly in front of the House of Culture of the Soviet Union is an impossibility". The Freie Deutsche Jugend (FDJ) wrote in its declaration of February 10, 1949, signed by Peter Frey: "We also feel it would be better spatially if the ruins of the memorial were to disappear as quickly as possible. We would therefore support its removal from both a political and cultural point of view.
p. 428
The Free German Federation of Trade Unions wrote on March 2, 1949: "Concerns memorial Unter den Linden. Dear Comrade Dr. Bersing! I announce the opinion of the central cultural commission of the FDGB Groß-Berlin on the question, which dealt with it in detail at its last meeting on March 1, 1949. Its decision does not represent an official expression of opinion by the board of the FDGB Groß-Berlin, since the Cultural Commission is merely an advisory body of the Cultural Department. However, an official statement on this question would probably not be otherwise. The demolition of the Schinkel Building is not approved under any circumstances. For this, it is proposed: removal of the stone and conversion into a Goethe memorial. This proposal was accepted by 43 votes to 6.
Reason had triumphed.

In the following period, the front of the New Guardhouse was used to put up political posters. On 12.04.1950 the front half of the gable collapsed. The figures of the gable relief by Kiss were completely smashed in half, several of the Schadow Victoria by the Architrav were severely damaged. On the same day, for a single political celebration, a gallery was built across the "Linden" for the New Guardhouse in which 50 cubic meters of beams were used. The collapse could have been prevented with a single beam.

p. 429
Tragically, the collapse occurred almost simultaneously with the approval of the building funds for the restoration of the Neue Wache's exterior. After the collapse, the Department of Repatriation at the Amt Museen recovered the three fallen Viktorien and parts of the gable relief and brought them to the National Gallery. Later, the remaining seven Victoria sculptures and the second half of the gable were removed and stored in the National Gallery. In 1957 the gable relief was given to the Lauchhammerhütte for restoration. The Viktorien were also restored. The New Guardhouse was restored in the form it had after the reconstruction of Heinrich Tessenow, naturally without the wreath. Today it serves as a memorial for the victims of militarism and fascism".

— Kurt Reutti: Memories of Kurt Reutti (1900-1967), a German sculptor and art collector Volume 2 (Title VI. HA. NI Reutti. K.. No. 2: Kurt Reutti. GStA PK, VI. HA, Nl Reutti, K. Memories. Vol. 2 p. 252-496 on Secret State Archive Prussian Cultural Heritage)

During the division of Berlin, Scheper protested unsuccessfully against the eviction of the Berlin City Palacees by the Volkspolizei in October 1948. The hopeless struggle against the demolition of the palace, which was being pursued by the East Berlin magistrate, caused him and the director of the Berlin Palace Department, Margarete Kühn (art historian) to move their offices to West Berlin. In 1951, Hinnerk attracted attention as an expert witness in an expert commission consisting of Professor Richard Sedlmaier from Kiel, Professor Günther Grundmann and Dr. jur. Günter Scheefe from Hamburg. The commission unmasked the forgeries in the Marienkirche of Lübeck. After the war, the "Bauhaus Wallpaper Collection" was relaunched in 1950/51, still in the same design of the 1930s. Hinnerk, like in the period up to the beginning of the war, remained responsible for its colour scheme. From 1952/53 the Rasch company modernised the collection and oriented itself towards Scandinavian designs. From 1952 Scheper held a teaching position for the preservation of historical monuments at Technische Universität Berlin and from 1953 he held the title of Government Director.

Hinnerk Scheper died on May 5, 1957, in Berlin. The couple's grave is in the forest cemetery Zehlendorf.

== Family ==
On December 22, 1922, he married his wife Lou, née Hermine Luise Berkenkamp in the city church St. Peter and Paul in Weimar.

The following children resulted from the marriage:

- Jan Gisbert (* November 7, 1923)
- Britta (* 28 March 1926; † 14 January 2012)
- Dirk (* August 21, 1938)

His daughter-in-law became the wife of son Dirk, Renate Scheper.

== Works ==
Highlights in Scheper's work in Dessau were his colour design and the colour coding system in the Bauhaus building/Dessau and the colour design of the masters' houses as well as that of the Dessau Törten settlement. Among his most important colour designs in Moscow was the Einküchenhaus#Moscow 1928]-Narkomfin building by Ginsburg and Milinis. Scheper carried out restoration measures at the Sacrow Castle, Kammergericht, the Reich Forestry Office and Prinz-Albrecht-Palais in Berlin. "The reconstruction of Berlin, in particular the rescue and restoration of historical buildings, churches and palaces, remains closely associated with the name Hinnerk Scheper."

- 1926 Design of the exhibition rooms in the galerie Neue Kunst Fides in Dresden, for the exhibition by Paul Klee in June of the year.
- Design planning for a colour coding system in the Weimar Castle Museum
- Colour design for functional areas in the Folkwang Museum, Essen
- 1945 Neue Wache in Berlin, rescued by starting restoration against Soviet demolition plans.
- From 1945 reconstruction of Schloss Charlottenburg, especially the built parts of Eosander from Göthe (1669 – 1728)
- 1946 Hinnerk Scheper has the equestrian statue of Friedrich Wilhelm I sunk in the Borsighafen Berlin Tegel. The sensational recovery followed in 1948 and, after restoration in 1951, it was repositioned, but no longer in its original place on the Kurfürstenbrücke, but in the Ehrenhof of Charlottenburg Palace. For the Senate in West Berlin, a transfer to the original location in East Berlin was out of the question, since by decision of the state leadership of the German Democratic Republic (GDR) the baroque Berlin Castle, in sight of the bridge, was simply blown up in September 1950
- 1949 - 1955 Head of the restoration of the staircase in Schloss Glienicke and of Knobelsdorff wing at Charlottenburg Palace and with restorer Erich Demmin
- 1950-56 Reconstruction of the Luisenkirche (Berlin-Charlottenburg)
- 1951 Statement against the art forger Lothar Malskat with his forgery in the St. Mary's Church, Lübeck. Sentencing of Malskat on January 25, 1955.
- 1952-1957 Restoration of the Johanniskirche (Berlin), under the direction of the architects Otto Bartning and Professor Werry Roth (1885-1958) in the sense of Schinkels
- 1954 City curator Hinnerk has the figures of the Siegesallee buried in the park of the Schloss Bellevue under the strictest secrecy to protect them from the Allies and Communists. The Berliners called the Siegesallee their "doll's alley". With the consent of the Federal President of that time] Walter Scheel the figures were not excavated again until 1979 in the course of the action "Save the monuments"
- Commitment to the preservation and careful reconstruction of the baroque Kammergericht's Berlin built (built 1734/1735)
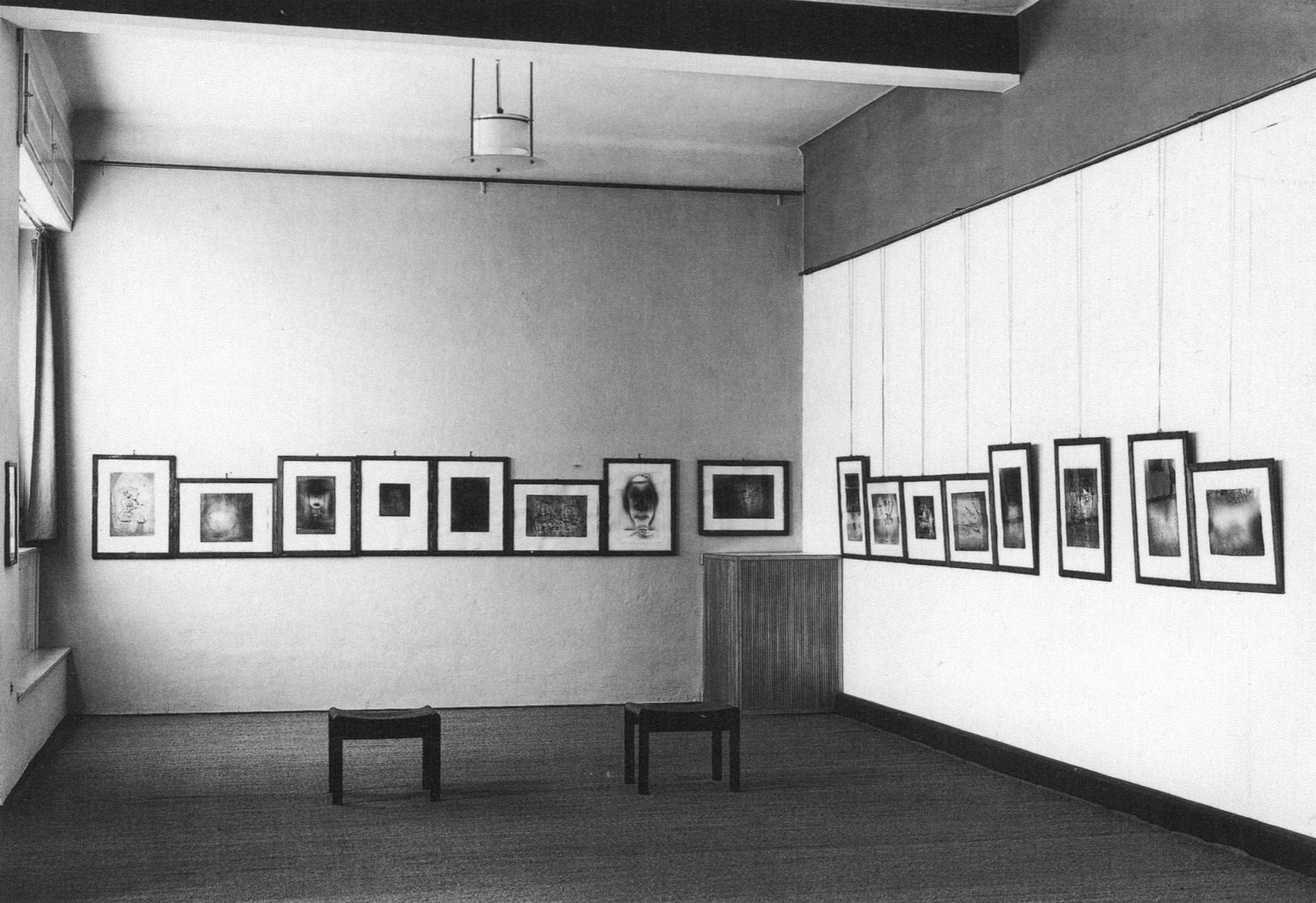
Gallery New Art Fides 1926

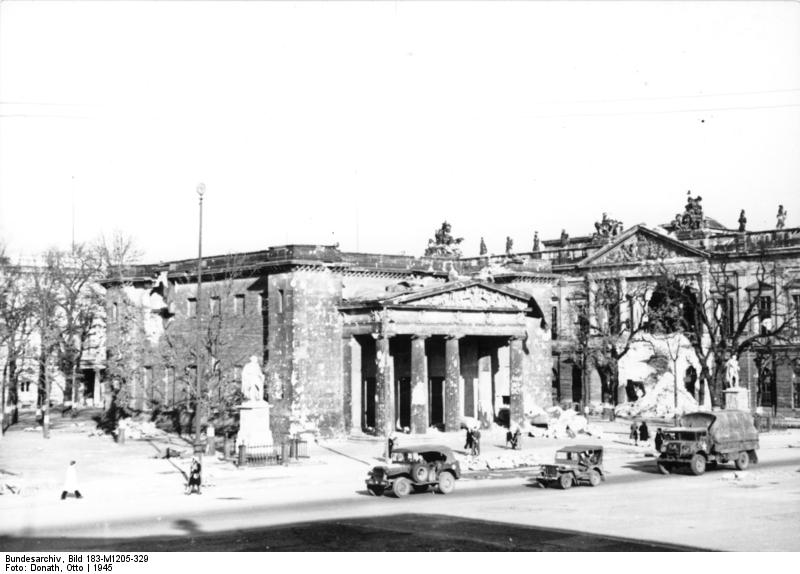
View of the Neue Wache (New guardhouse) after its destruction in World War II

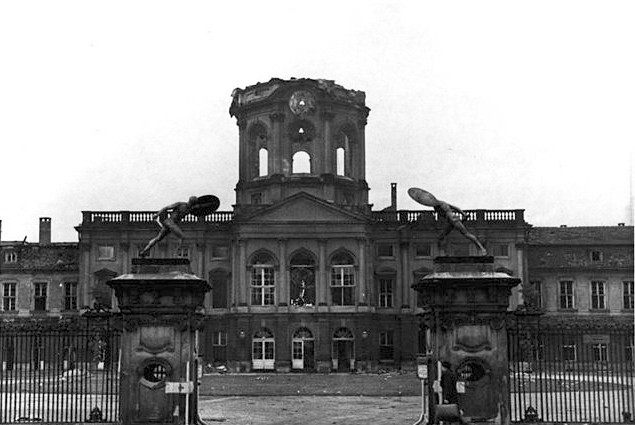
Charlottenburg Palace after the air raid of 22 November 1943

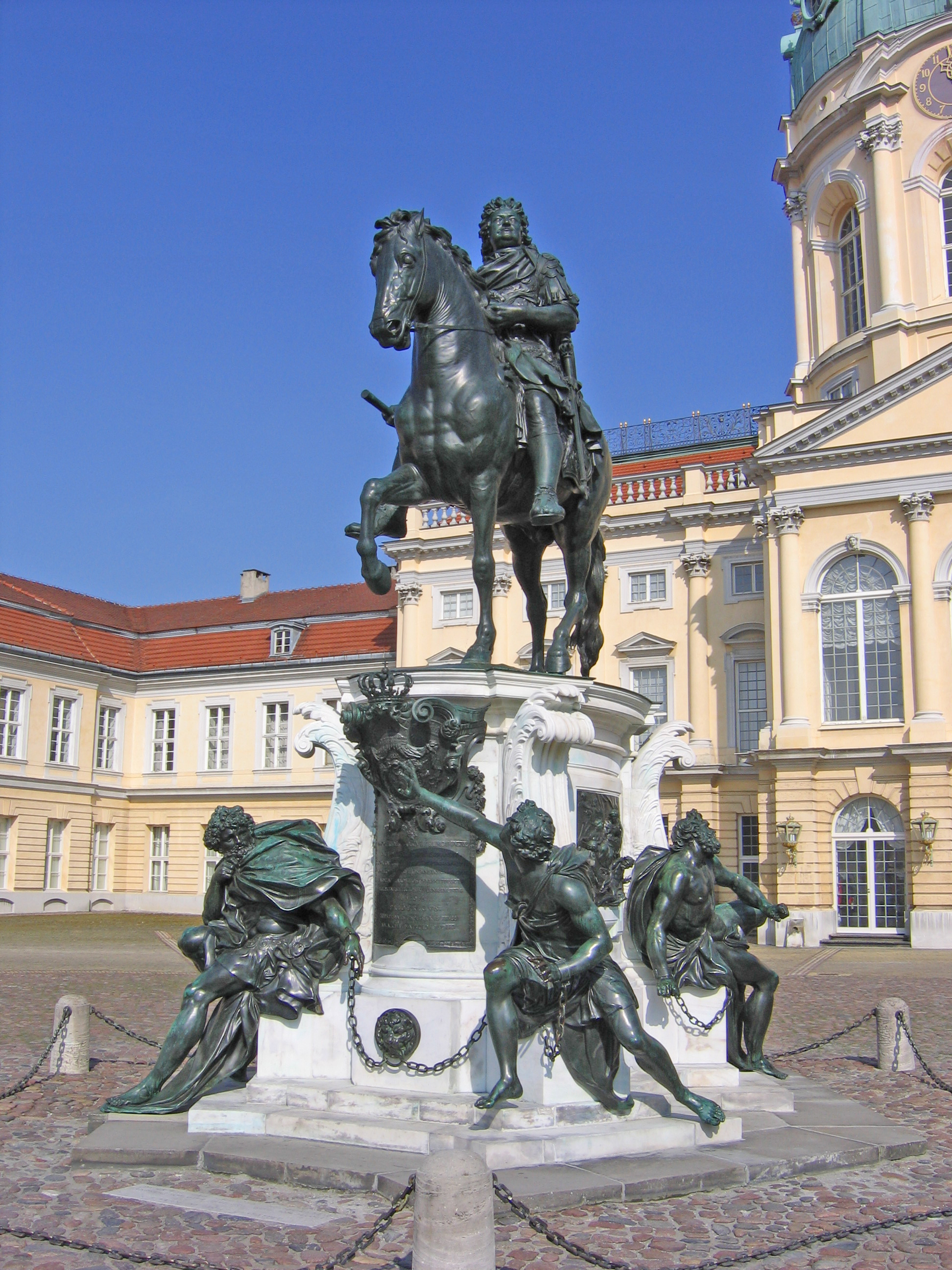
Equestrian statue of the Great Elector in the Cour d'honneur of Charlottenburg Palace Berlin

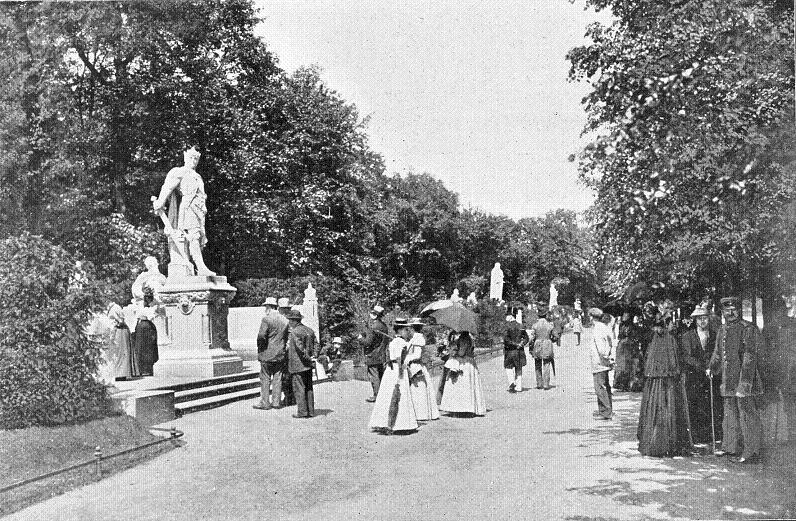
Victory Alley Berlin 1903, called "doll's Avenue" by the Berliners

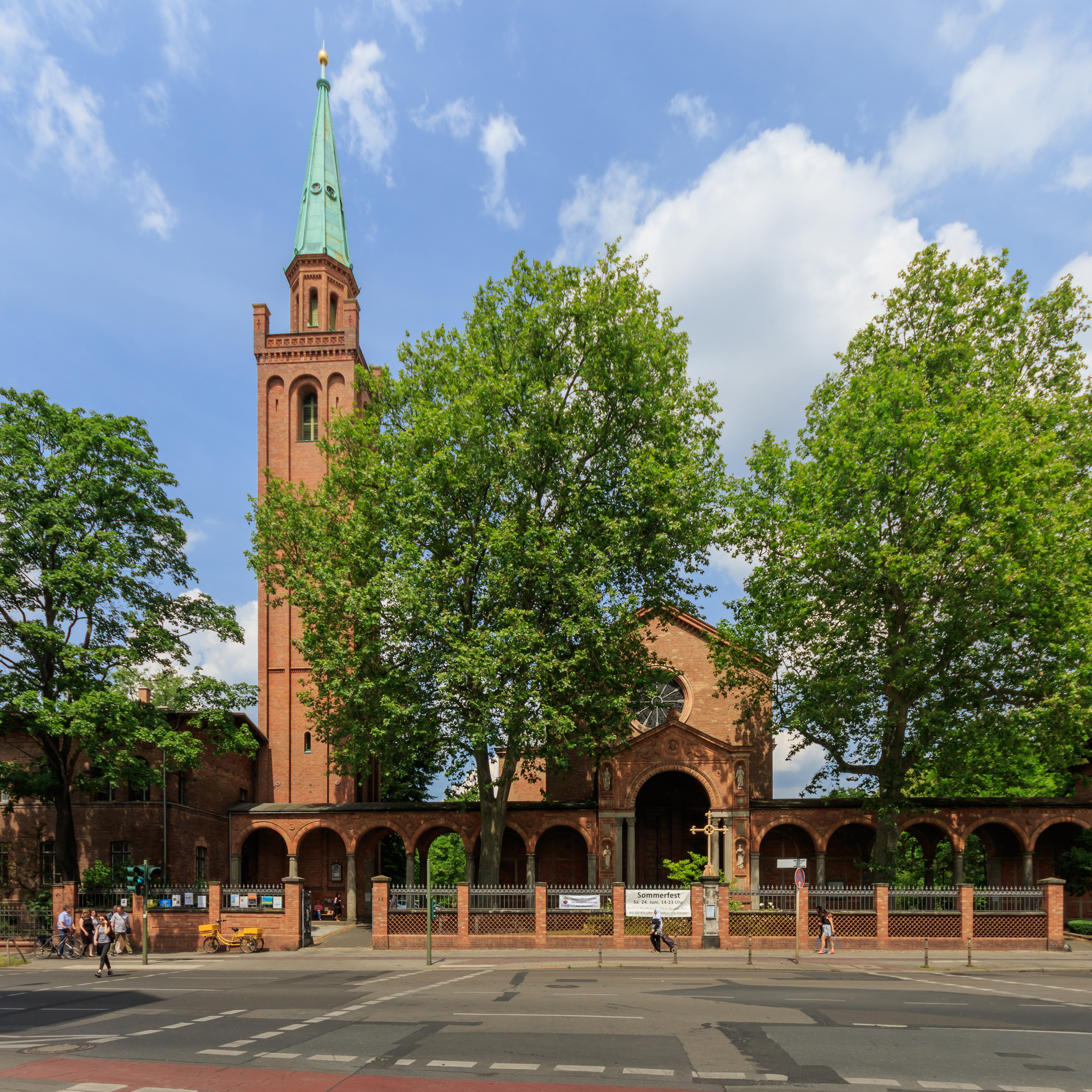
Johanniskirche in Berlin-Moabit (2017)

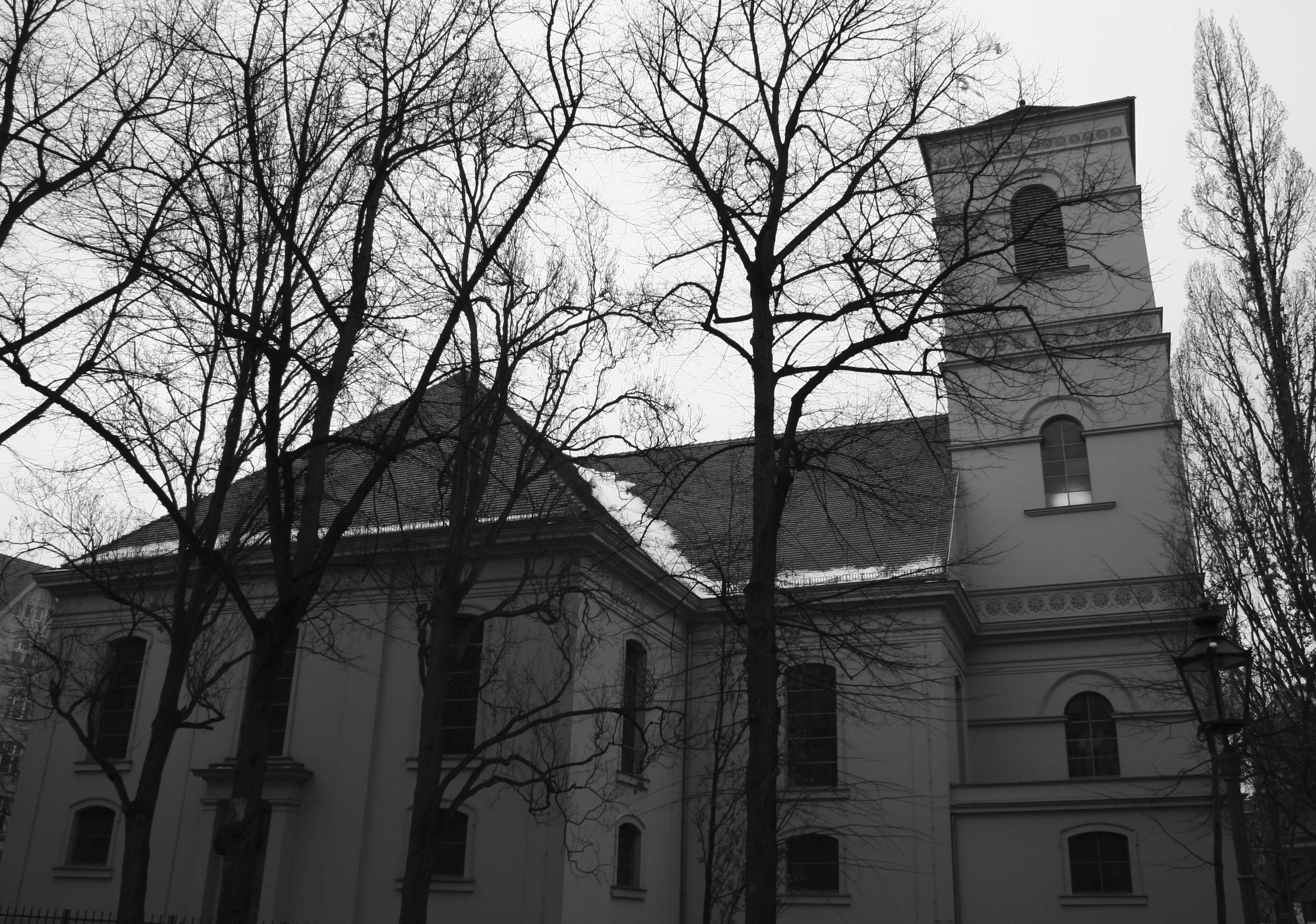
The Luisenkirche in Berlin Charlottenburg

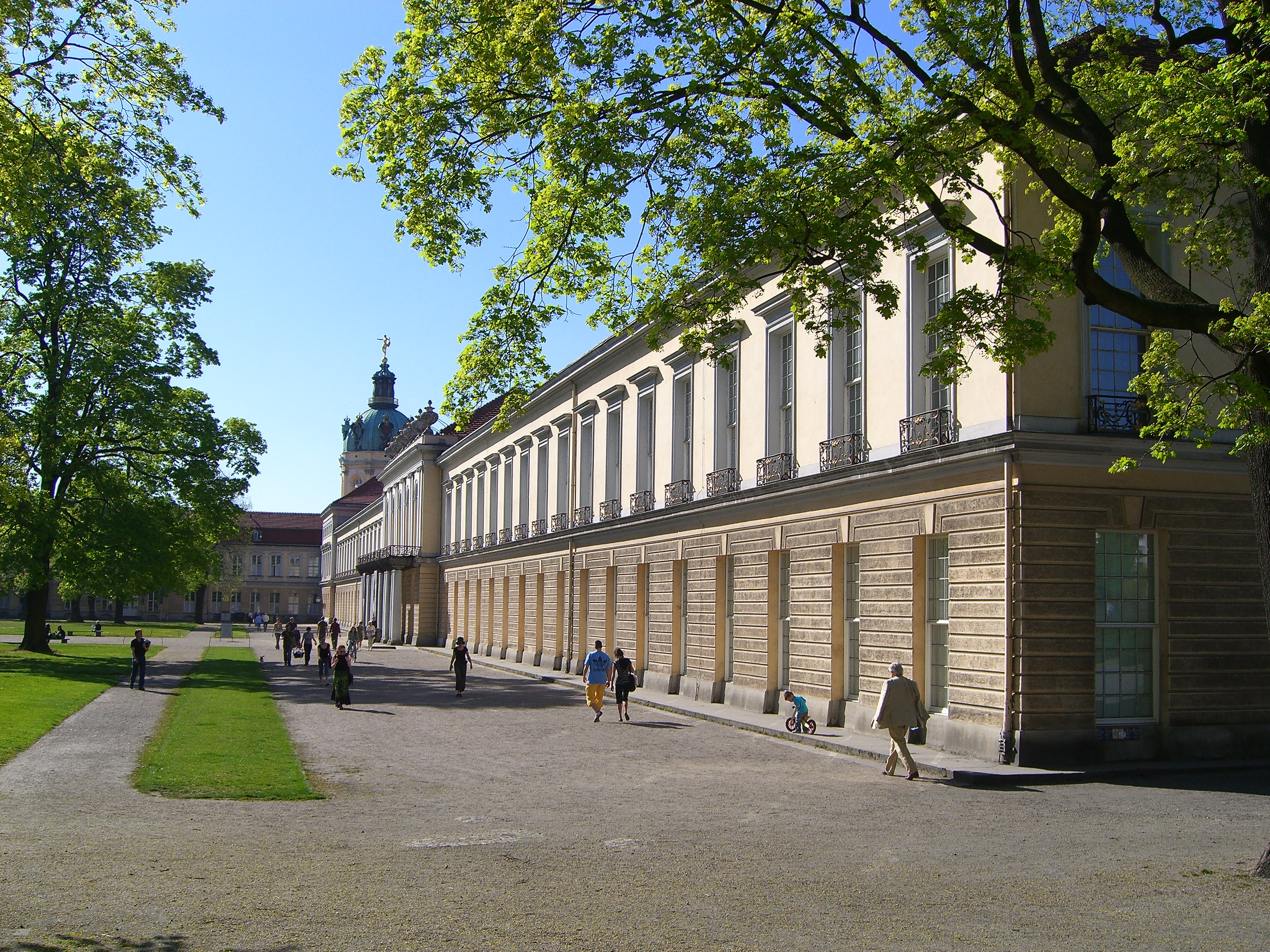
Schloss Charlottenburg: Knobelsdorff-Flügel (new wing)

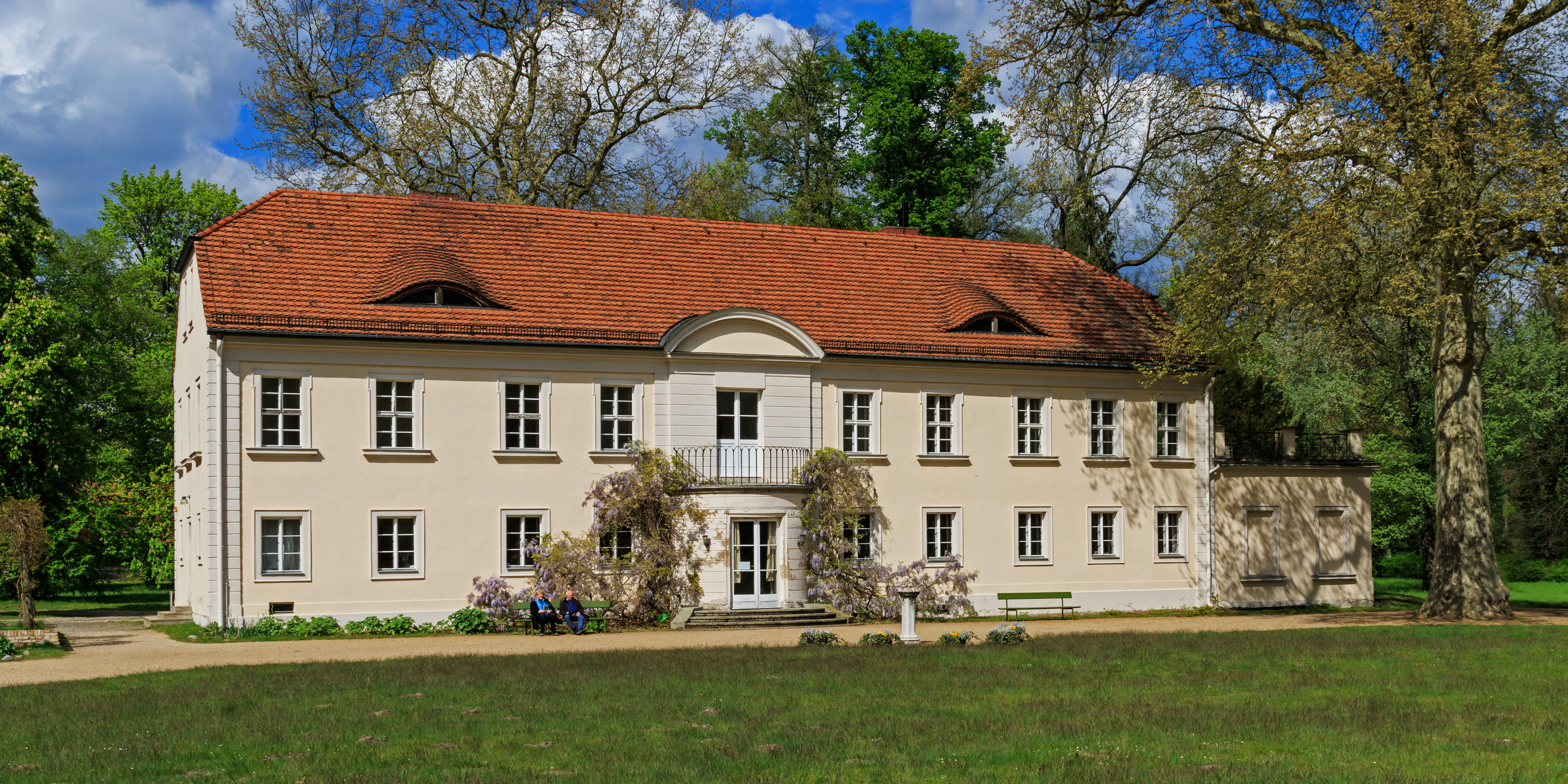
Sacrow Castle, Spring 2015

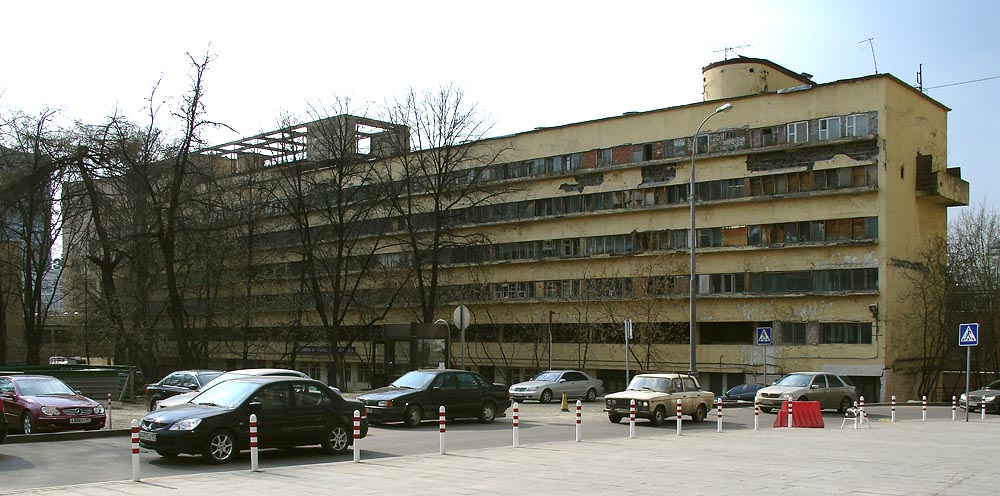
Narkomfin Building, Moscow 2007

== Own literary works - non-fiction ==
- Restaurieren und Berufsethos - (Article) Author: Hinnerk Scheper (Source: Deutsche Kunst und Denkmalpflege / hrsg. by d. Vereinigung der Landesdenkmalpfleger in der Bundesrepublik Deutschland. 1955, 109-111 Publisher: 1955).
- The Buildings and Art Monuments of Berlin, Tiergarten District - Author: Hinnerk Scheper Publisher: Berlin : Gebr. Mann Verlag, 1955. (Synagogue architecture. Synagogue architecture. - Germany - Berlin. Synagogues.)
- The buildings and art monuments of Berlin - Author: Hinnerk Scheper; Paul Ortwin Rave - Publisher: Berlin Gebr. Mann
- The Buildings and Art Monuments of Berlin - Im Auftr. d. Senats v. Berlin ed. by Hinnerk Scheper. Writer: Paul Ortwin Rave. From 3:] Im Auftr. d. Senators f. Bau- u. Wohnungswesen published by the Berlin State Conservator [sp.:] Amt. f. Preservation of Monuments. Author: Hinnerk Scheper Publisher: Berlin Gebr. Mann 1955.
- The buildings and art monuments of Berlin - Author: Hinnerk Scheper; Irmgard Wirth; Berlin (West). Senate. Publisher: Berlin : Mann, 1955 (introduced by Paul Ortwin Rave / commissioned by the Senate Berlin-West. Ed. by Hinnerk Scheper. edited by Irmgard Wirth.
- Die Bauwerke und Kunstdenkmäler von Berlin - magazine, magazine: Serien Verlag: Berlin Gebr. Mann
- Scheper, Hinnerk, 1897-1957. artist file - Author: Hinnerk Scheper; Ingalls Library, (Manuscript material, Archival materials)
- Ten years of monument preservation in Berlin (article) - Author: Hinnerk Scheper (Source: Deutsche Kunst und Denkmalpflege / ed. by d. Vereinigung der Landesdenkmalpfleger in der Bundesrepublik Deutschland. 1957, 56-60 Publisher: 1957)
- Tafelband - Author: Paul Ortwin Rave; Hinnerk Scheper; Irmgard Wirth Verlag: Berlin : Gebr. Mann Verlag, 1961. (Charlottenburg, T. 2.; City and District of Charlottenburg / Writings and Insert: Paul Ortwin Rave. Edited by Irmgard Wirth, Tafelbd.; Buildings and Art Monuments of Berlin / ed. by the Senator for Urban Development and Environmental Protection, Landeskonservator, 2nd ed.)
- The Buildings and Monuments of Art of Berlin. 2], Charlottenburg - Author: Hinnerk Scheper; Berlin (West). Office for preservation of monuments.
- The buildings and art monuments of Berlin. [2] City and district of Charlottenburg : Tafelbd. - Author: Hinnerk Scheper Publisher: Berlin Mann 1961
- Text volume - Author: Margarete Kühn (art historian); Paul Ortwin Rave; Hinnerk Scheper Verlag: Berlin : Gebr. Mann Verlag, 1970 (Charlottenburg, T. 1.; Schloß Charlottenburg / edited by Margarete Kühn, text ibid.; Bauwerke und Kunstdenkmäler von Berlin / ed. by the Senator für Stadtentwicklung und Umweltschutz, Landeskonservator, 2nd ed.)
- The Buildings and Monuments of Art of Berlin. 3], District Kreuzberg - Author: Hinnerk Scheper; Berlin (West). Office for Monument Preservation. Publisher: Berlin Mann
- The buildings and art monuments of Berlin. 4] Kreuzberg District : Maps and Plans - Author: Hinnerk Scheper Publisher: Berlin Mann 1980
- The Kaiser Wilhelm Memorial Church : Origin and Significance - Author: Vera Frowein-Ziroff; Paul Ortwin Rave; Hinnerk Scheper Verlag: Berlin : Gebr. Mann Verlag, 1982 (Buildings and Art Monuments of Berlin / ed. by the Senator for Urban Development and Environmental Protection, State Conservator, Beih. 9.)
- Photo: Hinnerk Scheper : a Bauhäusler as photo journalist in Dessau (exhibition catalogue) - Author: Renate Scheper; Hinnerk Scheper Verlag: Dessau: Anhaltische Verl.-Ges., 1991.(Contributions to the city history, 13th; Scheper, Hinnerk. Photography. Dessau 1991)
- Maps and plans - author: Manfred Hecker; Paul Ortwin Rave; Hinnerk Scheper (handwritten material, archival materials) Kreuzberg district / edited by Manfred Hecker, 4,1; Buildings and art monuments of Berlin / edited by the Senator for Urban Development and Environmental Protection, State Curator, 4th ed.)
- Hinnerk Scheper : colour designer, photographer, monument conservator influenced by the Bauhaus - Author: Hinnerk Scheper; Renate Scheper; Förderverein Meisterhäuser Dessau Verlag: Bramsche : Rasch, 2007 (Catalogue book for the exhibition in the Muche Masters' House in Dessau from 5 October to 25 November 2007, organised by the Förderverein Meisterhäuser Dessau e.V. with the support of the city of Dessau-Rosslau; from 7 March to 18 May 2008, the exhibition will also be shown by the Förderkreis der Bauhaus-Universität Weimar e.V. in the Haus am Horn in Weimar)

== Literature ==
- Renate Scheper: "Photo: Hinnerk Scheper. A Bauhäusler as a photo journalist in Dessau." Anhaltische Verlags-Gesellschaft, Dessau 1991, ISBN 3-910192-11-4.
- Renate Scheper (Ed.): Hinnerk Scheper: Colour designer, photographer, monument conservator influenced by the Bauhaus. Rasch, Bramsche 2007, ISBN 978-3-89946-093-3.
