= Mitten im Leben (TV series) =

- Country of origin: Germany

Mitten im Leben is a German pseudo-documentary drama-reality television series.

== See also ==
- List of German television series
