= Heinrichs =

Heinrichs is a surname derived from Heinrich. Notable people with this name include:

- April Heinrichs (born 1964), American soccer player
- Conrad-Oskar Heinrichs (1890–1944), German General during World War II
- Dolph Heinrichs (1883–1967), Australian sportsman
- Erik Heinrichs (1890–1965), Finnish general
- Jason Heinrichs (born 1970), Canadian musical producer
- Josh Heinrichs (born 1981), American singer/musician
- Leo Heinrichs (1867–1908), a German-born Roman Catholic priest
- Rick Heinrichs, American film production designer
- Wolfhart Heinrichs (1941–2014), German Arabist

== See also ==
- Heinrich (disambiguation)
