= Enrique =

- Gender: Male

Origin
- Origin: Germanic (German)

Other names
- Variant form: Enriquez
- Related names: Henry, Harry

Enrique (Spanish pronunciation: [enˈrike]) is the Spanish variant of the given name Heinrich of Germanic origin.

Equivalents in other languages are Henry (English), Enric (Catalan), Enrico (Italian), Henrik (Swedish, Danish, and Norwegian), Heinrich (German), Hendrik, Henk (Dutch), Henri (French), and Henrique (Portuguese). Common nicknames of Enrique are Kiki, Kiko, Kike, Rick, Ricky, and Quique.

Enrique is also a surname. A variant surname is Enriquez (son of Enrique).

Notable people with the name include:

== Given name ==
- Enrique of Malacca (fl. 1511–1521), Malay slave who may have been the first person to travel around the world
- Enrique Aguilar (footballer) (born 2007), Swiss footballer
- Enrique Aguirre (born 1979), Argentine athlete
- Enrique Álvarez Félix (1934–1996), Mexican actor
- Enrique Bacigalupo (1938–2026), Argentine and Spanish judge and lawyer
- Enrique Bátiz (1942–2025), Mexican conductor and concert pianist
- Enrique Bolaños (1928–2021), President of Nicaragua from 2002 to 2007
- Enrique Bunbury (born 1967), Spanish singer and band member of Heroes Del Silencio
- Enrique Campos (born 1961), Venezuelan road bicycle racer
- Enrique Casaretto (1945–2020), Peruvian footballer
- Enrique Castillo (born 1949), American actor
- Enrique Collar (1934–2025), Spanish footballer
- Enrique Cruz Jr. (born 2003), American football player
- Enrique Escalante (born 1984), Puerto Rican volleyball player
- Enrique de la Fuente (born 1975), Spanish volleyball player
- Enrique Gay García (1928–2015), Cuban-born American painter, sculptor
- Enrique Gil (born 1992), Filipino actor, dancer, and commercial model
- Enrique Granados (1867–1916), Spanish pianist and classical composer
- Enrique Hermitte (1871–1955), Argentine geologist
- Enrique Hernández (baseball) (born 1991), Puerto Rican baseball player
- Enrique Iglesias (born 1975), Spanish singer, songwriter, record producer, philanthropist and actor
- Enrique V. Iglesias (born 1930), Uruguayan-Spanish economist
- Enrique Ika (c. 1859–after 1900), Rapa Nui leader
- Enrique Lores (born 1964/65), Spanish business executive, CEO of HP Inc
- Enrique Fernando Ortiz Moruno (born 1977), Spanish football player
- Enrique Maciel, Argentine composer and musician
- Enrique "Ricky" Martin (born 1971), Puerto Rican singer, songwriter, actor, author, record producer, and humanitarian
- Enrique Martín (disambiguation), several people
- Enrique López Pérez (born 1991), Spanish tennis player
- Enrique Peña Nieto (born 1966), 57th President of Mexico
- Enrique Jardiel Poncela (1901–1952), Spanish playwright
- Enrique van Rysselberghe Herrera (born 1976), Chilean politician
- Enrique Ruíz-Williams, Cuban exile
- Enrique Sabari (born 1965), Cuban weightlifter
- Enrique Santamarina (1870–1937), Argentine politician
- Enrique Tandeter (1944–2004), Argentine historian
- Enrique Fuentes Quintana (1924–2007), Spanish politician and economist
- Enrique González (disambiguation), several people
- Quique Sánchez Flores (born 1965), Spanish football coach
- Enrique Murciano (born 1973), Cuban-American actor (Without A Trace)
- Jorge Enrique Adoum (1926–2009), Ecuadorian writer
- Enrique Tucuna (born 1968), Uruguayan basketball player
- Enrique Vera Ibáñez (born 1954), Mexican/Swedish race walker
- Enrique Vicente Hernández (born 1945), Spanish football player
- Enrique Yáñez (1908–1990), Mexican architect
- Enrique Zóbel de Ayala (1877–1943), Spanish Filipino businessman
- Enrique Zobel (1927–2004), Filipino businessman and polo player
- Enriquillo (fl. 16th cen.), Taino resistance leader also known as Enrique

== Surname ==
- Carlos Enrique (born 1963), Argentine footballer
- Fernando Enrique (canoeist) (born 1998), Cuban sprint canoeist
- Fernando Enrique (footballer) (born 1985), Argentine midfielder
- Héctor Enrique (born 1962), Argentine footballer
- José Enrique (disambiguation), several people
- Klaus Enrique (born 1975), Mexican-German sculptor and photographer
- Marcos Enrique (born 1999), Argentine footballer
- Ramiro Enrique (born 2001), Argentine footballer
- Roberto Enrique, American actor and singer-songwriter
- Sergi Enrique (born 1987), Spanish field hockey player

== See also ==
- List of storms named Enrique
- Luis Enrique (disambiguation)
- Henry (disambiguation)
- Henrike, a feminine given name
