= Nelida (disambiguation) =

Nélida is a novel by Marie d'Agoult.

Nelida may also refer to:

== Given name ==
- Nélida María Bacigalupo (1924–2019), Argentine botanist, curator, and professor
- Nélida Béjar (born 1979), Spanish composer based in Germany
- Nélida Bilbao (1918–1990), Argentine film actress
- Nelida Fuccaro, Italian historian and professor
- Nélida Fullone (1915–?), Argentine fencer
- Nélida Gómez de Navajas (1927–2012), Argentine human rights activist
- Nélida Lobato (1934–1982), Argentine dancer, vedette, model and actress
- Nelida Milani (born 1939), ethnic Italian writer from Croatia
- Nélida Piñon (born 1937), Brazilian author and professor
- Nélida Roca (1929–1999), Argentine actresses
- Nélida Romero (1926–2015), Argentine actress
- Nélida Sifuentes (born 1981), politician and union leader of the indigenous peasant movement in Bolivia
- Nélida Sulca (born 1987), Peruvian athlete
- Nelida Tirado (born 1971), American flamenco dancer
- Nélida Zaitegi (born 1946), Spanish teacher and pedagogue

== See also ==
- Atlantagrotis nelida, moth of the family Noctuidae
