= 3D Aerobatics =

3D Aerobatics or 3D flying is a form of flying using flying aircraft to perform specific aerial maneuvers. They are usually performed when the aircraft had been intentionally placed in a stalled position for purposes of entertainment or display. They are also often referred to as post-stall maneuvers, as they occur after aerodynamic stall has occurred and standard control surface deflections, as used in flight, are not effective.

3D Aerobatics are typically practiced in aircraft designed for supermaneuvrability, such as the Aviat Eagle, the Sukhoi Su-27 (Russian: Сухой Су-27; NATO reporting name: Flanker), or the Lockheed Martin F-22. Supermaneuverable aircraft typically include some feature that enables them to maintain stable control of the aircraft in situations where there is little to no airflow over control surfaces. Aircraft either achieve this through having designs that allow for high lift at low speeds, large control surface deflections, or thrust vectoring. The Aviat Eagle, after stalling, is able to gain some degree of control after just a few moments of falling to regain velocity, and is then able to resume regular flight. The F-22 Raptor uses its thrust vectoring to maneuver the aircraft with no dependence on airflow over its control surfaces, allowing it to perform acrobatics otherwise impossible for non-thrust vectoring aircraft. Aircraft not designed for post-stall maneuvers, such as the Cessna 172, would place themselves at high risk if attempting such maneuvers due to the likelihood of inducing flat spins, nosedives, or deep stalls, all situations which are nearly irrecoverable, especially at low altitudes.

3D Aerobatics in non-thrust vectoring aircraft are typically reserved for display purposes and hold little use in standard everyday flight. They have some usage in air combat, as the unpredictability of aircraft in post-stall situations allows for sudden maneuvers which may place friendly aircraft in advantageous situations. The Russian Su-27 Flanker can, in theory, lock an adversary with IRST and perform a cobra maneuver in which it suddenly pitches upwards but continues laterally, gaining 90 degrees or higher of AoA, and launches a heat-seeking missile. The missile is able to engage the enemy aircraft after it has overshot the Flanker, often without the adversary realizing a missile has been released. These types of situations are high risk and high reward, and often occur over an extremely short period of time, leading to them being referred to as 'snapshots'.

== Introduction ==
In its most basic sense, 3D flight is controlled flight beyond the stall's critical angle of attack (AoA, or alpha) a.k.a. post-stall. Because the model is stalled and has little natural airflow across its flight surfaces, most 3D maneuvers require very large control deflections to vector the propeller thrust and change the model's attitude.

3D aerobatic flying is a typically performed by model aircraft which have been configured with a higher thrust-to-weight ratio of more than 1:1. In fixed wing aeroplanes large control surfaces assist the aircraft on performing radical maneuvers which allow the aircraft to turn in tighter than conventional turns. This is achieved by having larger control surfaces; rudder, ailerons, and elevator and having greater amounts of throw applied to these control surfaces.

Depending on the type of competition, a pilot may compete in Set Manoeuvres where a pilot can choose from a number of manoeuvres from pre-published set of moves or Freestyle, where pilots must show their skill within a predetermined environment in a free format. The Extreme Flight Championships (XFC) is a large international freestyle competition.

Pilots often train moves using PC simulators such as RealFlight or other RC flight simulators. This allows the pilot to practice and hone their skills before using the real RC model which may be costly exercise in the event of a crash. Pilots have the ability to plug the controller used to fly the real model to the PC and simulator via a USB link cable thus giving the pilot a better response to the real world controls. Famous pilots include Quique Somenzini, Andrew Jesky, Jason Noll, Frank Noll, Chip Hyde, Mark Leseberg and Gernot Bruckmann.

Source: www.aircraft-hobby.com Source:

== Types of aircraft ==
=== Aeroplanes ===
There are a multitude of Hobby Grade Model Airframes that can perform 3D manoeuvres. Many of these models are designed after full scale airframes with slight modifications to accommodate thrust to weight ratios, control surface sizes. Some of the most popular scale models are below:

Extra Aircraft: Extra 260 Extra 300 Extra 330S

Zivko: Edge 540

Yakovlev (Also known as Yak): Yak-54 Yak-55

Sukhoi: Su-26 Su-29

Cap Aviation: CAP 230

AkroTechs Giles G-202

There are also custom made 3D capable aircraft that are not modeled after full scale aircraft.

For instance: Showtime 50, Showtime 4D, GP Reactor, Twist 40 and Twist 60 3D, Thunder 3D, Slick 580, and Laser.

Some of the popular aerobatic model manufacturers include Extreme Flight RC, 3D Hobby Shop, JTA Innovations, Flex Innovations, Composite ARF, Hangar 9, Krill, and others.

=== Helicopters ===
3D Helicopters are collective pitch and have very high head speeds and they range in size from a few inch blades to over 2 foot long blades. Some of the most popular sizes are 250, 300, 450, 500, 550, 600, 700.

== Aeroplane Manoeuvres ==
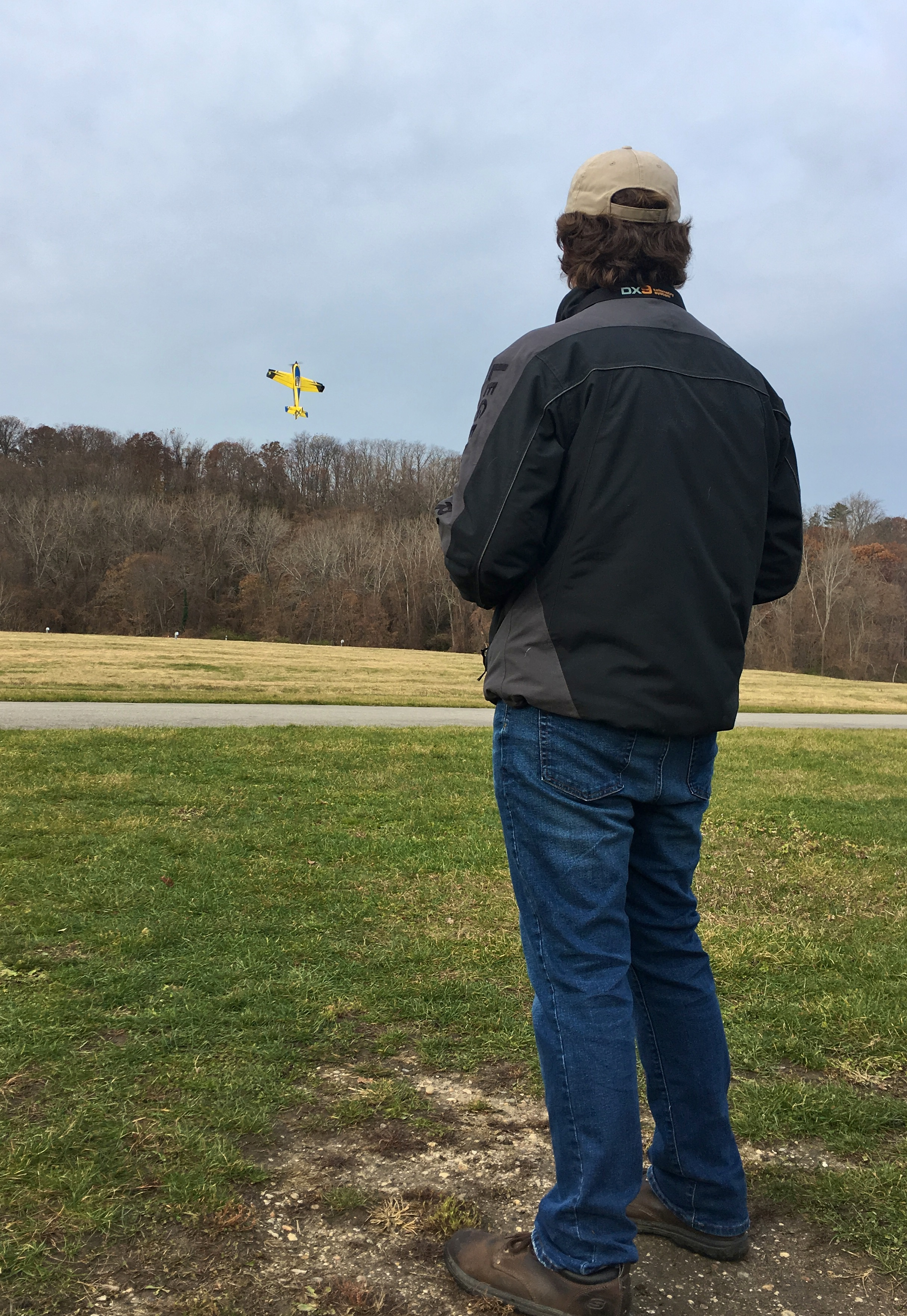
Hovering in place

Hover You pull the aircraft into a completely vertical attitude and allow the propeller to hold the aeroplane in the air in plane much like a helicopter. This is the most basic 3D manoeuvre and usually the first one new modelers want to learn

Torque Roll The plane is made to hover in place, rotating around its roll axis. This is an extension of a Hover whereas the Torque of the engine rolls the aeroplane.

Elevator The aircraft is stalled with a large amount of elevator up or down. This causes the plane to descend vertically.

Wall The Wall is where the aeroplane is made to come to a stalled stop to a vertical position from a previous horizontal flight path, usually this is executed prior a Hover.

Alien Wall The same as a Wall but pulled into full vertical position violently at high speed.

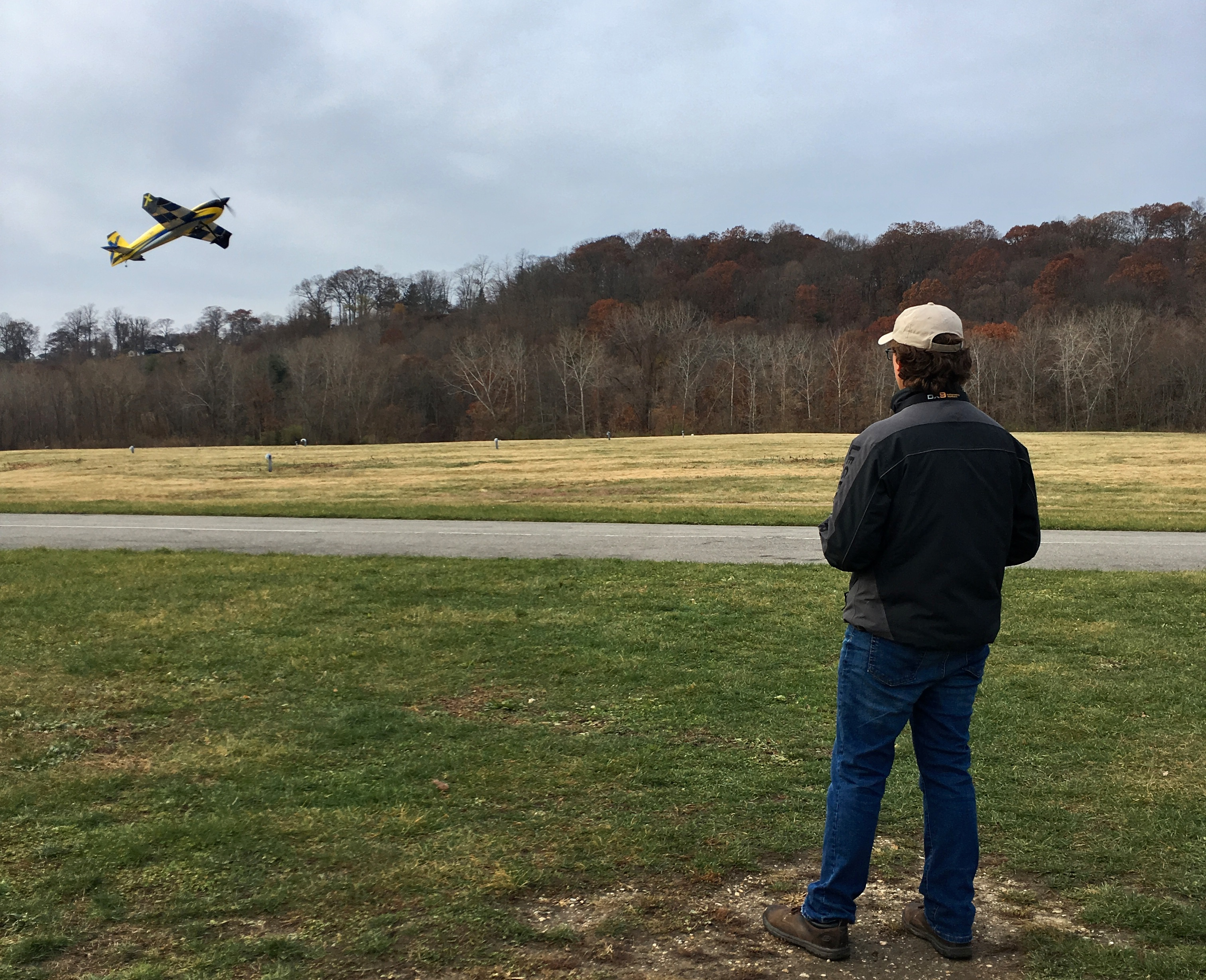
Harrier flight

Harrier A very slow forward flight motion with the nose high at about 45 degrees of attitude.

Inverted Harrier The same as the above, just inverted. Most capable pilots find this easier than a standard harrier due to the wing being above the center of gravity rather than below it.

Harrier Roll Like the Harrier manoeuvre but with a roll performed simultaneously.

Flat spin A spin induced with full up elevator, full rudder, and full aileron. Once the spin is initiated you will level the ailerons and increase engine speed a bit to pull the aircraft around. This will in turn flatten the spin.

Inverted Flat spin The same as the above but inverted. Inverted flat spins are easier to control, but can be hard to come out of due to orientation, and knowing when to stop the spin. When entering an inverted flat spin, you must apply opposite aileron to which the rudder is going. Once the spin is initiated, you do the same as a standard Flat Spin.

Waterfall The waterfall is a move where the plane is made to pivot 360 degrees in the pitch axes. Ideally this is performed with little altitude gain or forward motion.

Blender Form of entering an inverted flat spin from a nose down attitude. The pilot applies full aileron, then rudder in the opposite direction and full down elevator. The plane will "snap" and then the pilot must neutralize aileron (and in some cases apply aileron in the same direction as the rudder) and the plane will be in an inverted flat spin.

Pop-Top Same as a blender, but going up. The pilot must have a good deal of speed on an upline, then apply full aileron followed by opposite rudder and full down elevator (very similar to the blender). Then neutralize aileron and lessen elevator and the plane will spin while motionless in the air. This manoeuvre has a large "wow factor" because the plane is literally stopped dead in the air for a second or two.

Turn-Around A Turn-Around is a figure to go from upright to inverted and opposite. To go from upright: go straight up make a quarter roll Cut your throttle and apply full rudder and down elevator. That all has to come in a special timing at the same time with your throttle management. To go from inverted is the same but opposite rudder. After that your plane should go opposite way in a down elevator.

Crankshaft description comes...

Pin-Wheel description comes...

Rifle-Roll description comes...

Weeble-Wobble description comes...

High Alpha Knife Edge description comes...

Knife Edge Spin description comes...

Slip description comes...

horizontal Snake description comes...

vertical Snake description comes...

Funnel Hover description comes...

== Helicopter Manoeuvres ==
Loop

- Inside loop. A vertical circle commenced from horizontally and with level flight. A positive pitch is applied throughout the movement so the upper surfaces of the aircraft are pointing towards the center of the circle. The circle must remain perfectly round, with entry and exit to be at the same altitude.
- Outside loop. A vertical circle commenced from horizontally and with level flight. A negative pitch is applied throughout the movement so the lower surfaces of the aircraft are pointing towards the center of the circle. The circle must remain perfectly round, with entry and exit to be at the same altitude.

Pogo A hover that causes the helicopter to climb and descend.

Roll A 360 degree revolution around the longitudinal axis.

Snap Up

                   "Tic-toc"        "Funnel"

== See also ==
- 3D Masters
- Radio-controlled aircraft
- Radio-controlled helicopter
- RC flight simulator
- Extra EA-300
