= Enric =

- Pronunciation: Eastern Catalan: [ənˈrik]
- Gender: Male

Origin
- Origin: Catalan language
- Meaning: "home ruler" or "Lord of the house"
- Region of origin: Catalonia, Andorra, Valencia, Balearic Islands, Alguer, La Franja

Other names
- Related names: Henry, Enrico, Heinrich, Enrique, Henrique, Henri

Enric (Catalan pronunciation: [ənˈrik]) is a Catalan common given name, the Catalan variant of Heinrich of Germanic origin. Equivalents in other languages include Henry (English), Enrico (Italian), Henrik (Scandinavian), Henri (French, German), Enrique (Spanish) or Henrique (Portuguese) among others. Enric may refer to:

- Enric Barbat (1943–2011), Catalan singer-songwriter
- Enric Bernat (1923–2003), the founder of the Chupa Chups lollipop company
- Enric Bernat (born 1997), Spanish footballer
- Enric Bug (born 1957), Catalan comic book writer and industrial designer
- Enric Casadevall Medrano, Andorran politician
- Enric Duran (born 1976), anticapitalist activist
- Enric Garriga i Trullols (1926–2011), Catalan politician
- Enric Gensana (1936–2005), footballer
- Enric Llaudet (1916–2003), Catalan businessman
- Enric Madriguera (1904–1975), Catalan violinist
- Enric Marco (1921–2022), author
- Enric Martí Carreto, Catalan textile entrepreneur
- Enric Martínez-Castignani (born 1970), Italo-Spanish baritone
- Enric Mas, cyclist
- Enric Masip (born 1969), handball player
- Enric Miralles (1955–2000), Catalan architect
- Enric Morera i Viura (or Enrique Morera) (1865–1942), Catalan musician and composer
- Enric Prat de la Riba (1879–1917), Catalan politician
- Enric Reyna (born 1940), builder, president of FC Barcelona in 2003
- Enric Sagnier (1858–1931), Catalan architect
- Enric Sala (born 1968), marine ecologist
- Enric Sarasol (born 1964), Valencian pilota player
- Enric Vallès (born 1990), Catalan footballer
- Enric Valor i Vives (1911–2000), Valencian narrator and grammarian
- Joan Enric Vives Sicília (born 1949), Bishop of Urgell and Co-Prince of Andorra

== See also ==
- Auditori Enric Granados, concert hall in Lleida
