= Kike (given name) =

Spanish given name, diminutive of Enrique

Kike (Spanish pronunciation: /ˈkike/ KEE-keh; English pronunciation: /ˈkiːkeɪ/ KEE-kay), also spelled Quique, is a Spanish masculine given name, often as a diminutive of Enrique. Because it is spelled identically to an English-language antisemitic slur, the name is sometimes instead spelled Kiké (/kiːˈkeɪ/ kee-KAY) in English, using a French-style acute accent to emphasize the differing pronunciation, although in Spanish this would lead to the mispronunciation.

== People ==
=== Football (soccer) ===
- Kike Barja (born 1997), Spanish football winger, full name Enrique Barja Afonso
- Kike Boula (born 1993), Equatoguinean football forward, full name Enrique Boula Senobua
- Kike Burgos (born 1971), Spanish retired football goalkeeper, full name Enrique Burgos Carrasco
- Kike Carrasco (born 1998), Spanish football back and winger, full name Luis Enrique Carrasco Acosta
- Kike Echávarri (born 1994), Spanish football central defender, full name Enrique Javier Montesinos Echávarri
- Kike García (Spanish footballer) (born 1989), Spanish football striker, full name Enrique García Martínez
- Kike García (Venezuelan footballer) (born 1982), Venezuelan football midfielder, full name Enrique García Feijoó
- Kike Hermoso (born 1999), Spanish football central defender, full name Enrique Gómez Hermoso
- Kike López (born 1988), Spanish football right winger or right back, full name Enrique López Delgado
- Kike Márquez (born 1989), Spanish football left winger, full name Enrique Márquez Climent
- Kike Mateo (born 1979), Spanish football manager and retired midfielder, full name Enrique Mateo Montoya
- Kike Pérez (born 1997), Spanish football midfielder, full name Enrique Pérez Muñoz
- Kike Rodríguez (born 1991), Peruvian football central defender, full name Enrique Rodríguez Castillo
- Kike Saverio (born 1999), Italian-born football winger in Spain, full name Javier Enrique Delgado Saverio
- Kike Sola (born 1986), Spanish retired football striker, full name Enrique Sola Clemente
- Kike Tortosa (footballer, born 1983), Spanish football right back, full name Enrique Tortosa García
- Kike Tortosa (footballer, born 1991), Spanish football forward, full name Enrique Tortosa Palma

=== Other sports ===
- Kike (futsal player, born 1978), Spanish futsal player, full name Enrique Boned Guillot
- Kike Hernández (born 1991), Puerto Rican professional baseball player, full name Enrique José Hernández González Jr.
- Ritva "Kike" Elomaa (born 1955), Finnish female bodybuilder, singer, and politician

=== Outside of sport ===
- Kike Maíllo (born 1975), Spanish film director and screenwriter
- Kike Oniwinde (born 1992), British entrepreneur and former javelin thrower

== See also ==
- Kike (disambiguation)
- Enrique (disambiguation)
- Quique (given name)
