= Bacigalupo =

Bacigalupo (Ligurian: Bâçigalô) is an Italian surname from Liguria, literally translating to 'wolf-wounder'. Notable people with the surname include:

- Ana Mariella Bacigalupo, Peruvian anthropologist
- Enrique Bacigalupo (1938–2026), Argentine and Spanish judge and lawyer
- Giuseppe Bacigalupo (1744–1821), Italian painter
- Manlio Bacigalupo (1908–1977), Italian association football goalkeeper
- Manuel Bacigalupo (1916–1965), Peruvian cyclist
- Massimo Bacigalupo (born 1947), Italian filmmaker, translator, essayist and literary critic
- Nélida María Bacigalupo (1924–2019), Argentine botanist
- Renato Bacigalupo (1908–1979), Italian Olympic swimmer
- Rolando Bacigalupo (1914–1989), Peruvian Olympic basketball player
- Scott Bacigalupo (fl. 1991–1994), American lacrosse goaltender
- Valerio Bacigalupo (1924–1949), Italian association football goalkeeper, brother of Manlio

== See also ==
- Bacigalupi (surname)
