= Abanto (Basque country) =

Abanto y Ciérvana-Abanto Zierbena
- Municipality
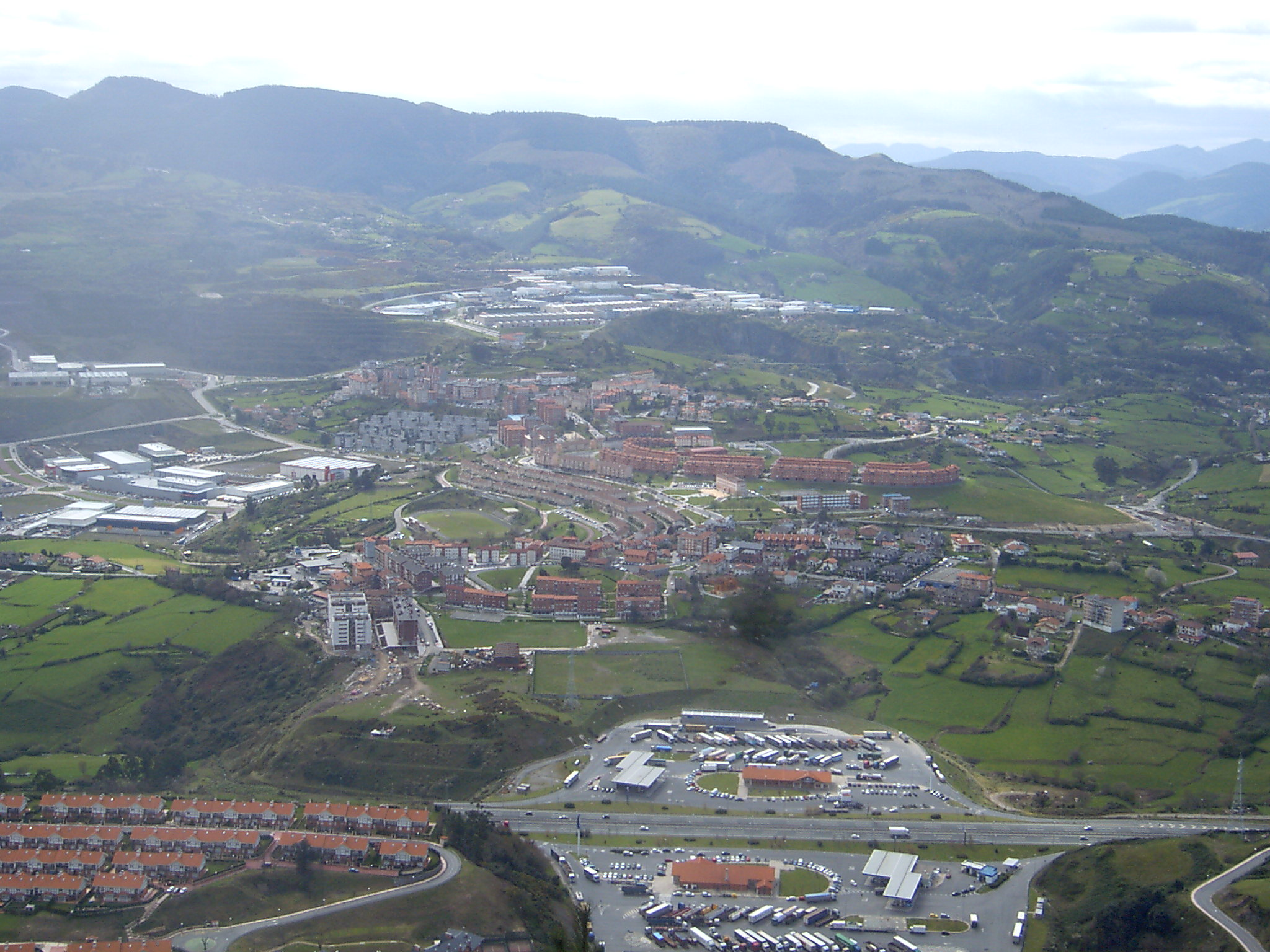
- Gallarta, the municipality's main ward

- Flag Coat of arms

- Location of Abanto y Ciérbana-Abanto Zierbena within the Basque Country Location of Abanto y Ciérbana-Abanto Zierbena within Spain
- Coordinates: 43°18′53″N 3°4′19″W
- Country: Spain
- Autonomous community: Basque Country
- Province: Biscay
- Comarca: Greater Bilbao

Government
  - Alcalde: Manuel Tejada Lanbarri (EAJ-PNV)

Area
  - Total: 18.03 km^{2} (6.96 sq mi)
- Elevation: 128 m (420 ft)
- Highest elevation: 540 m (1,770 ft)
- Lowest elevation: 8 m (26 ft)

Population (2025-01-01)
  - Total: 9,379
  - Density: 520.2/km^{2} (1,347/sq mi)
- Demonym: abantarra
- Time zone: UTC+1 (CET)
  - Summer (DST): UTC+2 (CEST)
- Postal code: 48500 & 48540
- Official language(s): Basque and Spanish
- Website: Official website

Abanto y Ciérvana-Abanto Zierbena is a municipality located in the province of Biscay, in the autonomous community of Basque Country, in the north of Spain.

Administratively, it has been separate from its neighbour Zierbena, about 5 kilometres (3.1 mi) to the north, since 1995; however, its name has never been officially shortened to Abanto due to there being a small village of that name in the Aragón region. The vast majority of the municipality's population does not reside in the tiny hamlet of Abanto, but in the former mining settlement of Gallarta, nowadays a commuter town for Bilbao with motorway connection (Autovía A-8), train station (Cercanías Bilbao C2 line) and a large industrial estate.

== Neighborhoods ==
Abanto was originally divided into concejos, Susoko Abanto or Abanto de Suso and Yusoko Abanto or Abanto de Yuso, nowadays administratively divided into neighborhoods or wards:

- Susoko Abanto
  - Abanto (pop. 59)
  - Campillo (pop. 32)
  - Gallarta (town center, pop. 5,107)
  - Balastera (pop. 68)
  - Florida (pop. 9)
  - Las Calizas (Pop. 44)
  - Picón (pop. 21)
  - Santa Juliana (pop. 146)
  - Triano (pop. 52)
- Yusoko Abanto
  - Cotorrio (pop. 154)
  - Las Carreras (pop. 1,814)
  - Las Cortes (pop. 7)
  - El Once (pop. 3)
  - Olabarrieta (Pop. 55)
  - Murrieta (pop. 51)
  - Putxeta (pop. 269)
  - San Pedro Abanto (pop. 46)
  - Sanfuentes (pop. 1,675)

== List of mayors of Abanto y Ciérvana-Abanto Zierbena, since 1842 ==
- January 1842 – January 1843 Andrés José de San Martín
- January 1843 - July 1843 Emeterio del Alisal
- July 1843 - March 1844 Benigno Ruiz de Murga
- March 1844 – 1 January 1846 José María de Arechabaleta
- 1 January 1846 – 3 January 1847 Juan Francisco del Merro
- 3 January 1847 – 1 January 1850 Miguel de Escuza
- 1 January 1850 – 1 January 1854 Pablo de los Heros
- 1 January 1854 – 2 October 1854 Francisco de Robledo
- 2 October 1854 – 12 March 1857 José González y El Cerro
- 12 March 1857 – 1 January 1859 Cosme de Allende
- 1 January 1859 – 1 January 1861 Miguel de Escuza
- 1 January 1861 – 1 January 1865 José de Aranguren
- 1 January 1865 – 1 January 1867 Ruperto de Lejarza
- 1 January 1867 – 1 January 1869 Manuel de Garay y Laza
- 1 January 1869 - March 1872 Agapito de Sasia
- March 1872 – September 1873 Antonio Hurtado
- September 1873 – January 1874 Agustín Yarto
- January 1874 – 1 January 1875 Antonio de Escuza (dean)
- 1 January 1875 – 1 January 1876 Maximino de Uriarte
- 1 January 1876 – 7 March 1876 Manuel Chave (accidental)
- 7 March 1876 – 11 April 1876 Juan Ángel de Allende
- 11 April 1876 – 1 April 1877 José Antonio Escuza
- 1 April 1877 – 1 July 1879 Mamerto Bermeosolo
- 1 July 1879 – 1 July 1881 Juan Ángel de Allende
- 1 July 1881 – 1 July 1885 Mariano de Olabarría
- 1 July 1885 – 1 January 1890 Calisto López Sáez
- 1 January 1890 – 1 July 1891 Eugenio Solano
- 1 July 1891 – 1 January 1894 Agustín Iza Rementería
- 1 January 1894 - October 1900 Calisto López Sáez
- 3 November 1900 – 1 January 1904 Agustín Iza Rementería
- 1 January 1904 – 1 January 1906 Agustín Garmendia
- 1 January 1906 – 1 January 1910 Bernardo Ruiz Elizondo
- 1 January 1910 - January 1912 Alejo Egusquizaga Bilbao
- Urtarrila 1912 - January 1914 Manuel Asla
- January 1914 – 1 January 1916 José Salcedo Zubaran
- 1 January 1916 – 1 January 1918 Luis Sanjinés
- 1 January 1918 – 1 January 1920 Fabriciano Torróntegui
- 1 January 1920 – 1 October 1923 Antonio Pujana Meave
- 1 October 1923 – 26 March 1924 Dionisio Ureta Balparda
- 26 March 1924 – 12 March 1930 Tomás Quintana Martín
- 12 March 1930 – 31 January 1931 Dionisio Ureta Balparda
- 31 January 1931 – 15 April 1931 Francisco de Uribe Urioste
- 15 April 1931 – 28 April 1931 Nemesio Merodio Ramos (provisional)
- 28 April 1931 – 14 November 1934 Antonio Pujana Meave
- 14 November 1934 – 23 February 1936 José Colón Laza
- 23 February 1936 – 2 July 1937 Antonio Pujana Meave
- 2 July 1937 – 9 February 1938 Luis Sanjinés Renovales
- 9 February 1938 – 3 May 1952 José Colón Laza
- 3 May 1952 – 29 August 1955 Eugenio Mendicote Mardones
- 29 August 1955 – 5 December 1959 Juan Ramón Sánchez-Serrano Múgica
- 5 December 1959 – 26 August 1964 Francisco Garaygordobil Barrutia
- 26 August 1964 – 14 December 1969 Tomás Alonso García
- 14 December 1969 – 10 September 1974 José Antonio Romero Onaindia
- 10 September 1974 – 19 April 1979 Luis Andrés Merodio García
- 19 April 1979 – 23 May 1983 Francisco Puerto Balmisa
- 23 May 1983 – July 1987 Luis María Vallejo López
- July 1987 – 15 June 1991 Francisco Puerto Balmisa
- 15 June 1991 - 1995 Luis María Vallejo López
- 1995 – 2003 Juan José Mezcorta Puertollano
- 2003 – 2013 Manuel Tejada Lanbarri
- 2013 – in charge Maite Etxebarria Azpiolea

== Notable people ==
- Dolores Ibárruri (1895–1989), Spanish Republican communist politician
- Isaac Puente (1896–1936), physician and anarcho-communist
- Nélida Zaitegi (b. 1946), teacher and pedagogue

== Demographics ==
Historical population
Year	Pop.	±%
1900	8,337	—
1910	9,053	+8.6%
1920	9,679	+6.9%
1930	9,870	+2.0%
1940	9,576	−3.0%
1950	9,419	−1.6%
1960	11,340	+20.4%
1970	10,121	−10.7%
1981	9,490	−6.2%
1991	9,351	−1.5%
2000	8,989	−3.9%
2010	9,724	+8.2%

== See also ==
- Zierbena
