= Quique (given name) =

Quique is a male given name in Spanish-speaking countries, often a diminutive form (hypocorism) of Enrique.

Notable people with the name include:

- Quique Lucca (1912–2016), Puerto Rican musician
- Quique Costas (born 1947), Spanish football defender and manager
- Quique Wolff (born 1949), Argentine football defender and journalist
- Quique Setién (born 1958), Spanish football midfielder and football manager
- Quique Ramos (born 1956), Spanish football defensive midfielder
- Quique Hernández (born 1958), Spanish football manager
- Quique Sinesi (born 1960), Argentine guitarist
- Quique Sánchez Flores (born 1965), Spanish football defender and football manager
- Quique Estebaranz (born 1965), Spanish football forward
- Quique Medina (born 1967), Spanish football defender and manager
- Quique Dacosta (born 1972), Spanish chef
- Quique Martín (born 1972), Spanish football forward
- Quique González (singer) (born 1973), Spanish singer-songwriter
- Quique Neira (born 1973), Chilean reggae singer
- Quique Álvarez (born 1975), Spanish football defender
- Quique de Lucas (born 1978), Spanish football attacking midfielder
- Quique Ortiz (born 1979), Argentine football wing-back
- Quique Escamilla (born 1980), Mexican-Canadian folk musician
- Quique de la Mata (born 1984), Spanish football midfielder
- José "Quique" Rivera (born 1986), Puerto Rican stop-motion animator and filmmaker
- Quique González (footballer) (born 1990), Spanish footballer
- Quique Rivero (born 1992), Spanish football midfielder
- Quique Fornos (born 1997), Spanish football defender
- José Quique Meléndez, Puerto Rican politician
- Quique Somenzini, Argentine aircraft pilot

== See also ==
- Kike (given name)
- Quique (disambiguation)
- Enrique (disambiguation)
