= Quique =

Quique may refer to:

- Quique (given name)
- Quique (album), 1993 album by the electronic music group Seefeel
- Quique (footballer, born 1945), Spanish football defender
- David Bernier (born 1977), Puerto Rican politician nicknamed "Quique"

== See also ==
- Enrique (disambiguation)
- Kike (disambiguation)
