= Hamu =

Hamu is a surname and given name. Notable people with the name include:

- Ana Hamu (died 1848), Māori woman
- Bruna Hamú (born 1990), Brazilian actress and model
- Hamu Kayondo (born 1990), Ugandan cricket player
- Hamu Shiru (died 1932), Yezidi tribal leader
