= Bacigalupi (surname) =

Bacigalupi (Ligurian: Bâçigalô) is an Italian surname from Liguria, literally translating to 'wolf-wounder'. Notable people with the surname include:

- Don Bacigalupi (born 1960), American curator and museum administrator
- Eusebi Güell i Bacigalupi (1846–1918), Spanish entrepreneur
- Montserrat Sabater Bacigalupi (1940–2020), Spanish publisher
- Paolo Bacigalupi (born 1972), American science fiction and fantasy writer
- Rimo Bacigalupi (1901–1996), American botanist

== See also ==
- Bacigalupo
