= Jeunesses Musicales World Orchestra =

Youth orchestra

The Jeunesses Musicales World Orchestra was a program of Jeunesses Musicales International. It was founded in 1949 by Igor Markevitch but its permanent structure dates back to 1970, when Gilles Lefebvre consolidated the world's first youth orchestra. During this period the orchestra had the residence in Canada, from 1988 to 2004 it moved to Berlin and actually its headquarters is in Spain with the support of Valencian region.

== A look in the recent past ==
The Jeunesses Musicales World Orchestra has had its headquarters in Valencia, Spain since 2005, when maestro Josep Vicent became its artistic director and Principal Conductor. It is composed of 100 musicians from 40 countries and it has toured in China, The Netherlands, Spain, Austria, Cyprus and Germany. In Summer 2008 it travelled to Canada where maestro Franz Paul Decker conducted.

The World Orchestra started this new period in Valencia showing its artistic project to China to mark the 60th anniversary of the signing of peace between China and Japan. The Netherlands and Austria were next. The orchestra came back in the Winter of 2007 to the Kurhaus (Scheveningen), the place where The World Orchestra was born. It has played in Cyprus and Germany (its previous administrative home) in the Winter of 2007 to perform in the Berlin Philharmonie.

The World Orchestra has made performances in Spain. Apart from symphonic concerts in numerous concert halls as El Palau de les Arts Reina Sofía in Valencia, Palau de la Música of Valencia, Teatro Monumental of Madrid or GREC Festival of Barcelona, the orchestra ran a Chamber Music festival, with concerts for String Quartet, Brass ensemble and Percussion Group. JMWO was also the resident orchestra of Nits de la Mediterrània Music festival and also was in charge of the music of the Opera ‘Puss in Boots’ (a co-production with Teatro Real of Madrid and Teatre Liceu of Barcelona). Some of JMWO musicians took part in the filming of new movie on Valencian composer Martin y Soler. One concert was for the finals of the 32nd America's Cup Competition. The World Orchestra joined forces with Orquesta de Valencia with almost 150 musicians on stage.

Its concerts have been broadcast live in numerous TV programs and Radio stations and have been recorded for RTVE, RTVV, RNE, and the EBO. During its tour in China the Valencian TV-RTVV made a documentary film called Sound for Peace.

== Repertoire ==
The repertoire of The World Orchestra under the baton of Josep Vicent included pieces by Tchaikovsky, Markevitch, Bartók, Ginastera, Turina, Adams, Mossolov, Prokofiev, Rimsky-Korsakov, Dvořák, Ravel, Beethoven, Piazzolla, Ibert, Zheng Lu & Ma Hongye, Sibelius, Gershwin, Bernstein, Stravinsky, Mozart, Martín y Soler, Falla, Stylianou and Xavier Montsalvatge.

== Guest Conductors and soloists ==
Numerous Guest Conductors and soloists joined the orchestra during this period such as Mihaela Ursuleasa, Iván Martín, Yayoi Toda, Gwyneth Wentink, Yaron Traub, Mayte Martín, Roberto Balistreri, Enric Martínez-Castignani, Alina Pogostkina, Marisa Martins, Mª Luz Martínez or Miguel Zapater. Next Summer 2008 The World Orchestra will be joined by cellist Laurence Lesser, violinist Mitsuoko Usioda soprano Marianne Fiset and maestro Franz Paul Decker.

== World premières ==
The Jeunesses Musicales World Orchestra has premiered five pieces by new composers: Good News From Beijing by Zheng Lu & Ma Hongye, Pax Haganum by Joan Albert Amargós, Ketsana by Emmanuel Séjourné and the new piece specially written by Séjourné for the finals of the 32nd America's Cup. In Summer 2008 it will premiere the revised version of José Evangelista's O Bali, Josep Vicent's composition Ouverture Release for percussion trio and orchestra and Andrés Valero's GP, f-1.

== UNESCO Artist for Peace ==
As UNESCO Artist for Peace its concerts are committed to peace, interculturality and cooperation between cultures. During the two first seasons held in Valencia The World Orchestra visited China to commemorate the Chinese-Japanese Peace Treaty. Besides numerous concerts for peace in Kurhaus (The Hague), The World Orchestra reinforced its engagement with peace travelling to Cyprus to play concerts for war refugees of the armed conflict between Israel and the Lebanon and performing in Barcelona's GREC Festival as a homage to those who lived the tragedy of the Spanish Civil War.

== History ==
The World Orchestra came into being with the creation of a young orchestra for the Jeunesses Musicales International project. In the period 1949 to 1969, in the Netherlands, the violinist Arthur Grumiaux, Director of the Igor Markevitch Orchestra and other key musicians resolved, as part of the Jeunesses Musicales assemblies, to put together an international orchestra inspired in the vision of Sir Robert Mayer, creator of the orchestral concerts for children in the 1920s.

It was in Canada in 1968 that Gilles Lefebvre proposed the transformation of this ‘orchestral conference’ into an ensemble that would develop under the wand of an experienced conductor. Lefebvre envisaged that such an ensemble would receive and continue the education of the best young musicians of the Jeunesses Musicales member countries. Right from its inception, this project in music education was noted for its rigour and professional quality. These standards have persisted to the present day and it has attained world recognition. Success has come quickly due to the high artistic quality; furthermore, the World Orchestra has become a symbol, through excellence in music, of solidarity and co-operation between the nations of the world.

In 1986, the orchestra established its headquarters in Berlin and offered concerts in the name of peace on both sides of the infamous wall that divided the city. Since then, the World Orchestra has been registered as a harmonious association of musicians without frontiers. As recognition of its peace-building efforts, in 1996 the UNESCO granted it the distinction of ‘Artist for Peace’ with which it has travelled the world over.

During the 1960s and 1970s, WOJM went on several tours to Canada, Denmark, Belgium, Italy, the U.K., Japan, the U.S. and Switzerland under such outstanding masters as Zubin Mehta, Leonard Bernstein, Michael Tilson Thomas and Serge Baudo.

In the 1980s, Walter Weller, Hiroyuki Iwaki, Eduardo Mata, Jeffrey Tate, Vernon Handley, Charles Dutoit and Michel Tabachnik among many others directed the orchestra. That period saw the orchestra travelling to Germany, Hungary, France, Spain, the U.S., Canada, Japan, South Korea, Poland, Austria, Sweden, Norway, Denmark, Uruguay and Argentina.

In the 1990s, the World Orchestra was to be seen in Germany, Belgium, Canada, Denmark, Russia, Estonia, Sweden, Latvia, Finland, Norway, The Netherlands, Poland, Spain, France, the Philippines, Malaysia, South Korea, Switzerland, and Israel. In those years the baton was held by Kurt Masur, Franz-Paul Decker, Antonio Pappano, En Shao, Yuri Temirkanov and Kent Nagano and well known soloists as Bobby McFerrin or Yehudi Menuhin joined the orchestra. With the status of Artist for Peace, the World Orchestra performed to commemorate the 50th anniversary of State of Israel (1998), the 350th anniversary of the Peace of Westphalia (1998), and in the commemorative events marking the beginning of the Second World War in Warsaw (1999). In the year 2000, it toured south-eastern Europe (Slovenia, Croatia, former Yugoslavia, Bosnia-Herzegovina and Macedonia).

== See also ==
- List of youth orchestras
