= Casadevall =

Casadevall is a surname and a given name. Notable people with the name include:

Surname:

- Arturo Casadevall, professor of Molecular Microbiology & Immunology and Infectious Diseases at the Johns Hopkins Bloomberg School of Public Health and Johns Hopkins School of Medicine
- Josep Casadevall (born 1946), Andorran lawyer born in Spain, judge of the European Court of Human Rights in respect of Andorra
- Josep Maria Valles i Casadevall (born 1940), Spanish academic and politician
- Josep Pla i Casadevall (1897–1981), Spanish journalist and a popular author
- Maria Casadevall (born 1987), Brazilian actress

Given name:

- Enric Casadevall Medrano, Andorran politician
