= Servicio Geológico Minero =

Argentine Geological & Mining Service Servicio Geológico Minero Argentino
- Abbreviation: SEGEMAR
- Legal status: Government Organisation
- Purpose: Geoscience
- Headquarters: Buenos Aires
- Region served: Argentina
- Parent organization: Secretary of Mining
- Staff: 348
- Website: www.segemar.gov.ar

Servicio Geológico Minero is an Argentine government institution aimed at producing geological, mining and environmental information to achieve sustained development and mitigate geological hazards.

The institution has its origin at the fusion of Dirección General de Minas y Geología and Comisión de Estudios de Napas de Agua y Yacimientos Carboníferos in 1904. Its first director was Enrique Hermitte who served in the charge until 1922. With Hermitte in charge the institution attracted a number European geologist to work for the institution including Richard Stappenbeck, John Keidel and Walther Penck.
