= Ikey =

Ikey or IKey may refer to:

== People ==
=== People with the nickname ===
- nickname of John C. Karel (1873–1938), American politician, judge, lawyer, college football player and coach
- Isaiah "Ikey" Owens (1974–2014), American keyboardist
- Ikey Solomon (1787?–1850), English criminal fence, regarded as the model for Charles Dickens' character Fagin

=== Pseudonym ===
- Ikey Solomons, Esq. Junior, William Makepeace Thackeray's pen name for Catherine, his first novel

== Other uses ==
- IKey, an American computer parts manufacturer
- Ikeys, nickname is University of Cape Town
  - Ikey Tigers, a University of Cape Town rugby union team

== See also ==
- Kike (disambiguation)
