= Zapater =

Zapater is a surname. Notable people with the surname include:

- Alberto Zapater (born 1985), Spanish footballer
- Bernardo Zapater (1823–1907), Spanish Catholic priest
- Enrique Bacigalupo Zapater (1938–2026), Argentine and Spanish judge and lawyer
- Martín Zapater (1747–1803), Aragonese merchant
