= Hemoye Shero =

Yazidi tribal leader (died 1932)

- Hemoyê Şero
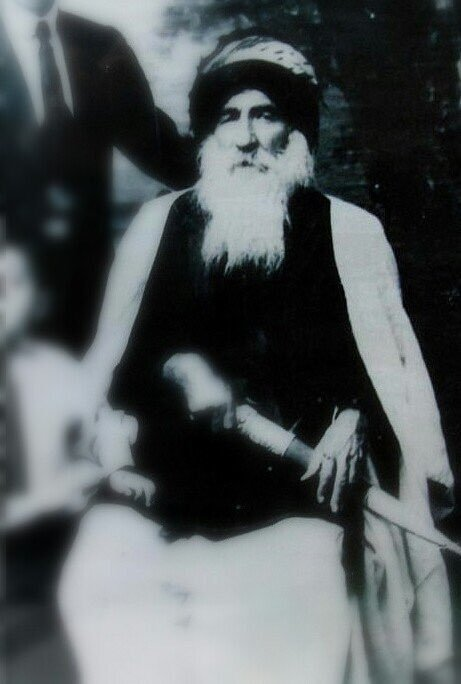
- Born: Sinjar, Ottoman Empire
- Died: 1932; Shingal, Kingdom of Iraq
- Military career
- Allegiance: Yazidis of Shingal, Fuqara tribe
- Conflicts: World War I: Mesopotamian campaign

Hemoye Shero, Hamu Shiru, (Kurmanji: Hemoyê Şero; died 1932), was a nineteenth century Yezidi tribal leader from the Shingal Mountains in what was the Ottoman Empire. Hemoye Shero was instrumental in transforming one of the Yezidi social classes, the faqirs, into a tribal entity and establishing himself as the chief.

== Early life ==
Hemoye Shero's father is believed to have established his family in Jabal Sinjar sometime during the mid-nineteenth century. During this period, Hemoye Shero's father was initiated into the Yezidi Faqir Order. By the 1870s, Hemoye Shero, now himself a member of the faqir order, seems to have assumed his father's position and began to wield influence over a group of followers as well as some extra-Shingali tribal groups with whom he may have been, or at least gave himself out to be, related (the Sharkiyyan and the Dinadiyya of the Sheikhan district northeast of Mosul).

== Rise of the Faquara' Tribe ==
Prior to the 1890s, Hemoye Shero continued to consolidate his position among the Jabal Shingal Yezidi Fakirs. Prior to 1892, benefited from being relatively open to membership by any Yezidi believer. The highly-mobile order, which as the Arabic name implies, came to be organized along lines similar to Muslim Sufi mendicants. However, in the aftermath of the Vebi Pasha anti-Yezidi campaign of 1892, the numbers of Yezidi fakirs swelled. The leader of the order, Hemoye Shero, reconstituted the Fakirs as bona fide Yezidi tribe calling themselves the Faquara’ with himself as Mir. The resulting tribe became known as the Faquara' and came to dominate the northern slope of Jabal Shingal by the close of the nineteenth century.

== The Islamization Policies of Ottoman Sultan Abdul Hamid II ==
The two most powerful Kurdish tribes in the province of Mosul prior to the 1892 offensive against the Yezidi were the Musqura and Mihirkan. While these tribes were ethnically cohesive, religiously they were not. Both the Musqura and Mihirkan tribes were composed of Yezidi and Sunni adherents. For this reason, the Ottoman government supported the power of the Musqura chiefs by appointing them to the so-called Paramountcy of Shingal; however, the Pan-Islamization policies of Abdulhamid weakened the multi-sect Kurdish tribes as they fell victim to sectarian strife.

== The Ottoman Campaign of 1892 and Hemoye Shero's seizure of the Paramountcy of Shingal ==
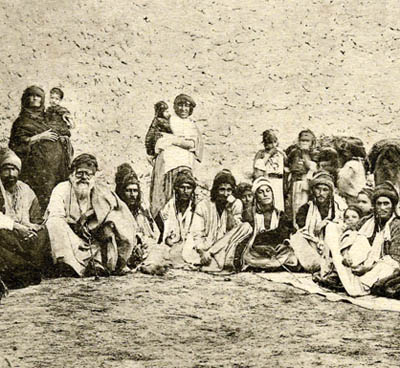
Post-Card by Sarrafian brothers of Beirut of a group of Yezidis of Jabal [mountain] of Shingal at the Iraqi-Syrian border. The Yezidis started settling in the mountain beginning in the 13th. century following the severe persecution by the Zengid Atabeg of Mosul, Badr al-Din Lulu. and later by the frequent Ottoman campaigns against the Sheikhan Yezidis north of Mosul. The mountain was a strong hold of the Nestorian Christians, whose Diocese ceased to exist after the 17th. century. The first of many campaigns by the Ottoman Turks, against the Yezidis of the Mountain, called by the Turks "THE SACLI DAGH", the mountain of the "HAIRY ONE'S", was carried by Melek Ahmad Pasha, the Vali of Diyarbekir [ 1640], the second by the Ottoman Firari Mustapha, the last occupation was in 1918, and directed against Hemoye Shero, the Sheikh of the Fuqara Yezidis, who refused to hand in the Christians refugees who sought shelter in the mountain from S.E.Turkey. Yezidi of Jabal Shingal.

In 1892, Sultan Abdulhamid ordered the implementation of a conscription policy against the Yezidi in order to induct some 15,000 men of military age into the Ottoman army. of As the Musquara chiefs in particular weakened, Hemoye Shero, who had by the 1890s established himself as chief adviser to the Paramountcy of Shingal seized the office for himself upon the death of the last Musquara Paramount Chief. Hemoye Shero's prestige was enhanced by his successful defense of the Jabal Shingal against an incursion by Omer Vebi Pasha in 1892. In the process the Faquara'' tribe captured a significant train of Ottoman arms, enough to render Jabal Shingal a considerable redoubt in military terms during the generation leading up to the outbreak of the First World War.

== Consolidation of power and relations with other religious sects, 1892 to 1918 ==
As the Faquara’ Shaykh, Hemoye Shero further consolidated his control of Jabal Shingal by accepting Yezidi refugees from the Ottoman Islamization policies regardless of clan or lineage affiliation. As other religious minorities become subject to Ottoman persecution, Hemoye Shero accepted these new refugees, i.e., Christians like the Assyrians and Armenians under Faquara’ protection. By the early 1900s, Hemoye Shero consolidated his control, particularly over the northern sector of the Shingal range, as historian Nelida Fuccaro describes below:

"Theoretically all members of this tribal community belonged to the priestly order of faqirs, to which entry was automatic by birth but which also admitted disciples by initiation. However by the Faqir Hemoye Shero created a new notion of tribal cohesion which centered upon the attributes of ‘faqirdom’ but was heavily reliant on existing tribal solidarities. In the 1930s a large part of the Fuqara’ were still claiming to be linked to the Sharqiyyan tribe, a section of the Milli tribal confederation which had settled in Shingal in the second half of the 19th century. Furthermore, the leading section of the tribe, the Mala Shiru, claimed to have originated from the Dinadiyya tribe of Shaykhan some of whose sections were already settled in Shingal in the late 18th century. In this connection during the period of the [British] mandate Hemoye Shero consistently claimed to be a Dinadi chief. The personal prestige of the first nucleus of Fakirs who gathered around Hemoye Shero was undoubtedly strengthened by a careful policy of matrimonial alliances which represented one of the kernels of Hemoye's policy on the mountain at least since the early 1900s. Marriages were arranged between Hemoye's followers and members of other Shingali groups. Membership in the tribe was also extended to those Yazidis who did not belong to the Faqir class by birth, so that the size of the group increased dramatically in a couple of decades. By 1932 the Fuqara’ tribe in Shingal consisted of 240 families divided into six factions."

== The First World War, end of Ottoman Rule, and relations with Mandatory Powers, 1918-1923 ==
The Fuquara' tribe under the leadership of Hemoye Shero became a center of anti-Ottoman and, by extension, anti-Muslim opposition during the two decades leading up to the outbreak of the First World War. During the First World War, Hemoye Shero continued his policy of sheltering Christian refugees fleeing condition within the wartime-Ottoman empire. Many of these Christians were settled in Ballad Shingal and by the end of the conflict, Christians constituted approximately 4% of the population of the mountain.

== Notes ==
- Nelida Fuccaro, The Other Kurds: Yazidis in Colonial Iraq, (New York: I.B. Tauris Publishers, 1999)
- Edip Gölbasi, The Yezidis and the Ottoman State: Modern power, military conscription, and conversion policies, 1830-1909 (Master’s Thesis: Atatürk Institute for Modern Turkish History, 2008)
- Nelida Fuccaro, ‘A 17th-century Travel Account on the Yezidis: Implications for Socio-Religious History,’ Annali dell’Instituto Universitario Orientale di Napoli 53, no. 3 (1993)
- Nelida Fuccaro, 'Communalism and the State in Iraq: The Yazidi Kurds, c.1869-1940", Middle Eastern Studies, Vol. 35, No. 2 (Apr., 1999), pp. 1–26
