= Enríquez =

Enriquez is a Spanish patronymic surname meaning "son of Enrique" and a common surname in Mexico, Ecuador and the Philippines. It can also be found on the Island of Gozo

Notable people with the surname Enriquez include:

- Alberto Enríquez Gallo (1895–1962), president of Ecuador 1937–1938
- Antonio Enríquez Gómez (1601–1661), Spanish dramatist, poet and novelist of Portuguese origin
- Baltasar de la Cueva Enríquez (1626–1686), Spanish viceroy of Peru 1674–1678
- Blanca Enriquez, American educator
- Bobby Enriquez (1943–1996), Filipino Jazz pianist
- Camilo Ponce Enríquez (politician) (1912–1976), president of Ecuador 1956–1960
- Carlos Enríquez Gómez (1900–1957), Cuban painter, illustrator and writer of the Vanguardia movement
- Enrico Enriquez (1701–1756), Italian cardinal
- Francisco Fernández de la Cueva Enríquez, 10th Duke of Alburquerque (1655–1733), Spanish viceroy of New Spain 1702–1711
- Jocelyn Enriquez (born 1974), Filipina dance singer
- José Perches Enríquez (1882–1939), Mexican musician and composer
- Joy Enriquez (born 1979), American singer and actress
- Juan Enriquez, founding director of the Life Sciences Project at Harvard Business School
- Juana Enríquez (1425–1468), Queen of Aragon, second wife of John II of Aragon
- Kataluna Enriquez (born 1993/1994), American beauty pageant contestant
- Luis Enríquez Bacalov (1933–2017), Argentine film score composer
- Luis Enríquez de Guzmán, conde de Alba de Liste (c. 1605–1667), viceroy of New Spain and Peru 1650–1661
- Manuel Curros Enríquez (1851–1908), Galician writer and journalist
- Marco Enríquez-Ominami, Chilean filmmaker and politician
- Martín Enríquez de Almanza (died 1583), Spanish viceroy of New Spain 1568–1580; viceroy of Peru 1581–1583
- Michel Enríquez (born 1979), Cuban baseball player
- Miguel Henríquez (c. 1680–1743), Puerto Rican pirate and privateer
- Miguel Enríquez Espinosa (1944–1974), Chilean revolutionary leftist leader during the Allende and Pinochet regimes
- Mike Enriquez (1951–2023), Filipino radio and television newscaster
- Payo Enríquez de Rivera (1622–1684), Spanish Augustinian friar, viceroy of New Spain 1673–1680
- René Enríquez (1933–1990), American television actor
- Silvia Hernández Enríquez (born 1948), Mexican politician, government minister 1994–1997
- Susan Enriquez (born 1962), Filipina broadcast journalist
