= Enrique Martín (disambiguation) =

Enrique Martin is the birth name of singer Ricky Martin.

Enrique Martín may also refer to:

- Enrique Martín (footballer, born 1950), Mexican footballer
- Enrique Martín (footballer, born 1956), Spanish footballer and football manager
