= Josep Vicent =

Spanish conductor

Josep Vicent is a Spanish conductor. Principal Conductor - Music Director with ADDA Simfònica of Spain. Artistic and General Director at ADDA Auditorium in Alicante, Valencian Community (Spain).

Vicent was born in Altea a town located in the musical regional of the Valencian Community in Spain and studied at the Conservatorio Superior de Música de Alicante and the Sweelinck Conservatorium in Amsterdam.

He conducts regularly orchestras like Rotterdam Philharmonic, London Symphony Orchestra, Belgian National Orchestra among many others. He was artistic director at Xenakis Festival and The Amsterdam Percussion Group. He has been also chief conductor and artistic director with Balearic Symphony Orchestra.

Currently, he is the artistic director and principal conductor at The World Orchestra and Principal Conductor & Music Director of ADDA Simfònica (the resident orchestra at ADDA Auditorium located in Alicante, Spain).

He, with ADDA Simfònica, was nominated for the 2024 Grammy Awards in the category Best Large Jazz Ensemble Album for the album The Chick Corea Symphony Tribute - Ritmo
