= Montserrat Sabater Bacigalupi =

Spanish publisher (1940–2020)

Montserrat Sabater Bacigalupi (Barcelona, 4 May 1940 – 3 April 2020) was a Spanish publisher.

== Biography ==
She began to work in the publishing sector, in her youth, at the beginning of the 1960s, working for publisher Carlos Barral. She collaborated with him in the Editorial Seix Barral, where she was given directing tasks, and together with Jaime Salinas Bonmatí she launched the Formentor Awards, during the years 1959–1962. Among the participants of the first edition of the Formentor Awards, in 1959, were Vicente Aleixandre, Dámaso Alonso, Gerardo Diego, Carles Riba, Josep Vicenç Foix, Blas de Otero, Juan Goytisolo, Carlos Barral, Gabriel Ferrater and Jaime Gil de Biedma.

In 1984, working for publisher Josep Maria Castellet, she joined the Edicions 62 team to take charge of the public relations and communication department, until her retirement in 2003. Later she collaborated with Castellet by ordering, classifying and filing all his personal collection of documents, photographs, books, pictures, etc. Thanks to this work, Sabater discovered a small notebook, written by Castellet in 1973, that the author himself had given up for lost, and later published in 2007 under the title Dietari de 1973.

In 2008 she received, along with Mabel Dodero, a tribute for her organizational work in the 1959 Formentor Poetic Awards.

She had three children: Isabel, Anna and Jordi.

She died in Barcelona on 3 April 2020, aged 79, of COVID-19, during the pandemic in Spain.
