= Kike (disambiguation) =

Kike is an ethnic slur directed at Jewish people.

Kike may also refer to:

- Kike (given name), a common diminutive of the Spanish masculine given name Enrique

== See also ==
- Ikey (disambiguation)
- Čaić, a village in the municipality of Livno, Bosnia and Herzegovina
- Kaike language, a Sino-Tibetan language of Nepal
- KEYK, former call sign of radio station KKRT in Wenatchee, Washington, United States
- Quique (disambiguation)
