= Kike Oniwinde =

British former javelin thrower

- Born: October 1992 (age 33–34)
- Education: University of Nottingham (BSc); University of Florida (MSc)
- Occupation: Entrepreneur
- Years active: 2016–present
- Known for: Founder of BYP Network

Kike Agoro is a British former javelin thrower, and the co-founder of BYP Network. BYP Network is a platform that connects Black professionals with each other and corporations.

== Early life and education ==
Agoro was born in 1992 and as a child lived in East London with her mother and two brothers. She took Economics and double Maths at A-level, gaining 'A' grades, and then entered the University of Nottingham, graduating with Upper Second class BSc Economics in 2014. She then studied at University of Florida, supported by a track and field scholarship, and gained an MSc degree in Management.

== Athletics career ==
Her skill with the javelin was recognised and she competed from 2005 onwards for Havering Athletics Club, moving to Enfield and Haringey Athletic Club in 2012. She first represented Great Britain at the European Junior Championships in Tallinn in 2011.

She won three medals in the British University Championships while at University of Nottingham, although a back injury affected her performance. While at University of Florida, she was in the university athletics team and reached the top twenty in performance with the javelin in the USA Collegiate competitions. She continued competing until 2017.

== Financial career ==
Agoro was an intern at Goldman Sachs and Citi Investment Bank while a student, and worked for a financial technology start-up after graduation. In 2016 she founded the BYP Network App to connect black young professionals with each other and corporations. In 2019 it had 30,000 members in 65 countries. She undertook the NEF Fast Track programme to support her development as an entrepreneur.

== BYP Network ==
In 2016, Oniwinde founded BYP Network, a platform aimed at connecting Black professionals with employment opportunities and corporate partners. The platform has since expanded internationally to over 200,000 members and has worked with coporate partners and sponsors including Investec, EY, UNICEF, Vodafone and Macmillan.

She is the first and only Black female founder to raise over $1m through crowdfunding. Her 1,204 investors made it the fourth-largest investor base on Seedrs at the time, proof of her ability to mobilise capital and command the trust of the community she serves.

Kike has built a trusted bridge between global business and Black talent. BYP has hosted over 300 events for more than 37,000 attendees, including its flagship leadership conference, now in its eighth year, across London, the US and online. Through these events, 350+ articles and 424 educational videos, supported by organisations such as Salesforce, Google DeepMind and Goldman Sachs, she has platformed over 500 Black leaders. Recent examples of her work at this level include sharing a keynote with Cisco's Chief People Officer at the Forbes 30/50 summit, co-hosting an event with Euromonitor at which its CEO spoke, and private leadership meetings with Coutts. Her board has included Jacky Wright and Tim Campbell MBE.

Her leadership has been recognised by governments and institutions. Under the Biden administration, the US Government named her one of the top 50 European Young Transatlantic Innovation Leaders, sponsoring her fellowship with the Chicago Urban League. She has served as Vice-Chair of the London Chamber of Commerce Black Business Association, as a board member of Getting on Board, and as a World Economic Forum Global Shaper. Boardwave profiled her as one of 25 leaders across European software in its Leaders' Lives book, alongside the CEOs of WeTransfer and AKQA.

== Awards ==
Her recognitions include the Freedom of the City of London, Sky Women in Technology Scholar, Forbes 30 Under 30, the Maserati 100, Computer Weekly's UK Top 10 Women in Tech, Stylist's top three most inspirational women, BBC 1Xtra Future Leader, and the University of Nottingham's Alumni Laureate Recent Graduate Award, where she delivered the commencement address. She was named one of 40 Black British leaders in the Black Cultural Archives' 40x40 Future Leaders campaign, and Roc Nation honoured her as one of its current heroes during Black History Month. She has appeared on every major UK broadcaster, including Sky News' Great Debate with Trevor Phillips and ITV's documentary with will.i.am.
