= Giuseppe Bacigalupo =

Italian painter

Giuseppe Bacigalupo (17 December 1744 – 5 August 1821) was an Italian painter active in Liguria.

== Biography ==
He was born in Val Fontanabuona, Tribogna, Republic of Genoa. He studied figure painting at the Accademia Ligustica until 1771. With the patronage of Giacomo Gentile, he was able to work and study in Rome from 1772 till 1777. After a start as a history and sacred subject painter, he gravitated to land- and sea-scape painting. He was influenced by a Neapolitan painter by the name of Francesco Decapo, but worked in the studio of Ignazio Unterberger.

After painting landscapes in Naples and Rome, in 1778, he returned to Genoa. In 1792, he was inducted as academic of Merit of the Accademia Ligustica. From 1806 to 1808, he taught ornamentation. He stopped painting around 1810.

His daughter, Rosa Bacigalupo Carrea (ca. 1794–1854) was also an artist.
