= Enrique Martín (footballer, born 1950) =

Mexican footballer

Personal information
- Full name: Enrique Martín del Campo Guerrero
- Date of birth: 27 December 1950 (age 75)
- Position: Defender

International career
| Years | Team | Apps | (Gls) |
- Mexico

Enrique Martín del Campo Guerrero (born 27 December 1950) is a Mexican former footballer. He competed in the men's tournament at the 1972 Summer Olympics.
