= Nélida Zaitegi =

Spanish teacher and pedagogue (born 1946)

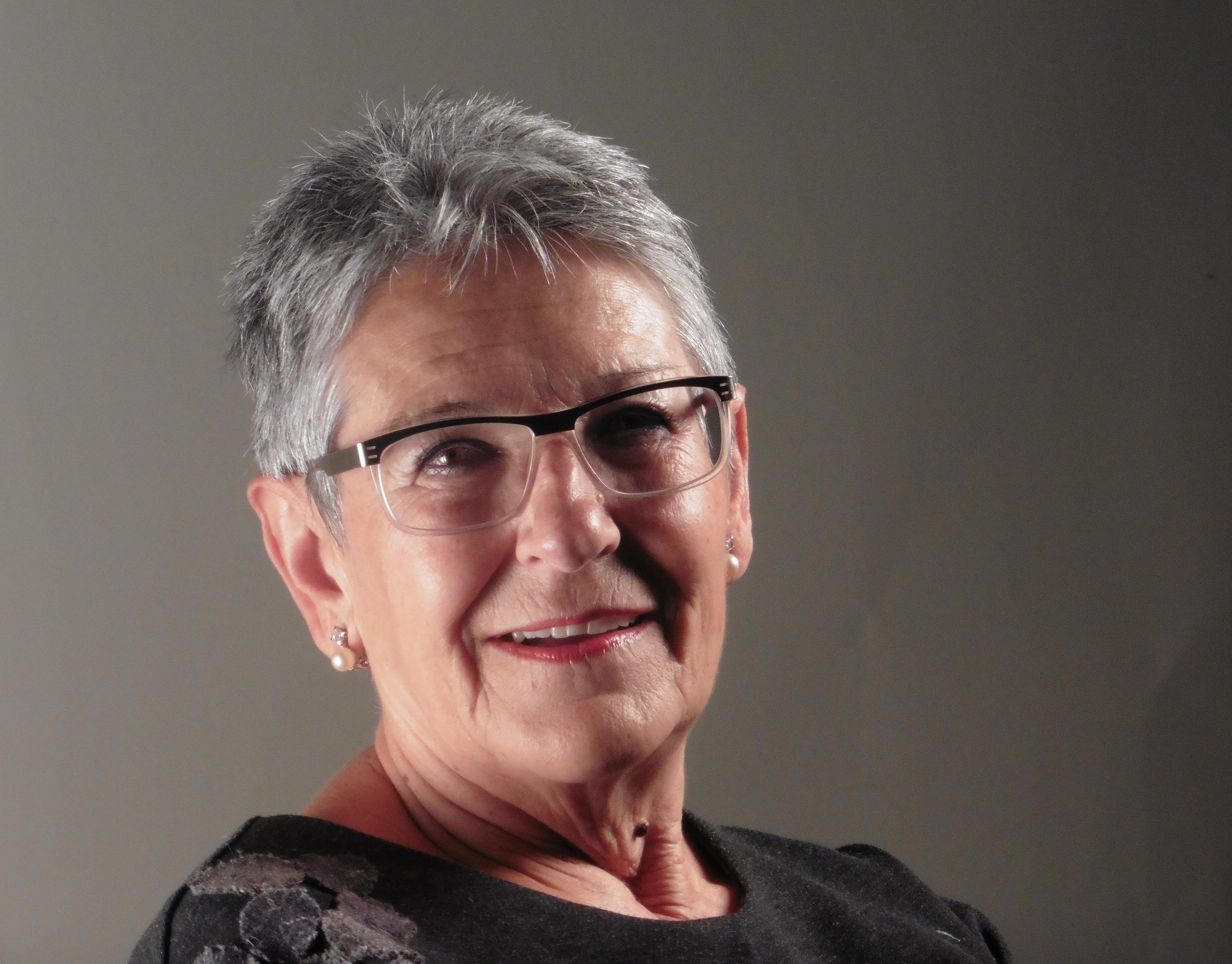
- Born: 17 October 1946 (age 79)
- Occupation: Non-fiction writer

Nélida Zaitegi de Miguel (born 17 October 1946) is a Spanish teacher and pedagogue. Her work focuses on promoting the construction of positive coexistence in educational institutions, as well as the prevention and action in cases of bullying among peers.

== Biography ==
Nélida Zaitegi de Miguel was born in Abanto Ciérvana on 17 October 1946. Her professional career began in 1967 as a teacher in a public school. She became a director, and inspector of education, responsible for innovative educational programs in the Department of Education of the Basque Government such as "Convivencia y paz" (Coexistence and Peace), "Habilidades para la vida" (Life Skills), and "Formación de equipos directivos" (Management Teams).

Zaitegi's career began at a time when Jokin Ceberio's suicide occurred and the issue of school bullying took on a central role and generated a deep debate in the Basque and state educational communities. She was put in charge of managing the initial situation with the teachers and students, as well as leading and coordinating the design of teacher training on the matter of school bullying. She was also involved in the development of the protocols and guidelines for action against bullying in the Basque Country as well as promoting positive coexistence, to include the framework for the development and implementation of coexistence plans in each educational community. One of the measures that was of greatest interest by other Autonomous communities of Spain was the creation of an electronic mailbox for reporting situations of peer abuse.

Zaitegi is the coordinator of the "Contract-Program for a New Education" in several centers throughout Spain. She has served as president of FEAE Euskadi (Foro Europeo de Administradores de Educación; European Forum of Education Administrators). She is director of OGE magazine, (Organización y Gestión Educativa), and CONVIVES magazine, also serving as CONVIVES vice-president. (Asociación para la convivencia positiva en la escuela;Association for positive coexistence in school). She is a member of the Innobasque Social Innovation Council, of the State Observatory of School Coexistence since 2011, and of the European Forum of Education Administrators of Euskal Herria.

She is a trainer and advisor in educational centers and teacher training programs of various Autonomous Communities. In March 2017, she assumed the position of president of the School Board of Euskadi.

In March 2017 she assumed the position of president of the School Council of Euskadistepping down in 2020.

Zaitegi is the author of numerous books, publications and research in the educational field, focusing on issues such as coexistence, evaluation and self-evaluation of educational centers, coeducation, and the analysis of sexist values in textbooks.

== Selected works ==
- "La coeducación como transversal" (2005) en El género quebrantado
- Cómo elaborar y seleccionar materiales coeducativos (1993) EMAKUNDE, Gobierno Vasco.
- Respuestas a los problemas de disrupción desde la Comunidad Autónoma del País Vasco.
- Trabajando en la prevención del maltrato (1995) EMAKUNDE, Gobierno Vasco.
- ¿Qué puede / debe hacer la Administración educativa? en La convivencia y los conflictos en el ámbito escolar.
- Guía para la elaboración del Plan de Convivencia Annual (PCA)
- Autoevaluación del centro educativo Taller de evaluación: Modelo de gestión evaluativa GE-Rs

== Awards ==
- 2016, Special Mention CODAPA Awards
