= Enrique González =

Enrique González (or Quique González) may refer to:

== Musicians ==
- Enrique González "La Pulga" (1890–1957), Cuban singer-songwriter
- Enrique González Mántici (1912–1974), Cuban violinist, first director of Orquesta Riverside
- Quique González (singer) (born 1973), Spanish singer-songwriter

== Politicians ==
- Enrique González Pedrero (born 1930), Mexican politician
- Enrique Parejo González (born 1930), Colombian politician
- Enrique Cárdenas González (1927–2018), Mexican politician, governor of Tamaulipas from 1975 to 1981
- Henry B. González (Enrique Barbosa González, 1916–2000), American politician and member of the U.S. House of Representatives

== Sportsmen ==
- Enrique González (fencer) (born 1933), Spanish Olympic fencer
- Enrique González (boxer) (born 1945), Chilean Olympic boxer
- Enrique Ramos González (born 1956), Spanish footballer
- Enrique González (equestrian) (born 1964), Mexican Olympic equestrian
- Enrique González (baseball) (born 1982), Venezuelan baseball player
- Tomás González (gymnast) (born 1985), Chilean artistic gymnast, complete name Enrique Tomás González Sepúlveda
- Quique González (footballer) (born 1990), Spanish footballer
- Enrique González (field hockey) (born 1996), Spanish field hockey player
- Enrique González (hurdler), Spanish hurdle athlete in 2012 World Junior Championships in Athletics – Men's 400 metres hurdles

== Writers ==
- Enrique González Martínez (1871–1952), Mexican poet
- Enrique González Rojo Sr. (1899–1939), Mexican writer
- Enrique González Rojo Jr. (born 1928), Mexican writer
