= Enrique Hermitte =

Argentine geologist

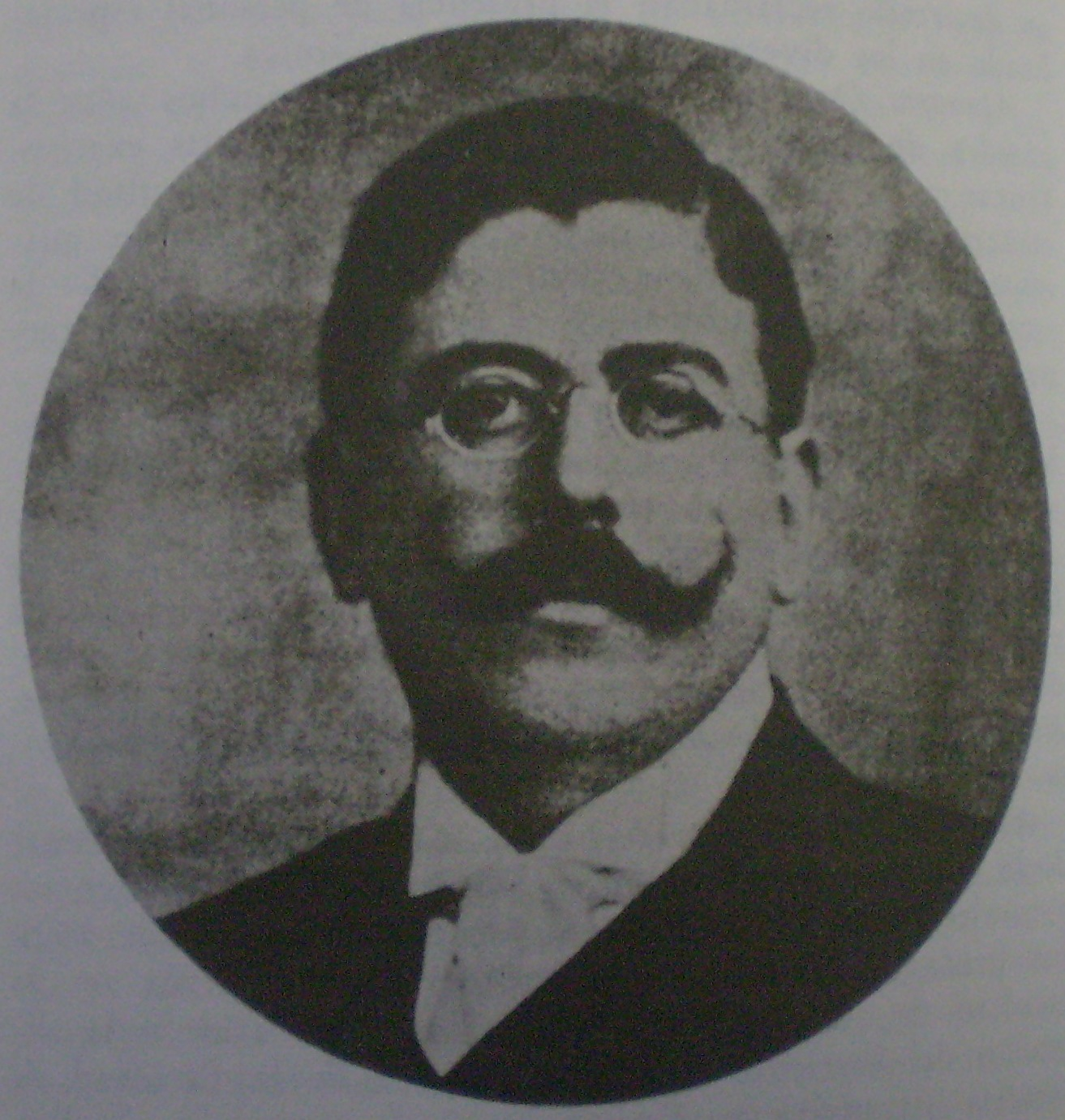
- Photo from the book "Historia Argentina" of 1971
- Born: 24 April 1871; Buenos Aires, Argentina
- Died: 28 January 1955 (aged 83); Buenos Aires, Argentina
- Education: École des Mines de Paris
- Known for: Development of geology in Argentina
- Scientific career
- Fields: Geology
- Workplaces: Servicio Geológico Minero; University of Buenos Aires

Enrique Martín Hermitte (1871-1955) was an Argentine geologist who served as the first director of Servicio Geológico Minero from its founding in 1904 to 1922. He es credited with bringing to Argentina a number of talented geologists from Europe as well as supporting young Argentine geologists by employing local university students.

European geologist brought to Argentina by Hermitte include John Keidel and Walther Penck.
