= Enrique Bacigalupo =

Argentine judge (1938–2026)

- Born: Enrique Bacigalupo Zapater; 14 July 1938; Buenos Aires, Argentina
- Died: 16 July 2026 (aged 88); Madrid, Spain
- Education: University of Buenos Aires
- Occupations: Lawyer, jurist

Enrique Bacigalupo Zapater (Note: In this Spanish name, the first or paternal surname is Bacigalupo and the second or maternal family name is Zapater.) (14 July 1938 – 16 July 2026) was an Argentine and Spanish lawyer, jurist, and professor of criminal law. Born in Argentina and educated in law at the University of Buenos Aires, he taught at the university until 1967. Briefly the Attorney of the National Treasury during the presidency of Héctor José Cámpora, Bacigalupo was forced to leave Argentina for Europe after receiving threats from the Argentine Anticommunist Alliance. He taught at the University of Bonn in West Germany until 1978, when he moved to Spain. He taught criminal law at the Complutense University of Madrid and became an advisor for the Constitutional Court of Spain. From 1987 to 2011, he served as a magistrate in the second chamber of the Supreme Court of Spain.

== Education and career ==
Bacigalupo studied law at the University of Buenos Aires, graduating with a degree in the subject in 1960 and a doctorate in the law and social sciences later; his thesis was titled Delitos impropios de omisión (transl. Unbecoming crimes of omission). He also studied under the Spanish jurist Luis Jiménez de Asúa, who lived in exile in Argentina. Bacigalupo taught at the University of Buenos Aires until resigning in 1967 and moving to Germany for five years; in 1973, he worked for 49 days as the Attorney of the National Treasury during Héctor José Cámpora's administration.

Forced to flee the country in 1974 after receiving threats from the Argentine Anticommunist Alliance due to his left-wing beliefs and activism, he lived and taught at the University of Bonn in West Germany for several years with the assistance of the Max Planck Society. While in Bonn, he was awarded a Guggenheim Fellowship in 1975 on "a theoretical basis for reform of penal codes".

Bacigalupo, believing it would be difficult for his wife to acquire German citizenship, moved to Spain in 1978. There, as his Argentine degree was not recognized, he earned a second doctorate in law and began teaching criminal law at the Complutense University of Madrid. His reputation gave him favor in his new country; Bacigalupo became an advisor for the Constitutional Court of Spain and, from there, began to work as a magistrate in the second chamber of the Supreme Court, the criminal chamber, in 1987. Notable cases he oversaw during his time with the court included the 1999 Sogecable case and a case relating to the 1981 rapeseed oil mass poisoning in Spain.

He retired in 2011 after reaching the mandatory retirement age.

After retiring as a magistrate, Bacigalupo was employed by the law firm DLA Piper to work as a partner in their Madrid offices; in 2013, he was hired as a consultant by Olswang and it was announced that he would leave DLA Piper. He and his daughter defended Argentine footballer Lionel Messi when he was charged with tax evasion in Spain.

Bacigalupo served as one of a council of eleven advisors to the Argentine president Alberto Fernández in 2020, to provide advice on Argentina's judiciary system.

== Personal life and death ==
Enrique Bacigalupo was born in Buenos Aires on 14 July 1938 to a family with Spanish ancestry. His daughter-in-law was Teresa Ribera.

After emigrating to Spain, Bacigalupo acquired Spanish citizenship. In the early 2000s, it was revealed that he had continued to draw an Argentine government pension for his time in the office, despite his short tenure. Bacigalupo resigned the pension and ANSES announced it would suspend payment in 2002.

Bacigalupo died in Madrid on 16 July 2026, two days after his 88th birthday. In the years before his death, he was a trustee of the José Ortega y Gasset Foundation.
