= José Enrique =

José Enrique is a Spanish given name. It may refer to:

- José Enrique (footballer, born 1986), Spanish footballer
- José Enrique Angulo (born 1995), Ecuadorian footballer
- José Enrique (footballer, born 1995), Spanish footballer
- José Enrique Arrarás (born 1937), Puerto Rican politician
- José Enrique Caraballo (born 1996), Venezuelan footballer
- José Enrique Cima (born 1952), Spanish cyclist
- José Enrique García (born 1967), Uruguayan footballer
- José Enrique Gutiérrez (born 1974), Spanish cyclist
- José Enrique Moyal (1910–1998), mathematical physicist and engineer
- José Enrique Pedreira (1904–1959), Puerto Rican composer
- José Enrique Peña (born 1963), Uruguayan footballer
- José Enrique Porto (born 1977), Spanish Paralympic cyclist
- José Enrique Ramírez (born 1992), Dominican Republic baseball player
- José Enrique Rodó (1872–1917), Uruguayan essayist
- José Enrique Sarabia (born 1940), Venezuelan poet, musician
- José Enrique Serrano (born 1943), American politician
- José Enrique Varela (1891–1951), Spanish military officer
