= RC flight simulator =

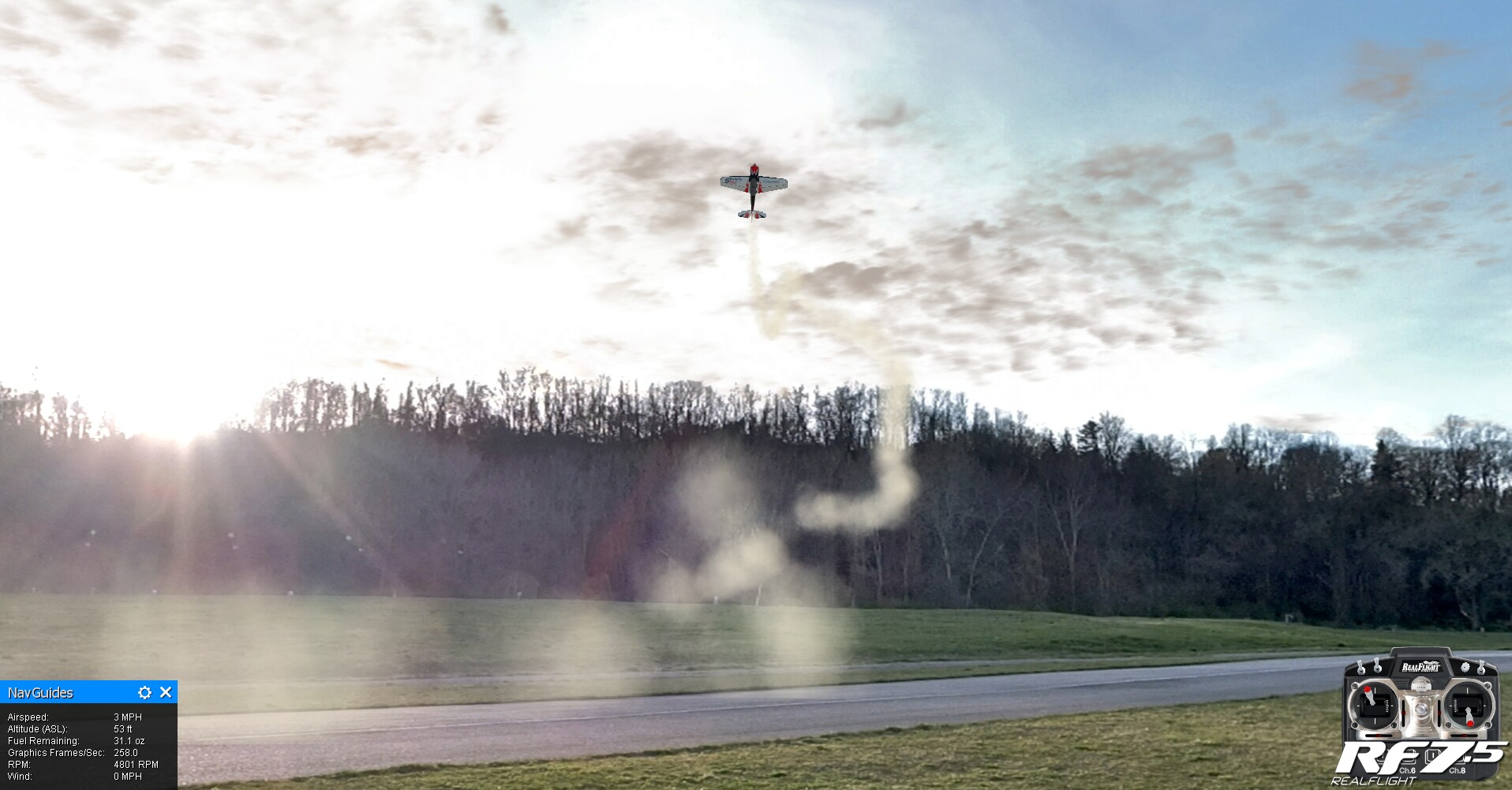
Custom flying field of the HHAMS Aerodrome created for RealFlight 7.5

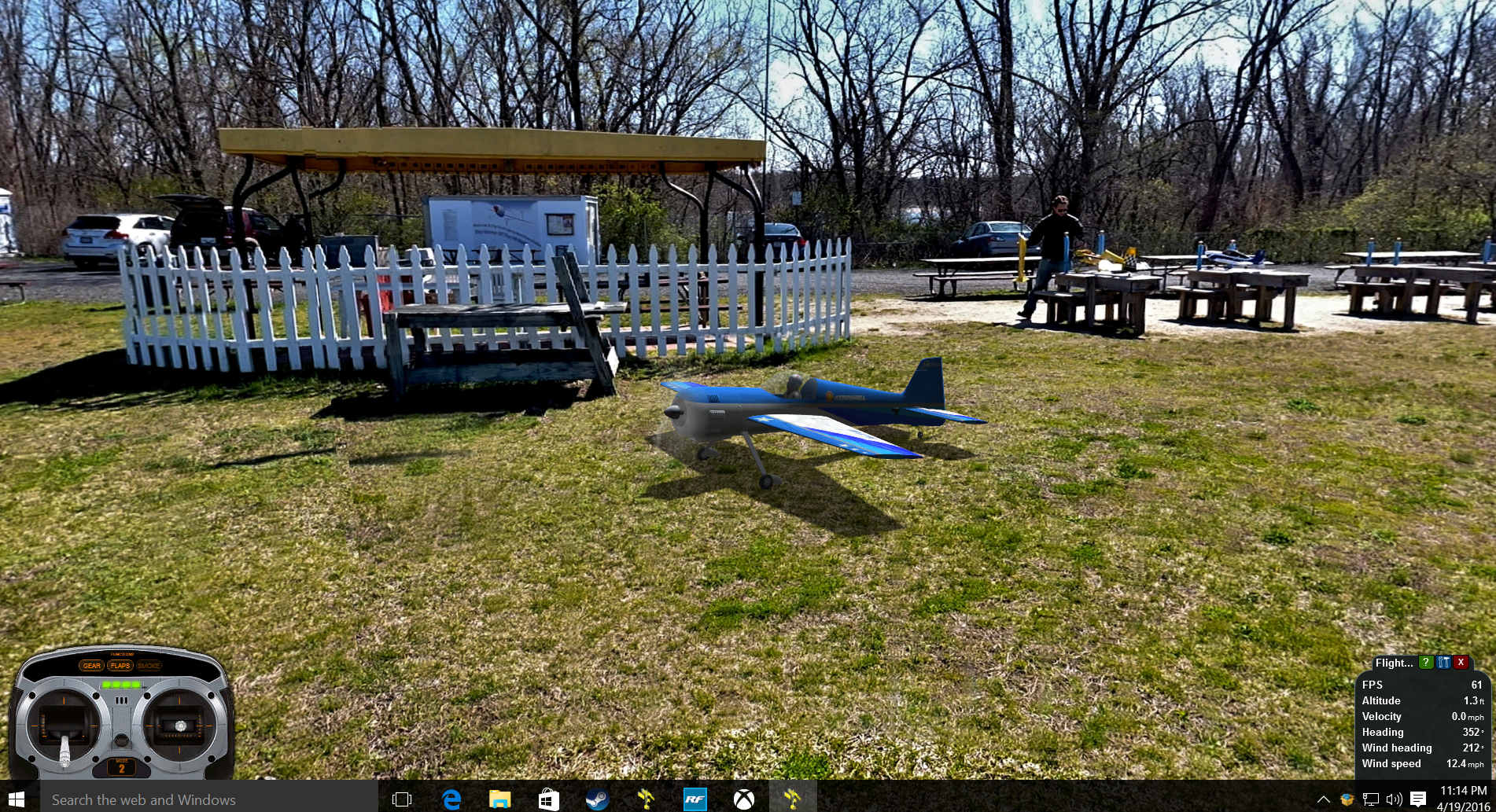
Custom flying field of the HHAMS Aerodrome created for Phoenix RC

An RC flight simulator is a computer program that allows pilots of radio-controlled aircraft to practice on a computer, without the risk and expense of damaging a real model. Besides the obvious use of training beginners, they are also used for practising new aerobatics, evaluating a model before buying it, and to allow flight practice when conditions are otherwise unsuitable. Most simulators allow the use of real R/C transmitters to control the sim.

There are a number of commercial packages available, such as Eiperle CGM's neXt - RC Flight Simulator, SVK Systems' ClearView, Knife Edge Software's RealFlight, IPACS' AeroFly and Trasna Technology's AccuRC. There are also a number of free simulators, with SeligSIM (FS One) being the most well known and most feature rich.

Most simulators allow the importing of add-ons such as new models and landscapes. There are many web sites dedicated to offering free content like this.

Some of these simulators are dedicated to R/C flight, while others are generic simulators that can simulate both full-scale and R/C flight.

== Feature Comparison ==
Name	Type of aircraft	Price	Software license	Free Demo?	Operating System	Controller Type	Last stable release (date)	External Link
Absolute RC Simulator	Model Planes and Helicopters	Free	Proprietary	Yes	iOS, Android, Windows phones and tablets	On screen controls		https://absolutesim.com/
Aerofly Professional Deluxe	Model planes and helicopters	US$300	Proprietary	No	Windows, Mac	Included or controller		http://www.aerofly.com/afpd/index.html
Aerofly RC 7	Model planes, Helicopters and Drones	€40+	Proprietary	No	Windows, Mac	Included or controller	2015-08-27	https://www.ikarus.net/en/aeroflyrc-7/rc7-features/
Aerofly RC 8	Model planes, Helicopters and Drones	€99+	Proprietary	No	Windows, Mac	Included or controller		https://www.ikarus.net/en/rc8-features/
AeroSIM RC	Model planes, helicopters, multicopters	€65	Hardware keyed	Yes	Windows	Real Controller	2019-02	http://www.aerosimrc.com/
AirSim	Multicopters, cars, etc.	Free	MIT License	Yes	Windows, Linux		2020-04	https://github.com/Microsoft/AirSim
AccuRC RC Flight Simulator	Model helicopters	US$59	Hardware keyed	Yes	Windows	Real Controller		http://www.accurc.com/
Wings	Wings and planes including FPV racing	$36	Proprietary	FPS check only	Windows	Any analog USB controller	2023-09 (1.17)	https://www.wings-sim.com/index.php
R/C Desk Pilot	Model Planes and Helicopters	Free	Freeware	n/a	Windows	Joystick	2017-06	http://www.rcdeskpilot.com/
ClearView	Model Planes and Helicopters	US$40	Proprietary	Yes	Windows,	Joystick or Controller		http://www.rcflightsim.com/
CRRCsim	Model Planes	Free	GPL	n/a	Windows, Mac, Linux	Joystick, Controllers	2018-07-04	https://sourceforge.net/projects/crrcsim/
CSM	Model Planes and Helicopters	UK£69.99	Proprietary	n/a	DOS, Windows	Real Controllers	1998 (V10)	https://web.archive.org/web/20050830000501/http://www.rcmodels.org/csm/csm_simulator.htm
Dave Brown RCFS	Model Planes and Helicopters	US$150	Proprietary	No	Windows	Joystick, Controllers		https://web.archive.org/web/20060509083404/http://www.dbproducts.com/store/rcfs2001.htm
Digital Aircraft Modeller	Model Planes	US$40	Proprietary	Yes	Windows	Joystick, controllers		http://www.digitalaircraftmodeler.com/
Electric RC Sim	Model planes, quadcopter	US$1.99	Proprietary	Yes	iOS	Touch screen controls		http://jetstripes.com/games/electric-rc-sim/
FlightGear	Planes, helicopters, model planes. (Flight simulator, not RC)	Free Flightgear#Commercial redistribution	GPL	n/a	Cross-platform	Check categories: hardware (joystick) & R/C.	2019-01-29	http://www.flightgear.org/
Flying Model Simulator	Model Planes and Helicopters	Free	Freeware	n/a	Windows	Joystick, controller adapters		http://modelsimulator.com/
FS One	Model Planes	Free	Proprietary	Yes	Windows	Real Controllers, USB Simulator Controllers	2022-09-06	https://www.fsone.com
SeligSIM (FS One)	Model Planes	Free	Proprietary	Yes	Windows	Real Controllers, USB Simulator Controllers	2025-03-25	https://www.seligsim.com
Liftoff	Drone Racing Quadcopters	US$20	Steam profile linked	No	Windows, Mac, Linux	Real controller, game controllers		http://www.liftoff-game.com
neXt - CGM RC Flight Simulator	Helicopters, Model Planes, Multicopters and Drone Racing	US$89.90	Proprietary	Yes	Windows, Mac, Linux	Real controller, game controllers	2019-12-23	https://next-sim.cgm-online.com/rc-flight-simulator_e.html
PhoenixSim	Model Planes and Helicopters	Free	Abandonware	Yes	Windows	Real Controller		https://www.rc-thoughts.com/phoenix-sim/
PicaSim	Model planes	Free	Proprietary	Yes	Windows, iOS, Android	Joystick, Controllers, Touch		http://www.rowlhouse.co.uk/PicaSim
PRE-Flight	Model Planes and Helicopters	US$25–$45	Proprietary	Yes	Windows	Real Controller		http://www.preflightsim.com/
Great Planes RealFlight	Model Planes and Helicopters	US$200	Proprietary	Yes	Windows	Real Controller		http://www.realflight.com/
Mugi Sim	Delta wing	US$1	Proprietary	Yes	Windows, iOS (iPad/iPhone/iPod Touch)	Joystick, Controllers, Touch	2019-03-27	https://baawolf.itch.io/mugi-sim
Quadcopter FX Simulator	Quadcopters	Free	Proprietary	Yes	Android, iOS	Touchscreen, Joystick, Controller		http://quadcopterfx.3dcreativeworld.com
Slope Soaring Simulator	Model planes	Free	GPL	Yes	Windows, Linux	Joystick	2006-01-21	http://www.rowlhouse.co.uk/sss/
HELI-X	Model helicopters and planes	~€60	Proprietary	Yes. Also version 0.9 is free	Windows, Linux, Mac	System Joystick, Real controllers	2020-07-01	http://www.heli-x.net/
Hover Here	Model helicopters	Free	GPLv3	n/a.	Windows, Mac	Real controller, game controllers	2022-08	https://c.web.de/@949205153511112756/P_wvdHpRRLWNn-kKtXzr7g https://github.com/zulugithub/HoverHere
X-Plane	Just about anything	US$30	Proprietary	Yes	Windows, Linux, Mac	System Joystick		http://www.x-plane.com
AlphaMacSoftware's RC Helicopter Simulator	Helicopters	Free	Proprietary	Yes	Mac	System Joystick, Real Controllers		http://www.alphamacsoftware.com/index.php
Ron's RC Flight Simulator	Electric Foamy Model Planes	Free	Ad supported	Yes	Windows, Mac, Linux, Android (Chrome or Firefox browsers only)	Logitech and Xbox Gamepads, OculusVR	2013	http://www.ostafichuk.com/rons-rc-sim/
R/C Sim Sikorsky	Helicopters	€35	Proprietary	Yes	Windows	Keyboard, Mouse, Joystick, Real Controllers		http://home.zonnet.nl/blacksphere2/rcsim.html
Reflex XTR2	Model Planes and Helicopters	€169	Proprietary	Yes	Windows	Real Controllers		https://www.reflex-sim.net
Zephyr Drone Simulator	Quadcopters/Drones	US$139.99	Proprietary	Yes	Windows, Mac	Real Controllers		https://www.zephyr-sim.com/
EreaDrone	Quadcopters/Drones	$18.99	Proprietary	No	Windows	Real Controllers, Game Controllers (Xbox, Logitech, etc)	2026-04-08 (v0.10.0cs1263)	https://www.ereadrone.com/play
VelociDrone FPV Racing Simulator	Quadcopters/Drones	£16.99	Proprietary	Yes	Windows, Mac, Linux	Real Controllers	2020-09-10 (v1.17)	https://www.velocidrone.com/
FPV FreeRider	Quadcopters/Drones	US$4.99	Proprietary	Yes	Windows, Mac, Linux, Android	USB Controllers	2019-02-05	https://itch.io/profile/fpv-freerider
Wings	Model Planes	US$36	Proprietary	No	Windows, Linux	Real Controllers, Xbox, PS4	2023-09 (1.17)	https://www.wings-sim.com
SIMNET	Multicopter, Fixed-Wing and VTOL drones	Subscription-based	Proprietary	Yes	Cross-Platform (Web-based)	Real Controllers		https://simnet.aero/
