= Enric Martínez-Castignani =

Italian-Spanish baritone (born 1970)

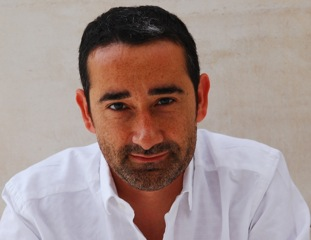

Background information
- Born: 9 June 1970 (age 56)
- Origin: Spain, Italy
- Genres: Opera, Classical
- Occupations: Musician
- Instruments: Voice: Baritone
- Website: www.emcastignani.com

Enric Martínez-Castignani (Barcelona, 1970) is an Italo-Spanish baritone who sings opera and lieder. He has been nominated for a Grammy Award.

== Biography ==
Martínez-Castignani was born to a family from Senigallia, Italy. He graduated with honours in Barcelona and from the University of Music and Performing Arts in Mannheim, Germany. His tutors included Gérard Souzay, Carlos Chausson, Dalton Baldwin, Paul Schilhawsky, Gerd Türk, Ulrich Eisenlohr and Wolfram Rieger. He studied choral and orchestral conducting under Pierre Cao, Eric Ericson, Klaus Arp and Luis Gorelick.

== Career ==
In 1992 Martínez-Castignani made his opera debut as Ottone in L’Incoronazione di Poppea. He has performed in Madrid, Barcelona, Israel, Budapest, Karlsruhe, Oviedo's Opera (Spain), Villamarta, Córdoba (Argentina), Malaga, Galicia (Spain), and at the International Festivals of Perelada and Granada, under conductors including George Pehlivanian, Alberto Zedda, Sebastian Weigle, Josep Pons, Josep R. Encinar and Álvaro Albiach.

Martínez-Castignani has given recitals at the Palau de la Música Catalana, the Auditorio de Barcelona, the Instituto Cervantes in Brussels, the Temporada de la Radio de Valparariso (Chile), and in the Suntory Hall and the Oiji Hall in Tokyo, performing several times with Dalton Baldwin.

For some years, Martínez-Castignani has been involved with some organizations working for human rights around the world.

== Roles ==
Martínez-Castignani performs several roles, among them Schaunard (La Bohème), Dandini/Don Magnifico (La Cenerentola), Il Barone di Trombock (Il viaggio a Reims), Martino (L’occasione fa il ladro), Malatesta (Don Pasquale), Enrico (Il campanello), Bartolo (The Barber of Seville), Taddeo (L'italiana in Algeri), Raimbaud (Le Comte Ory), Dulcamara (L'elisir d'amore), Figaro (The Marriage of Figaro), Papageno (The Magic Flute), Scharpless (Madame Butterfly) and Zurga (Les pêcheurs de perles).

On the concert arena he sings Bach's St Matthew Passion, St John Passion and Christmas Oratorio, Brahms' German Requiem, Mozart's Requiem, Haydn's Nelson Mass, Schubert's Die schöne Müllerin and Winterreise, and Schumann's Schwanengesang and Dichterliebe.

== Awards ==
Martínez-Castignani was nominated for a Grammy Award for the first recording of Xavier Montsalvatge’s El Gato con Botas. He was awarded the prize for the best Spanish singer in the Maria Canals International Music Competition and won the third prize in the Concurso Internacional de Budapest. He won a scholarship in the Francisco Viñas International Singing Competition.

== Discography ==
- F. Chueca: La Gran Vía / El Bateo. Deutsche Grammophon
- X. Montsalvatge: El gato con Botas. Columna Musica
- F. Schubert: Winterreise, Op. 89. Solfa Recordings
- E. Borrás: Llibre d'Amic. Columna Musica
- I. Albéniz: Arias y Romanzas. Columna Musica
- T.L. de Victoria: Lamentaciones de Jeremías. Cantus
- El Cançoner de Gandia: El Cant de la Sibil·la. Harmonia Mundi Ibérica
