= Quique Somenzini =

Quique Somenzini is a professional radio controlled aircraft pilot and designer, owner of model manufacturer QuiQue's Aircraft Company and the 2007 FAI world champion.

A native of Rio Cuarto, Argentina, Somenzini has the distinction of being the youngest competitor in the history of the FAI championships, flying in competition in 1979 at the age of twelve. His father, Mario, is a former champion as well and introduced Somenzini to the hobby of model aircraft flight at the age of nine.

Somenzini has since become one of the top R/C pilots in the world - he was Argentina's national champion 21 times - and is credited with the invention of so-called "3-D" flying, characterized by tight loops, rolls and hovers at little to no forward airspeed.

On November 18, 2007, Somenzini earned the title of FAI F3A world champion at the 25th FAI World Championship in Argentina, marking the first time he had earned the title.

In addition to his accomplishments as an R/C pilot, Somenzini is also a model aircraft designer with his own company, QuiQue's Aircraft Company of Springfield, Ohio USA where he makes his present home. He is also a product tester and sponsored pilot for Spektrum and JR, both divisions of Horizon Hobby as well as for Team RCU, the competitive arm of RCUniverse.com, a major online radio control site.

== External links and references ==
- Somenzini's bio at RCUniverse.com
- Article on Somenzini's FAI win at Spektrumrc.com
