= Nelida Fuccaro =

Nelida Fuccaro is a historian and professor of modern Middle Eastern history at the New York University Abu Dhabi.

She has worked and published extensively on the History of the Modern Iraqi State, with a particular focus on the Yazidi, and Kurdish populations of the country. Fuccaro has also published on the history of modern Bahrain. She currently works on the social and cultural history of the Middle Eastern oil industry and has edited a thematic contribution for Comparative Studies in South Asia, Africa and the Middle East entitled Histories of Oil and Urban Modernity in the Middle East. She had previously taught at the School of Oriental and African Studies and the University of Exeter.

== Selected publications ==
=== Books ===
- Fuccaro, Nelida (2011) Öteki Kürtler. Sömürge Irak’inda Yazidiler (Turkish translation of The Other Kurds: Yazidis in Colonial Iraq). Istanbul: Boğaziçi Gösteri Sanatları Topluluğu.
- Fuccaro, Nelida (2009) Histories of City and State in the Persian Gulf: Manama since 1800. Cambridge: Cambridge University Press. (Cambridge Middle East Studies)
- Fuccaro, Nelida (1999) The Other Kurds: Yazidis in Colonial Iraq. London: IB Tauris.

=== Other selected publications ===
- Fuccaro, Nelida (2011) 'The Ottoman Frontier in Kurdistan in the Sixteenth and Seventeenth Centuries.' In: Woodhead, Christine, (ed.), The Ottoman World. London: Routledge, pp. 237–250. (Routledge Worlds)
- Fuccaro, Nelida (2010) 'Pearl Towns and early Oil Cities: Migration and Integration in the Arab Coast of the Persian Gulf.' In: Freitag, Ulrike and Furhmann, Malte and Lafi, Nora and Riedler, Florian, (eds.), Migration and the Making of Urban Modernity in the Ottoman Empire and Beyond. London: Routledge, pp. 99–116.
- Fuccaro, Nelida (2008) 'Between imara, empire and oil: Saudis in the frontier society of the Persian Gulf.' In: Al-Rasheed, M., (ed.), Kingdom without Borders: Saudi Political, Religious and Media Frontiers. London: Hurst, pp. 39–64.
- Fuccaro, Nelida (2005) 'Mapping the Transnational Community: Persians and the Space of the City in Bahrain, c. 1869-1937.' In: Al-Rasheed, M., (ed.), Transnational Connections and the Arab Gulf. Routledge, pp. 39–58.
- Fuccaro, Nelida (2004) 'Minorities and Ethnic Mobilisation: The Kurds in Northern Iraq and Syria.' In: Meouchy, N. and Sluggett, P., (eds.), The British and French Mandates in Comparative Perspectives. Brill, pp. 579–595.
- Fuccaro, Nelida (1994) Aspects of the social and political history of the Yazidi enclave of Jabal Sinjar (Iraq) under the British mandate, 1919-1932, Durham theses, Durham University.
