= Enric Casadevall Medrano =

Andorran politician

Enric Casadevall Medrano is an Andorran politician. He is a member of the Liberal Party of Andorra and Mayor of Canillo.
