= Nélida María Bacigalupo =

Argentinian botanist (1924–2019)

- Born: 1924
- Died: 2019 (aged 94–95)
- Education: National University of La Plata
- Occupations: Botanist, curator, professor

Nélida María Bacigalupo (1924–2019) was an Argentine botanist, curator, and professor. She studied at the National University of La Plata, and in 1953, she received her doctorate in Natural Sciences at the same university. She served as an investigator at the Instituto de Botánica Darwinion, San Isidro, Buenos Aires. Bacigalupo did her botanical research in Paraguay and Argentina. She was a world authority on the family Rubiaceae. She was a member of the Argentine Botanical Society, and was the honorary vice-president of the 33rd Argentine Botany Conference in 2011.

== Honors ==
- 2007, Mujer ejemplar de San Isidro

== Selected publications ==
The standard author abbreviation Bacigalupo is used to indicate this person as the author when citing a botanical name.

- Zulma E. Rúgolo de Agrasar, Nélida B. Bacigalupo. Maevia Noemí Correa (1914–2005). Darwiniana 43 (1–4): 281–285. January/December de 2005, [cited 17 October 2009]. Available online ISSN 0011-6793
- 1952–1954. Las especies argentinas de los géneros Psychotria, Palicourea y Rudgec (Rubiaceoe). Darwiniana 10 (1): 31–64
- M.N. Correa. Orchidaceae. En NM Bacigalupo (ed.) Flora Ilustrada de Entre Ríos. Colec. Cient. INTA. 5 (1)
- Arturo Erhardo Burkart, Nélida M. Bacigalupo. 2005. Flora ilustrada de Entre Rios (Argentina). Vol. 6 de Colección científica. Parte 4 de Flora ilustrada de Entre Ríos. Instituto Nacional de Tecnología Agropecuaria. 627 pp.
- Nélida M. Bacigalupo. 1996. Flora del valle de Lerma: Rubiaceae Juss. Vol. 4, Nº 3 de Aportes botánicos de Salta. Serie Flora. Herbario MCNS, Facultad de Ciencias Naturales, Universidad Nacional de Salta. 52 pp.
- Nélida M. Bacigalupo, Ángel Lulio Cabrera. 1993. Verbenáceas a Caliceráceas. Vol. 13 de Colección científica del INTA. Parte 9 de Flora de la Provincia de Jujuy : República Argentina. Colec. Cient. INTA. 560 pp.
- Delia Añón Suárez, Nélida M. Bacigalupo, Ángel V. Borrello. 1968. Pteridófitas – Gimnospermas y Monocotiledóneas (excepto Gramineas). Vol. 1 de Flora de la Provincia de Buenos Aires. Vol. 4 de Colec. Cient. INTA. 623 pp.
- Nélida María Bacigalupo, Ana María Cialdella. 1956. Callitrichaceae. En Flora patagónica 6 : 396 – 402
