= Expedition of the Thousand =

Event part of the Italian unification, 1860

- Part of the wars of Italian unification
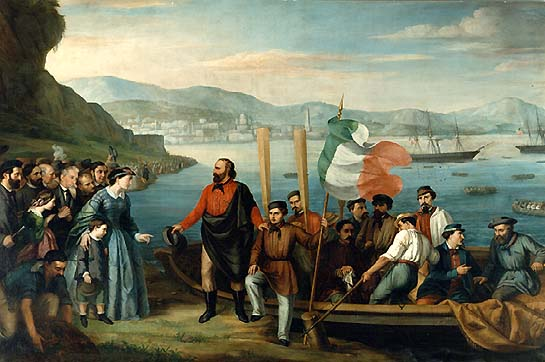
- The beginning of the expedition at Quarto al Mare, Genoa
| Date | 5 May 1860 – 26 October 1860 |
| Location | Southern Italy |
| Result | Garibaldine victory: Conquest of Southern Italy; Collapse of the Kingdom of the Two Sicilies; Papal States reduced to Lazio; Proclamation of the Kingdom of Italy; Post-Unification Italian Brigandage |
| Territorial changes | Southern Italy, Marche and Umbria annexed by the Kingdom of Piedmont-Sardinia |

Belligerents
| Redshirts; Supported by: (Kingdom of Sardinia) Piedmont-Sardinia | (Kingdom of the Two Sicilies) Two Sicilies; Supported by: Papal States |

Commanders and leaders
| Giuseppe Garibaldi; Giacomo Medici; Enrico Cosenz (Kingdom of Sardinia) Victor Emmanuel II | (Kingdom of the Two Sicilies) Francis II (Kingdom of the Two Sicilies) Giosuè Ritucci (Kingdom of the Two Sicilies) Francesco Landi (Kingdom of the Two Sicilies) Ferdinando Bosco (Kingdom of the Two Sicilies) Ferdinando Lanza (surrendered) |

Strength
| 1,162 at the departure from Quarto al Mare; 50,000 after the Battle of the Volturno | 90,000 |

Casualties and losses
| Unknown | Unknown |

The Expedition of the Thousand (Italian: Spedizione dei Mille) was an event of the unification of Italy that took place in 1860. A corps of volunteers led by Giuseppe Garibaldi sailed from Quarto al Mare near Genoa and landed in Marsala, Sicily, in order to conquer the Kingdom of the Two Sicilies, ruled by the Spanish House of Bourbon-Two Sicilies. The name of the expedition derives from the initial number of participants, which was around 1,000 people.

The Garibaldians, with the contribution of southern volunteers and reinforcements to the expedition, increased in number, creating the Southern Army. After a campaign of a few months with some victorious battles against the Bourbon army, the Thousand and the newborn southern army managed to conquer the entire Kingdom of the Two Sicilies. The expedition was a success and concluded with a plebiscite that brought Naples and Sicily into the Kingdom of Piedmont-Sardinia, the last territorial conquest before the proclamation of the Kingdom of Italy on 17 March 1861.

The Expedition of the Thousand was the only desired action that was jointly decided by the four "Fathers of the Fatherland": Giuseppe Mazzini, Giuseppe Garibaldi, King Victor Emmanuel II, and Camillo Benso, Count of Cavour, pursuing divergent goals. Mazzini, of republican political belief, wanted to liberate Southern Italy and Rome, while Garibaldi wanted to conquer, in the name of Victor Emmanuel II, the Kingdom of the Two Sicilies and continue towards Rome to complete the Italian unification, while Cavour wanted to prevent the conquest of Rome to avoid a conflict with his French ally, Napoleon III, who protected the Papal States.

The project was an ambitious and risky venture aiming to conquer, with one thousand men, a kingdom with a larger regular army and a more powerful navy. The various groups participated in the expedition for a variety of reasons: for Garibaldi, it was to achieve a united Italy; for the Sicilian bourgeoisie, an independent Sicily as part of the Kingdom of Italy, and for common people, land distribution and the end of oppression. The Expedition was instigated by Francesco Crispi, who utilized his political influence to bolster the Italian unification project.

== Background ==
=== Political context ===
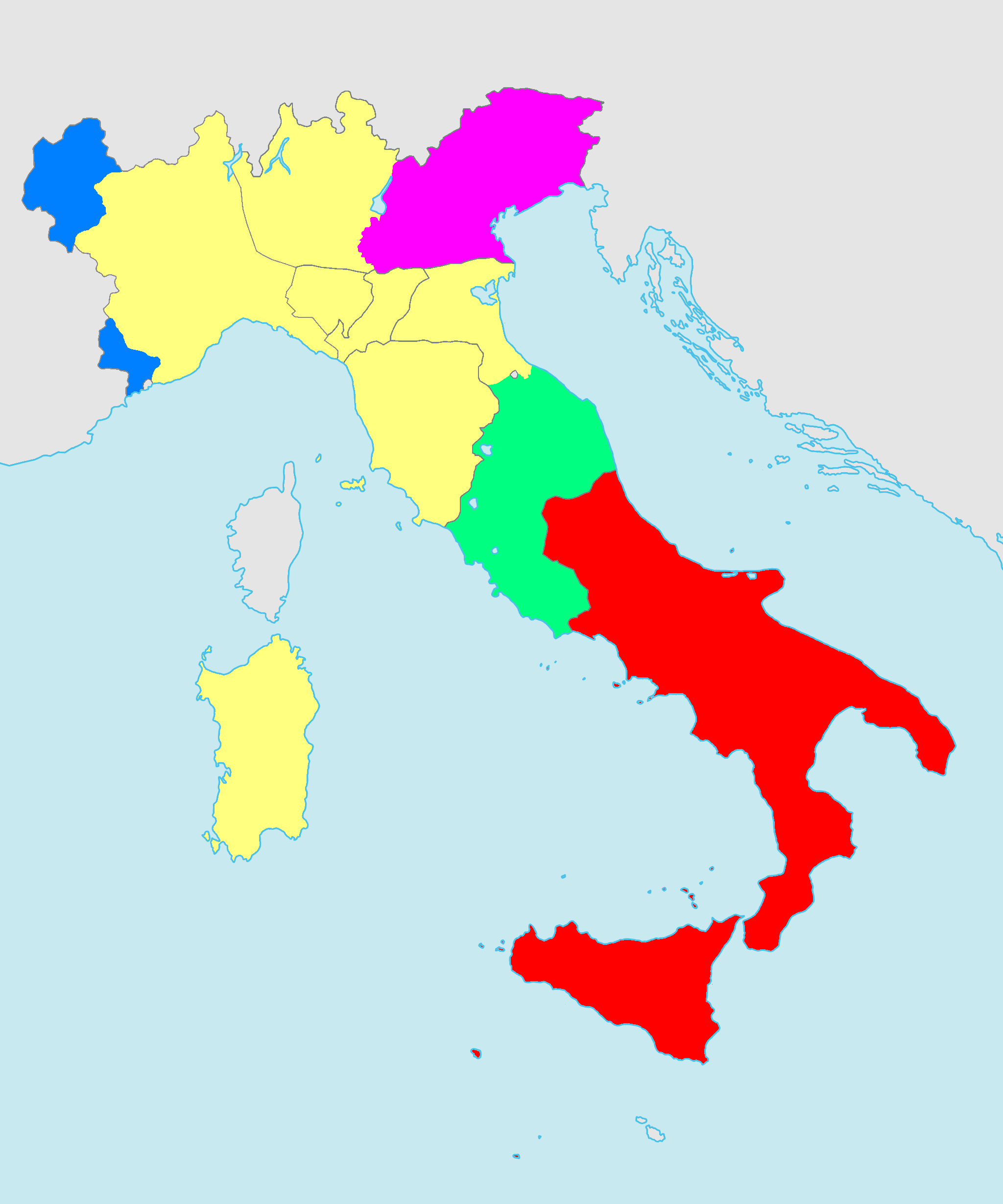
Italy in March 1860 (still visible the borders of 1859) Duchy of Savoy and the County of Nice, ceded to France from the Kingdom of Piedmont-Sardinia following the Treaty of Turin (1860) Kingdom of Piedmont-Sardinia Kingdom of Lombardy–Venetia Papal States Kingdom of the Two Sicilies

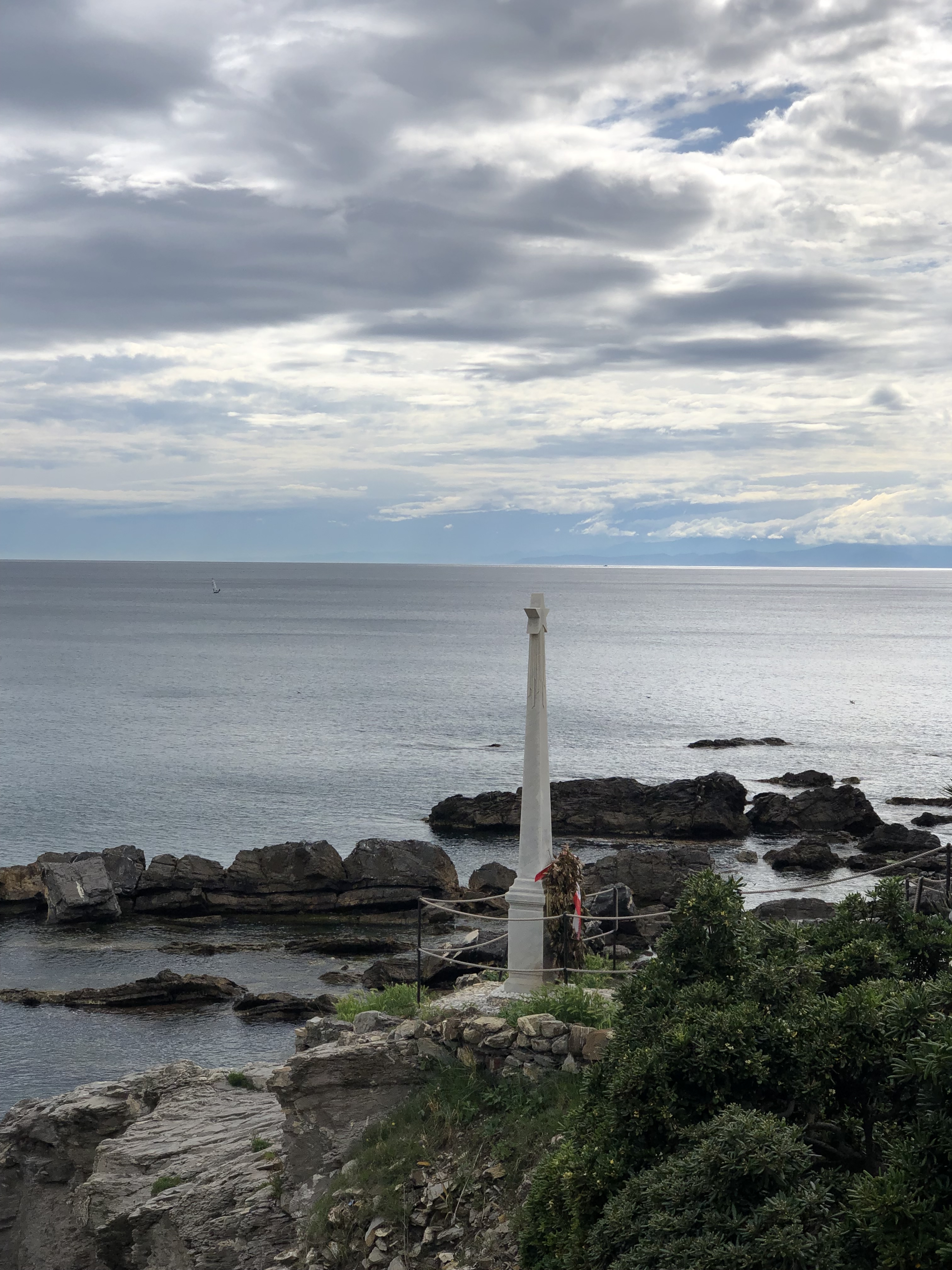
Monumental obelisk on the rock (Scoglio dei Mille) at Quarto al Mare (5.6 km south-east of the Old Port of Genoa), from which the Expedition of the Thousand departed on the night of 5 May 1860. On top of the monument is placed the Stella d'Italia ("Star of Italy").

Since the fall of the Western Roman Empire, the Italian Peninsula was divided into a multitude of small independent states. The French Revolution and the constitution of the Cisalpine Republic and of the Napoleonic Kingdom of Italy gave birth to a political movement aimed at national reunification. Insurrectional movements aimed at national self-determination were therefore born. Some of them were viewed favorably by the Kingdom of Piedmont-Sardinia which took the lead in the movement for the political unification of the peninsula.

The Expedition took place within the overall process of the unification of Italy, which was largely orchestrated by Cavour, Prime Minister of Piedmont-Sardinia, as his life's work. The Second Italian War of Independence ended on 11 July 1859; the terms of the armistice of Villafranca, wanted by Napoleon III, which recognized Lombardy (with the exclusion of Mantua) to the Kingdom of Piedmont-Sardinia, but left Venice and all of Veneto in Austrian hands, had created discontent among a large part of the Italian patriots.

Already since May 1859 the populations of the Grand Duchy of Tuscany, of the Delegation of Romagna (Bologna, Ferrara, Ravenna and Forlì), of the Duchy of Modena and of the Duchy of Parma had expelled their sovereigns and requested annexation to the Kingdom of Piedmont-Sardinia, while the papal government had regained full possession of Umbria and the Marche, whose populations suffered harsh repression, culminating on 20 June 1859 in the bloody massacres of Perugia by the papal Swiss troops in the service of Pope Pius IX.

Napoleon III and Cavour were mutually indebted because he had withdrawn from the Second Italian War of Independence before the expected conquest of Veneto, and because he had allowed the uprisings to spread to the territories of central-northern Italy, thus going beyond what was agreed with the Plombières Agreement.

The political stalemate was resolved on 24 March 1860, when Cavour signed the cession of the Duchy of Savoy and the County of Nice to France with the Treaty of Turin (1860), obtaining in exchange the consent of the French emperor to the annexation of Tuscany and Emilia-Romagna to the Kingdom of Piedmont-Sardinia. After the annexation of the Grand Duchy of Tuscany, the Duchies of Modena and Parma and the Romagna to the Kingdom of Piedmont-Sardinia in March 1860, Italian patriots set their sights on the Kingdom of the Two Sicilies, which comprised all of southern mainland Italy and Sicily, as the next step toward their dream of unification of all Italian lands.

As regard to the interests of foreign powers, the United Kingdom supported the Kingdom of Piedmont-Sardinia to counter French policy in the Italian peninsula. In fact, the United Kingdom, which together with France dominated North Africa, did not want Napoleon III to extend his influence on the Italian peninsula to have greater control of the Mediterranean Sea. Instead, the other more reactionary European powers such as Spain, the Austrian Empire and Russian Empire took the side of the Kingdom of the Two Sicilies, but maintained a wait-and-see attitude. In such a divided Europe, the Kingdom of the Two Sicilies found itself rather isolated and could only count on its own forces.

The Kingdom of the Two Sicilies was led by a young and inexperienced monarch (Francis II of the Two Sicilies, who succeeded his father Ferdinand II only on 22 May 1859, less than one year before the expedition). In 1836, the Kingdom of the Two Sicilies had worsened relations with the United Kingdom, to which it had owed its survival during the Napoleonic period, with the "sulphur question". Finally, the Kingdom of the Two Sicilies had fallen into a sort of diplomatic isolation as it had in fact refused to participate in the Crimean War alongside France and the United Kingdom, alongside which the Kingdom of Piedmont-Sardinia had instead participated.

When the idea of a conference regarding the reorganization of Italy following recent events circulated in European diplomatic circles in late 1859, Francis II proved indifferent, not taking the opportunity to show an active presence internationally. In 1860, Giuseppe Garibaldi, already the most famous Italian revolutionary leader, was in Genoa planning an expedition against Sicily and Naples, with the covert support of the United Kingdom. Lorenzo del Boca suggested that British support for Garibaldi's expedition was spurred by the necessity to obtain more favourable economic conditions for Sicilian sulfur, which was needed in great quantities for munitions.

Garibaldi, although close to republican and revolutionary circles, had already been in contact with King Victor Emmanuel II for some time to organize the Expedition of the Thousand. Despite his republican ideas, he agreed to collaborate with the House of Savoy until national unity was achieved; the contingencies are such that even the republican Giuseppe Mazzini wrote: "It is no longer a question of republic or monarchy: it is a question of national unity... to be or not to be".

=== Sicilian independentism ===
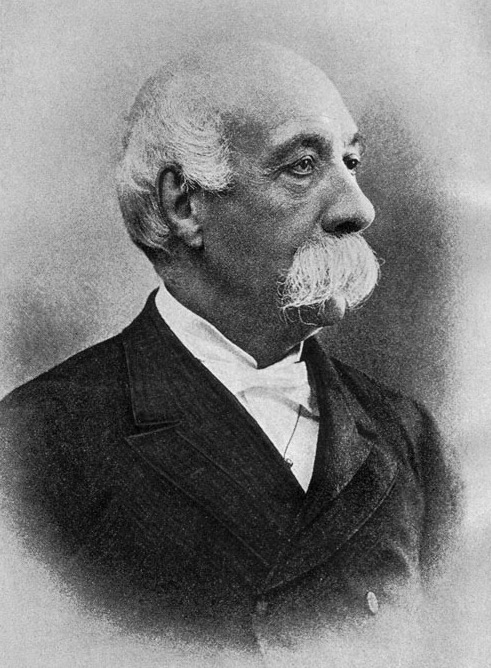
Francesco Crispi, one of the architects of Italian unification

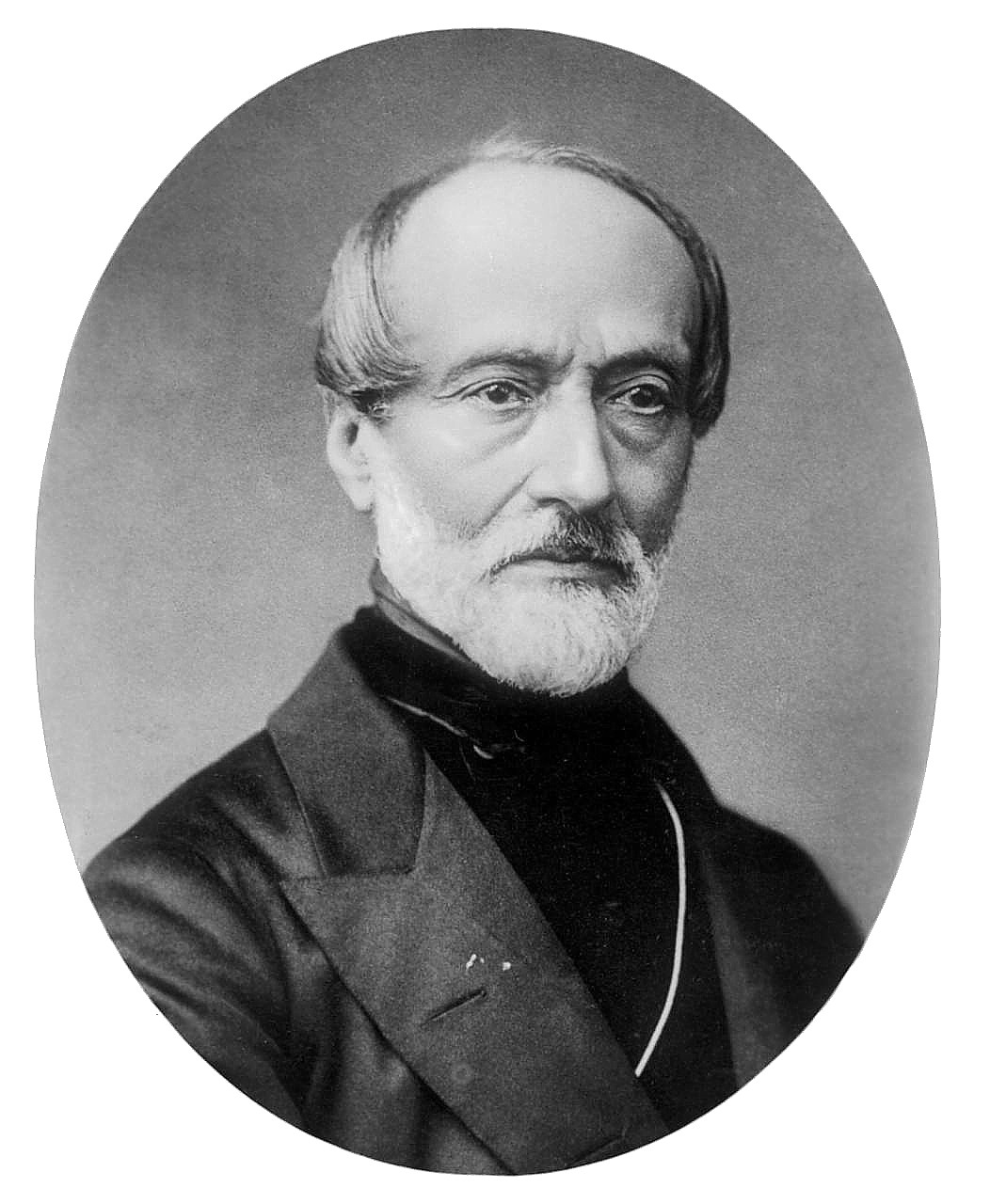
Giuseppe Mazzini, highly influential leader of the Italian revolutionary and activist for the unification of Italy movement

In 1860 the only force opposed to the Bourbons that proved willing to take up arms was Sicilian independentism. The memory of the long revolution of 1848 was still alive on the island, where the repression by the Bourbons was particularly harsh. Subsequently, the Bourbon government's attempts to reach a political solution were unsuccessful. Intolerance, even in urban and rural populations that associated with the Risorgimento was common, as evidenced by their belonging to the ranks of Giuseppe Garibaldi volunteers from Marsala to Messina, up until the Battle of the Volturno.

Many leading cadres of the 1848 revolution (including Rosolino Pilo and Francesco Crispi) fled to Turin. They participated in the Second Italian War of Independence and adopted a decidedly liberal and unitary political position. It is these follower of Giuseppe Mazzini who see, in insurrectional Sicily, in Garibaldi's intervention and in the House of Savoy, the fundamental elements for the success of the unification cause. On 2 March 1860, Giuseppe Mazzini wrote a letter inciting the Sicilians to rebel, declaring: "Garibaldi must come".

At the beginning of March, Rosolino Pilo turned to Garibaldi, first asking him for weapons, then inviting him to intervene directly. Garibaldi considered any revolutionary movement that did not have a good chance of success to be inappropriate. He wanted to lead the revolution if the people asked him to, and in the name of King Victor Emmanuel II. With the help of the local populations and the support of Piedmont, Garibaldi managed to avoid failures similar to those of the previous actions of the Bandiera brothers and Carlo Pisacane.

Despite not receiving Garibaldi's support, Pilo traveled to Sicily on 25 March with the intention of preparing the ground for a future expedition. Accompanied by Giovanni Corrao, also a follower of Mazzini, Pilo arrived in Messina and immediately made contact with representatives of the most important families. In this way he obtained the support of the landowners. In fact, once the expeditionary force had landed, the barons made their gangs (the picciotti) available. Pilo was killed in a clash on 21 May 1860.

=== Internal situation of the Kingdom of the Two Sicilies ===
Flag of the Kingdom of the Two Sicilies until 1860

In the first half of the 19th century, several revolts broke out in the Kingdom of the Two Sicilies, all repressed by the Bourbons. There was the insurrection of 1820–24, the Calabrian revolution of 1847, the Sicilian independence revolution of 1848, the Calabrian insurrection of the same year, and the constitutional movement of Naples, also in 1848.

From a military point of view, it is essential for the Two Sicilies to maintain close ties with the Austrian Empire. Twice the Bourbons regained the throne due to the intervention of the Austrian armies. In 1815, the Austrian Frederick Bianchi, Duke of Casalanza, defeated the army of Gioacchino Murat, Napoleon's brother-in-law, during the battle of Tolentino and, in 1821, the Austrian Johann Maria Philipp Frimont defeated Guglielmo Pepe's troops during the battles of Rieti and the battle of Rieti-Antrodoco.

In 1860, however, the situation seemed much more favorable to the Bourbons. From 1821, the army received constant funding from the regime and was reinforced by units made up of foreigners (especially Swiss) who appeared loyal to the ruling house.

The populations of the provinces of the peninsular part are generally close to the Bourbon dynasty, as demonstrated by the success of the Sanfedist movement which overthrew the Parthenopean Republic in 1799 by massacring the Jacobins of the Kingdom of Naples, as well as the anti-French of the period 1806–15.

=== Gancia revolt ===
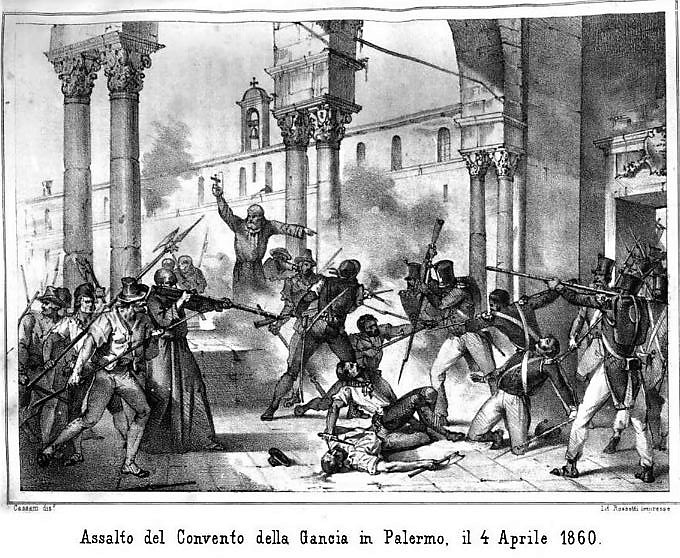
Attack on the Gancia convent, Palermo, 4 April 1860

The revolt began on 4 April in Palermo with an episode that was immediately repressed whose protagonists, on the field, were Francesco Riso and, far from the theater of the operation, Francesco Crispi, who coordinated the action of the Genoese rebels. Despite the failure, the action gave rise to a series of demonstrations and insurrections, including Rosolino Pilo's march from Messina to Piana dei Greci from 10 to 20 April. To those, Rosolino Pilo met along the way he announced that they would have to be ready "for Garibaldi's arrival".

The news of the revolt was confirmed on the continent by an encrypted telegram sent by Nicola Fabrizi on 27 April. The content of the message was not at all encouraging and increased Giuseppe Garibaldi's uncertainty to the point that he initially gave up on the idea of an expedition. Francesco Crispi, who had decoded the telegram, claimed to have been wrong and provided a new version, probably falsified, which convinced Garibaldi to undertake the expedition.

=== Role of Cavour ===
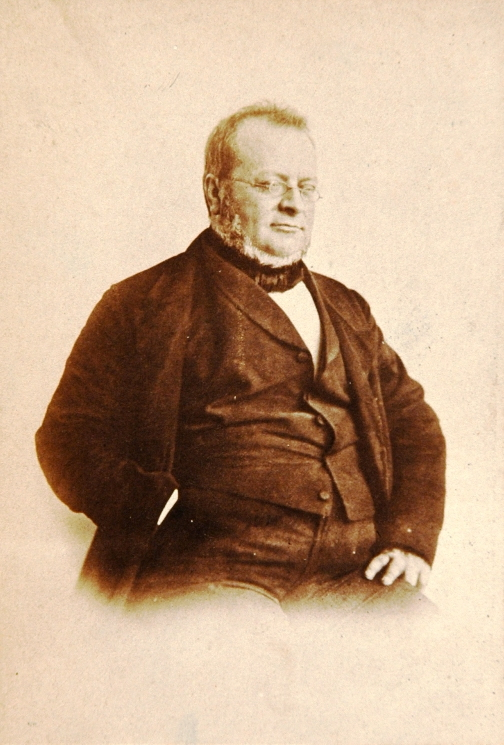
Camillo Benso, Count of Cavour, the first prime minister of unified Italy

Cavour considered the expedition risky. He feared that it would damage relations with France, especially because he suspected that Giuseppe Garibaldi was targeting Rome. However, since his prestige was undermined by the transfer of Savoy and Nice, he did not consider himself in a position to express his dissent.

For Cavour Garibaldi represented an "opportunity", because through him it was possible to trigger an internal revolt in the Two Sicilies which would have forced the Kingdom of Piedmont-Sardinia to take measures to guarantee public order. Cavour therefore decided to wait and observe the evolution of events, to grasp any favorable developments in Piedmont; it was only when the chances of success of the expedition were significant that Cavour openly supported the initiative.

With this in mind, on 18 April Cavour sent two warships to Sicily; the Governolo and the Authion. Officially their presence aimed to guarantee the protection of the Piedmontese citizens present on the island but, in reality, they had to accurately evaluate the forces at play. At the same time, Cavour managed, through Giuseppe La Farina (sent after the landing in Sicily to monitor and maintain contact with Garibaldi), to follow all the preparatory phases of the expedition. The definitive agreements between Cavour and King Victor Emmanuel II were concluded during a meeting in Bologna on 2 May. Cavour accepted that the government, with caution, would help Garibaldi in the expedition.

=== Search for a casus belli ===
The Kingdom of Piedmont-Sardinia needed a presentable casus belli in order to attack the Kingdom of the Two Sicilies. This was needed for the House of Savoy, which however never gave any declaration of war against the Bourbon kingdom, a necessary condition since this was among the requirements presented to Cavour. In fact, Cavour always presented himself as an instrument for maintaining order among the European powers. The only occurrence that would have satisfied this requirement was an uprising from within. Such an event would have felt the alienation of the people from the dynasty that ruled in Naples and, particularly, the inability of Francis II of the Two Sicilies, to exercise government in his domains.

Sicily, as shown by the history of the past decades, was fertile ground, and the liberal south, especially those returning after an amnesty granted by the young king, who worked in this direction for some time. Meanwhile the organization of the expeditionary force was in full swing. Garibaldi, fresh from the brilliant Lombardy campaign with the Hunters of the Alps, had demonstrated his abilities as a military leader, facing a regular army with a light army made up of volunteers. Also for this expedition he would have resorted to enlisting volunteers willing to fight under his leadership.

== The expedition ==
=== Departure and journey ===
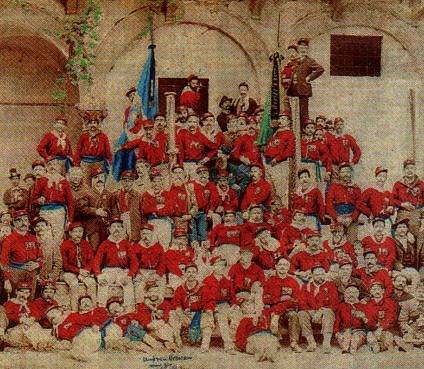
Redshirts volunteers of the Thousand from Brescia, Lombardy (1860), hand-colored

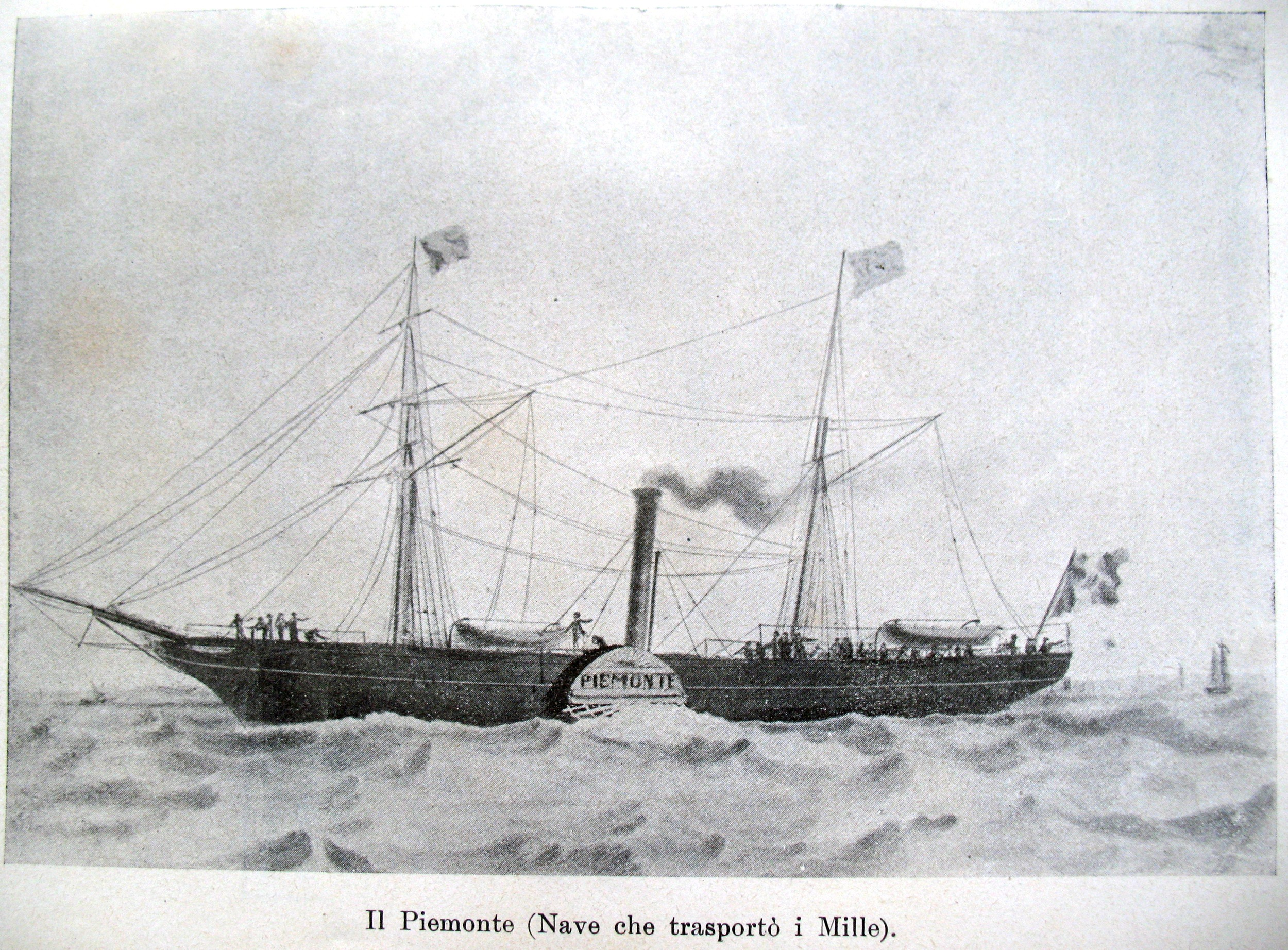
The steamship Il Piemonte, one of the two steamships, that transported the Thousand to Sicily

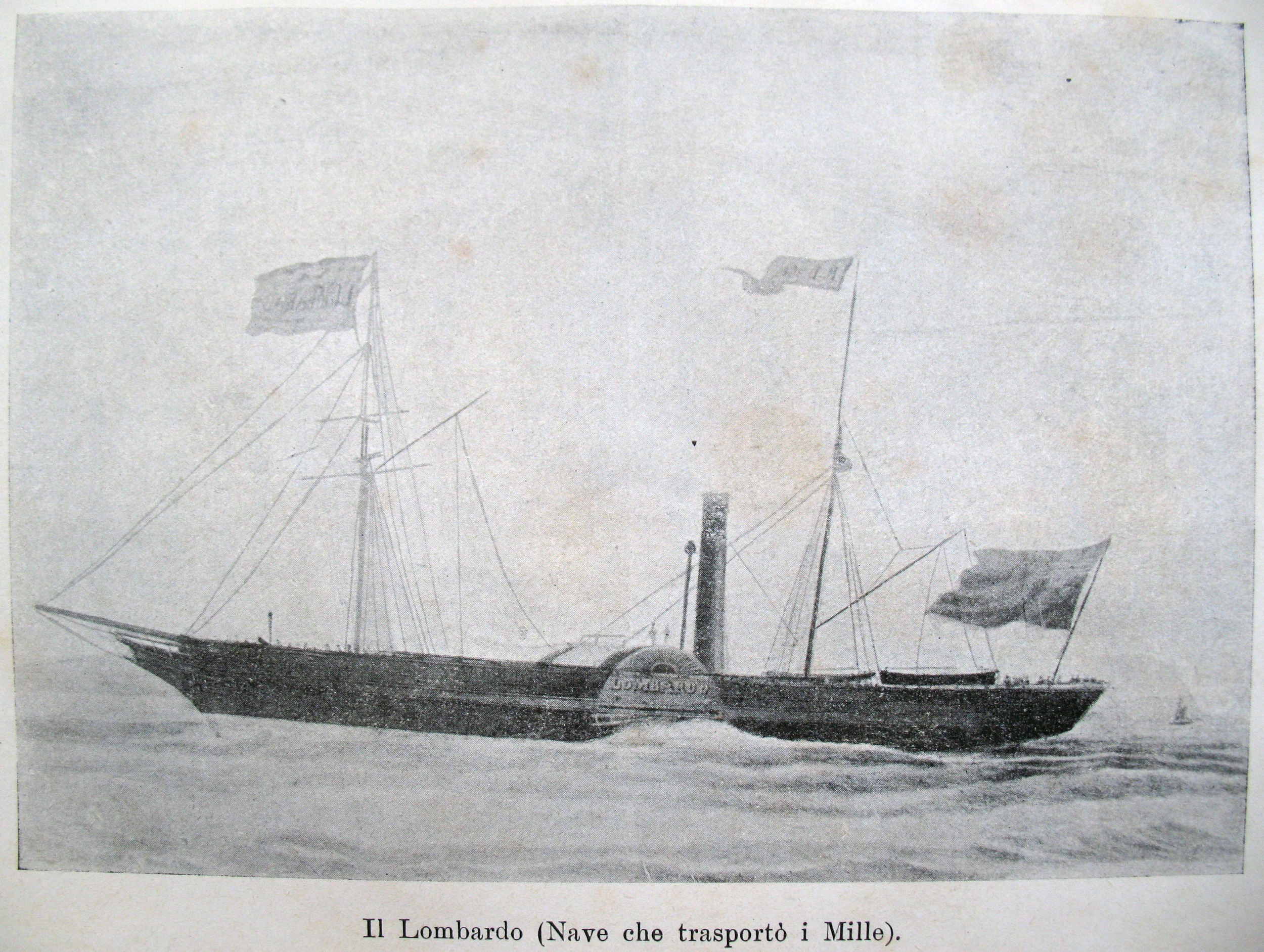
The steamship Il Lombardo, the other steamship that transported the Thousand to Sicily

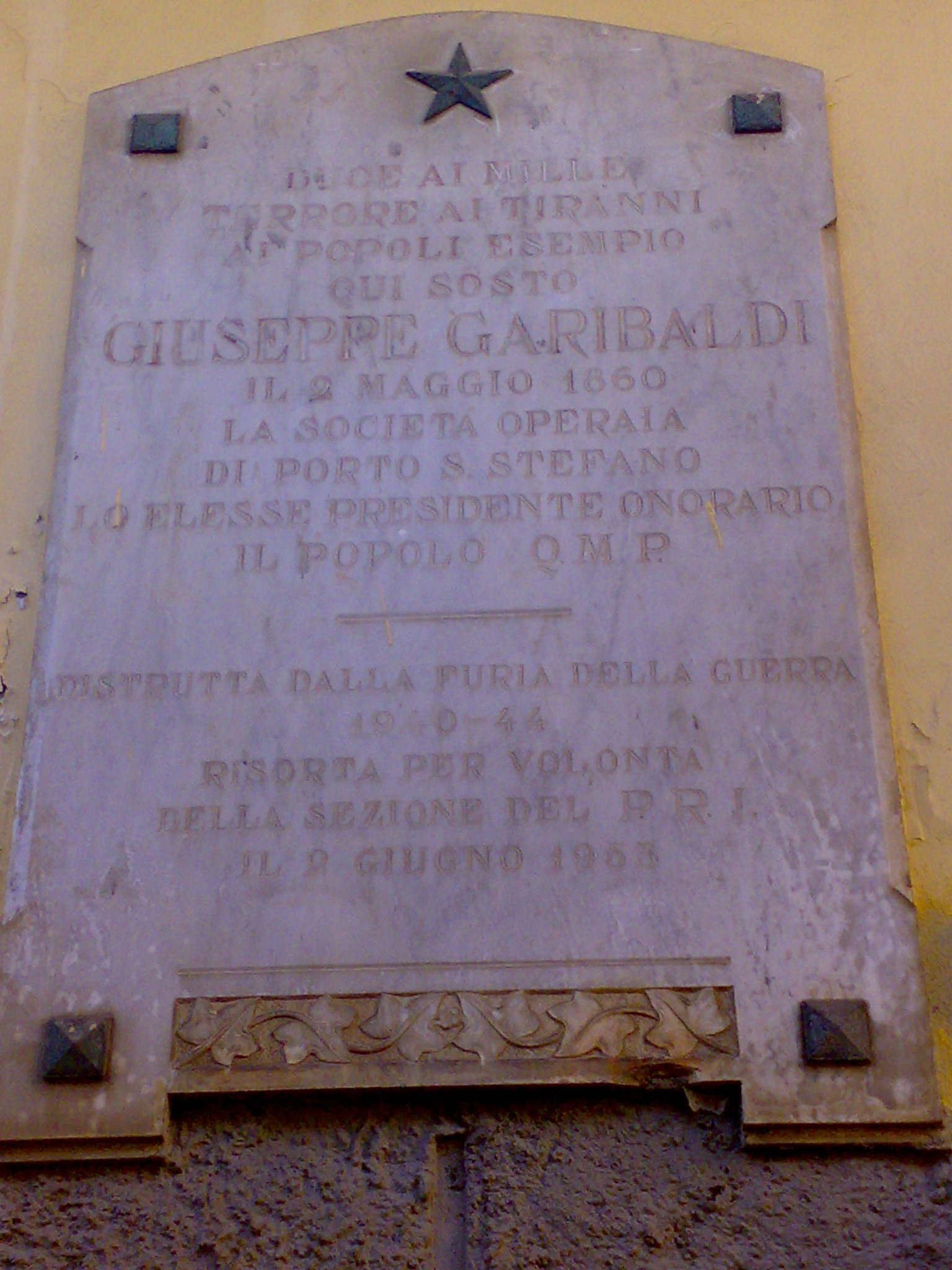
Plaque in memory of the presence of the Thousand in Porto Santo Stefano on 9 May 1860

In March 1860, exile Rosolino Pilo exhorted Giuseppe Garibaldi to take charge of an expedition to liberate southern Italy from Bourbon rule. Garibaldi was against it at first, but eventually agreed. The expeditionary force was in full preparation and was organizing itself publicly throughout the Italian peninsula. Agostino Bertani, Giovanni Acerbi, Giuseppe Guerzoni and Nino Bixio were active in Genoa, and Giuseppe Missori and Giuseppe Sirtori in Lombardy. By May 1860, Garibaldi had collected 1,089 volunteers for his expedition to Sicily.

A total of 336 volunteers came from the contemporary Italian regions, including Genoa (156 volunteers), Tuscany (78 volunteers), Sicily (45 volunteers), Naples (46 volunteers), with only 11 from Rome and the Papal States. The largest number of volunteers came from Austrian Lombardy and Venetia, with 434 from Lombardy and 194 from Venetia. An additional 33 foreign volunteers joined the expedition. This included 14 ethnic Italians from the Trentino region of Austria, as well as István Türr and three other Hungarians. The volunteers came from middle-class backgrounds, with the vast majority being students and skilled craftsmen.

The 1,089 volunteers were unfavorably armed with obsolete muskets, and wore red shirts and grey trousers as their uniform. Thus they became known as the Redshirts. The Redshirts were very popular and influenced many armies worldwide. For example, during the American Civil War, the Union's Garibaldi Guard and its Confederate counterpart, the Garibaldi Legion, wore red shirts as a part of their uniforms.

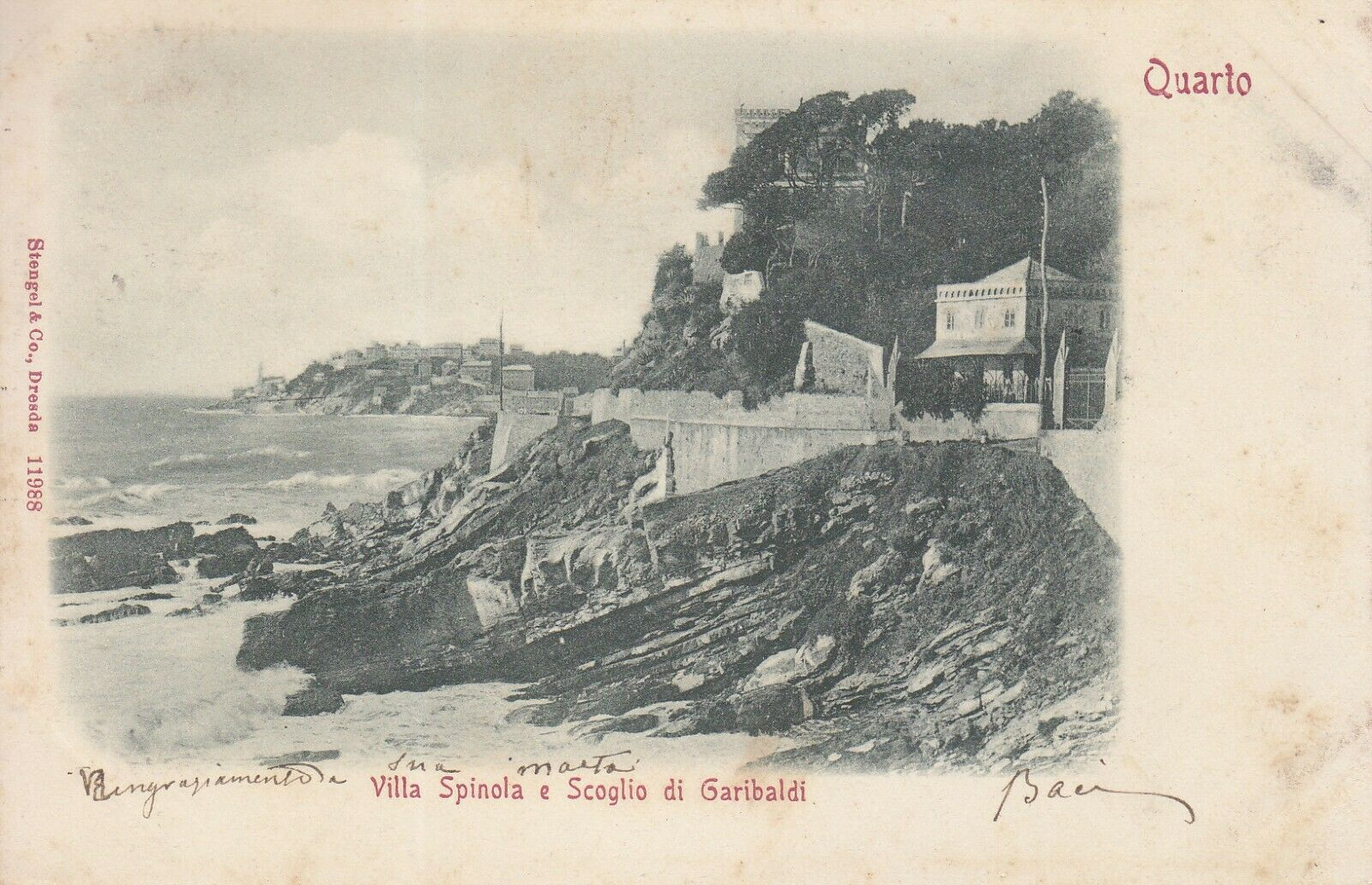
Villa Spinola, the HQ of Garibaldi, and the Scoglio dei Mille rock in front of it from which the expedition embarked on 5 May 1860. Postcard 1900

During the night of 5 May, a small group of Redshirts led by Nino Bixio "seized" two steamships in Genoa from the Rubattino shipping company (the ships were actually provided by Rubattino following a secret agreement with the Kingdom of Piedmont-Sardinia, which paid the temporary rent of the two ships). The two ships were renamed Il Piemonte and Il Lombardo. That night, the expedition meticulously controlled by the Piedmontese authorities, set sail for Sicily, having embarked from a rock now known as the Scoglio dei Mille, at Quarto al Mare (now Quarto dei Mille), 5.6 km south-east of the Old Port of Genoa. The rock was situated directly in front of Villa Spinola (now Villa Carrara), the home of Candido Augusto Vecchi, his old comrade-in-arms from South American times, where Garibaldi had established his headquarters and lodgings.

According to Frederick Schneid, "Before embarking on the adventure, Garibaldi once again pledged his loyalty to Victor Emmanuel II and proclaimed that his intention was to conquer Sicily for the king. There is every indication that there was far more collusion between Cavour and Garibaldi, if not Victor Emmanuel and Garibaldi. After Garibaldi landed in Sicily, Admiral Persano received orders to support the expedition."

On 7 May, having no ammunition or gunpowder, Garibaldi decided to stop at Talamone, on the Tuscan coast, where he knew a military fort existed. In addition to the ammunition, he recovered three old cannons and a hundred rifles from the Sardinian army garrison stationed at fort. A second stop was made on 9 May, near Porto Santo Stefano (capital of Monte Argentario), for coal supply. Garibaldi officially obtained weapons and coal, as major general of the royal army, a title obtained during the 1859 campaign.

The two steamers, to avoid Bourbon ships, had followed an unusual route, which had taken them almost to the Tunisian coast. On this route near the Tunisian coast, however, it was observed that on the morning of the last day of navigation, at the Il Lombardo's speed of 7 miles per hour and after 40 hours of navigation, the two steamers could not be more than 280 miles from the departure from Argentario promontory and therefore approximately at the height of the Aegadian Islands or to the west of them, at least 70 miles from Cape Bon, without considering delays and stops. The Thousand, intending to turn towards Sciacca, after having excluded Menfi, between Selinunte and Sciacca, due to shallow water and disembarkation difficulties, then headed for Marsala, as they were informed by the crews of an English sailing ship and a Sicilian fishing vessel owned by master Strazzeri that the city's port was not protected by Bourbon vessels. The absence of Bourbons convinced Garibaldi to head towards Marsala, where the Thousand steamers arrived in the early hours of the afternoon of 11 May 1860.

The army of the Kingdom of the Two Sicilies, which the Expedition of the Thousand and the insurgents had to face, was numerically considerable. In 1860 the active army was made up of four army corps, one of the guards and three of the line, for a total of around 90,000 soldiers in active service and over 50,000 in the reserve, therefore overall the total of the Two Sicilies forces at full mobilization could have had 143,586 personnel, while according to other sources, the maximum number that could be mobilized with the reserves totaled 130,000.

=== Landing in Sicily ===
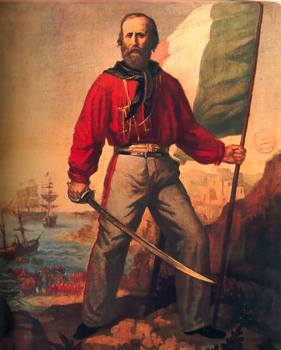
Giuseppe Garibaldi lands in Marsala, 11 May 1860

Garibaldi's landing in Marsala on 11 May 1860, on the westernmost point of Sicily, was favored by various circumstances, in particular by the presence of two Royal Navy ships under Admiral Rodney Mundy in the port of Marsala, the gunboat HMS Argus and sloop-of-war HMS Intrepid. Due to their presence in the harbour, the Bourbon ships were deterred from interfering. (Note: These were: Stromboli (steam corvette), Valoroso (brigandine), Partenope (sail frigate) and the armed steamer Capri.) The Lombardo was attacked and sunk only after the disembarkation had been completed, while the Piemonte was captured.

Furthermore, the Bourbon commanders, ignoring the recommendations of the secret services of the Kingdom of the Two Sicilies, just one day before the landing, had the column of General Letizia and Major d'Ambrosio repatriated to Palermo to face the insurrectionary threat in the Sicilian capital. The landing had been preceded by the arrival of Francesco Crispi and others, who had the task of gaining the support of the locals for the volunteers.

According to the historian George Macaulay Trevelyan in his book Garibaldi and the Thousand, Argus and Intrepid did nothing to help Garibaldi, nor could they have because their boilers were turned off and they were moored offshore, with their captains Marryat and Winnington-Ingram on the ground together with portions of their crews.

The Royal Navy's neutrality was confirmed during the following battle of Palermo, when Garibaldi, his troops almost out of gunpowder, unsuccessfully requested more from the captains of British warships moored off the coast of the city. They were joined, as early as 12 May, by 200 Sicilian volunteers commanded by the Sant'Anna brothers. Their forces increased due to the subsequent landings of Sardinian troops in civilian clothes and the liberation of prisoners taken from the Bourbon prisons.

=== Calatafimi and Palermo ===
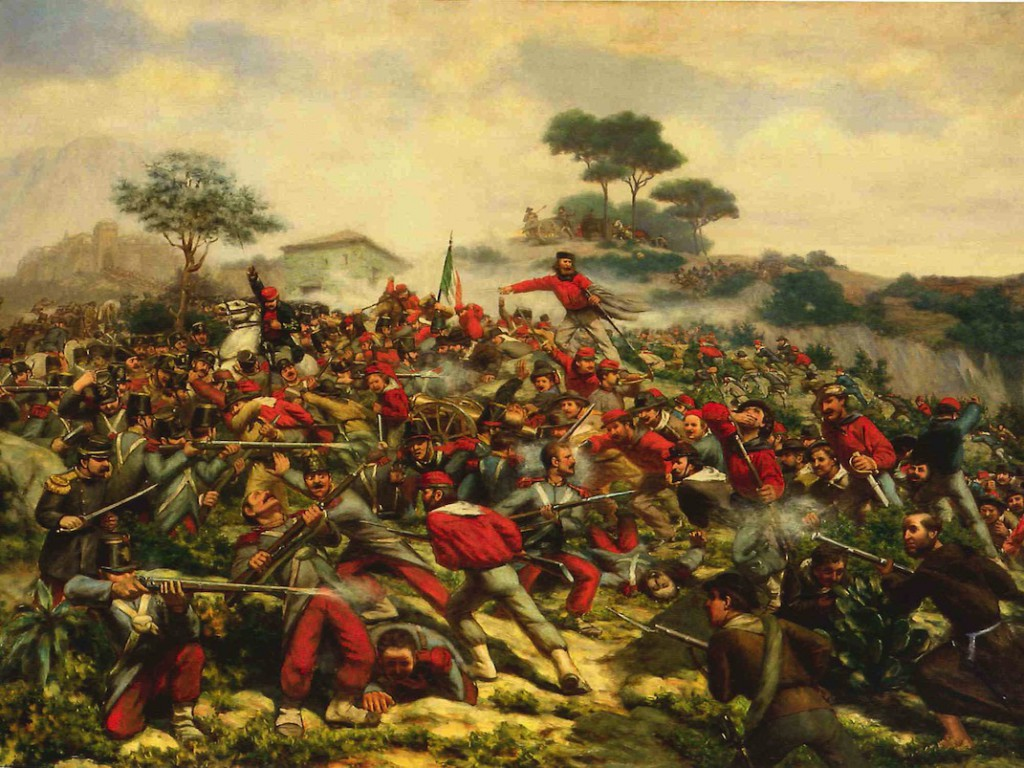
Battle of Calatafimi, 15 May 1860

On 12 May Garibaldi left Marsala and advanced quickly and easily towards the interior of Sicily. In the following days, a thousand Sicilian volunteers joined the expedition, including Franciscan priests. The volunteers are grouped within a new military structure, the Hunters of Etna, directed by Giuseppe La Masa. On 14 May 1860 in Salemi, after an enthusiastic welcome which reassured him of the participation of the population, Garibaldi declared to ensure the dictatorship of Sicily in the name of King Victor Emmanuel II, which would then come later.

The Thousand, flanked by 500 Sicilian insurgents, had their first clash on 15 May 1860 in the battle of Calatafimi against around 3,000 royal troops (Note: According to De Cesare (II. 210) the royal soldiers would have been 4,000 and de' Sivo says 3,000 (III. 121). The number of 3,000 is estimated on the basis of the fact that 20 companies were foreseen (ranging from 160 to 90 men), for approximately 3,000 men, but since Landi himself states that 14 companies were present in the field, the number should be estimated according to the historical Trevelyan in 2,000. – Garibaldi and the Thousand – Appendix M, G. M. Trevelyan, p. 447.) led by General Francesco Landi. The news of the victory of the Thousand spread rapidly in the area, fomenting revolt among the Sicilian population. In Alcamo, on the way to Palermo, the Two Sicilies troops were attacked by Sicilians who shot from houses and balconies, and in retaliation, the soldiers set many houses on fire. In Partinico the population rebelled against the attempted forced requisition of goods and food by the retreating soldiers with a bloody popular revolt. The battle boosted the morale of the Thousand and, at the same time, depressed the Bourbons, who were poorly led by their often corrupt higher officers, and started to feel abandoned. Garibaldi promised land to every male who volunteered to fight against the Bourbons, and the ranks of the Thousand enlarged to 1,200 with local men.

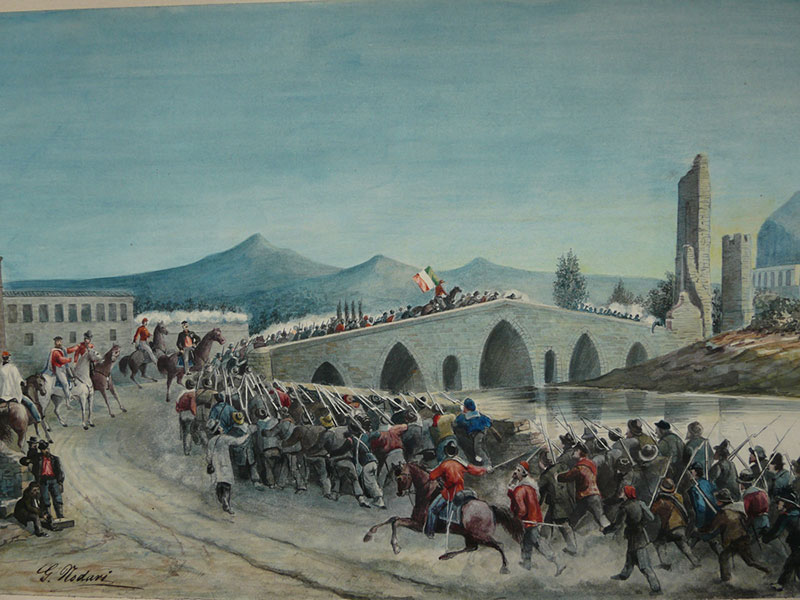
The Thousand cross the "Admiral's Bridge" in Palermo.

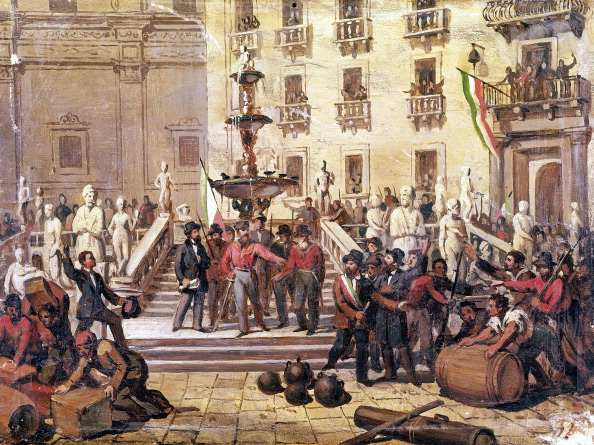
Giuseppe Garibaldi marches through conquered Palermo.

After the battle of Calatafimi Giuseppe Garibaldi headed for Palermo passing through Alcamo and Partinico. Along the journey, the Thousand were joined by 3,200 Sicilians, bringing the number of fighters under Garibaldi's orders to 4,000 men. From there, Garibaldi and the Sicilian volunteers arrived in Palermo on 27 May and prepared to enter the city, through the Admiral's Bridge and the Porto Termini manned by the Bourbon military. After a hard battle, the royal troops abandoned the field and retreated to Palermo. A Garibaldian column crossed the Porta Termini and entered the city, while another column entered Palermo, crossing the Porta Sant'Antonino with less difficulty.

Aided by the Palermo insurrection, between 28 May and 30 May, the Garibaldians and the insurgents, often fighting street by street, conquered the whole city, despite the indiscriminate bombardment carried out by the Bourbon ships and by the positions present on the floor in front of the Palazzo dei Normanni and the Castello a Mare. On 29 May there was a decisive counterattack by the royal troops which, however, was contained. Thus began the Siege of Palermo. On 30 May the Bourbons, barricaded in the fortresses along the walls, asked for an armistice (organized by the British Admiral Rodney Mundy), which was granted and which lasted from 30 May to 3 June. On 6 June the Bourbon troops defending the Sicilian capital capitulated in exchange for permission to leave the city, asking for the honor of arms, which Garibaldi granted as they were also Italian. The garrison evacuated on 7 July, after King Francis II authorized the Bourbon withdrawal.

=== Support of national and international opinion ===
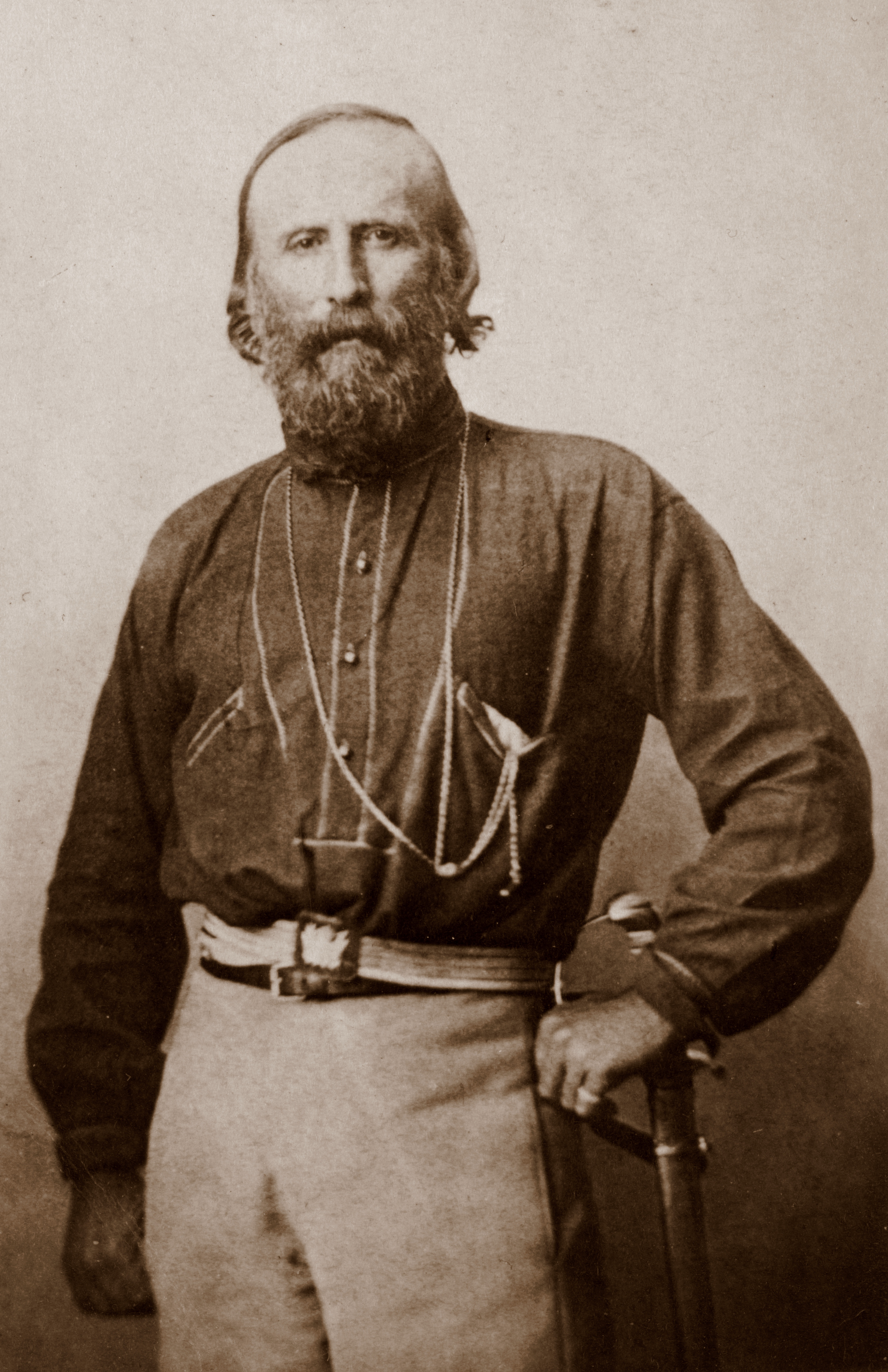
Giuseppe Garibaldi is celebrated as one of the greatest generals of modern times and as the "Hero of the Two Worlds".

On 21 June 1860 Giuseppe Garibaldi definitively occupied Palermo. The news went around the world and public opinion took up the cause of the expedition. In the United Kingdom, workers from Glasgow and Liverpool offered days of work to support the expedition. The French daily newspaper Le Siècle launched an appeal for fundraising and the enlistment of volunteers. Having left Marseille on 9 May, Alexandre Dumas and Giustiniano Lebano arrived in Palermo on 30 May from his personal yacht to supply Garibaldi with weapons. Dumas, a friend of Garibaldi, also organized the propaganda of the expedition through the newspapers.

George Sand and Victor Hugo, then in exile, supported Garibaldi's action. The same went for Karl Marx and Friedrich Engels. These, in the New-York Tribune, considered the conquest of Palermo "one of the most surprising military feats of our century". Funds and volunteers arrived from all over Europe, the United States, Uruguay and Chile. Giacomo Medici and Enrico Cosenz were joined by 33 Englishmen, as well as the socialist Paul de Flotte who was the only foreign Garibaldian to obtain, posthumously, the Medal of the Thousand.

It is essentially the respect for the figure of Garibaldi that caused this outburst of generosity, while the reactionary governments, Austrian Empire, Russian Empire, Kingdom of Prussia and Spain, protest against the Sardinian government, the alleged beneficiary of the events.

=== Formation of the dictatorial government ===
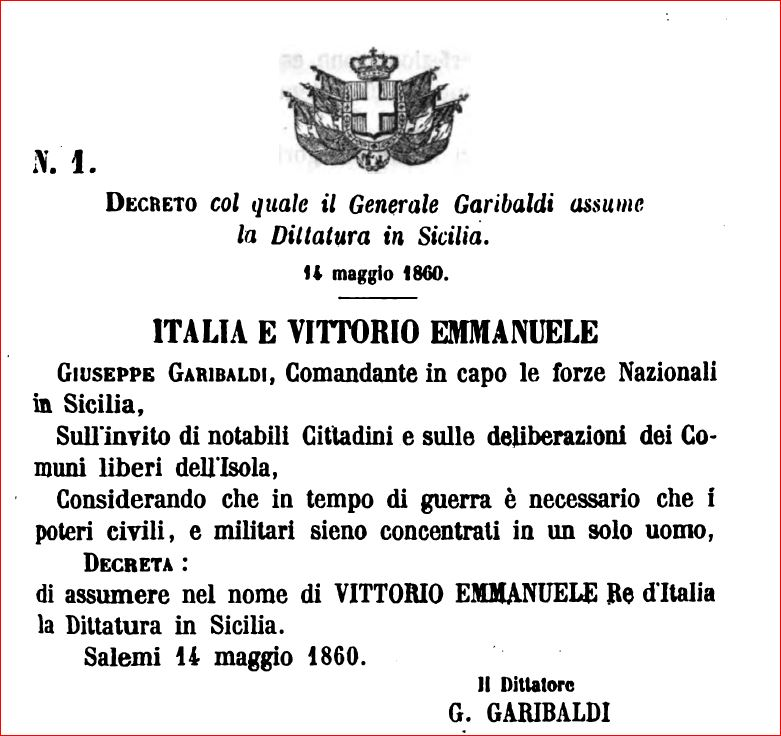
The decree with which Giuseppe Garibaldi assumes the title of Dictator in Sicily

On 7 July, Giuseppe Garibaldi proclaimed himself Dictator of Sicily "in the name of Victor Emmanuel, King of Italy". Garibaldi then ordered Giacomo Medici to advance upon Messina, Enrico Cosenz to advance upon Catania, and Nino Bixio to advance upon Syracuse, gathering more Sicilian volunteer irregulars. King Francis II strengthened his Bourbon garrisons at Messina and Syracuse.

Meanwhile the dictatorial government was taking shape, on 2 June in Palermo, six ministries were created by Garibaldi: War, Interior, Finance, Justice, Public Education and Worship, Foreign Affairs and Commerce. Garibaldi also appointed his representatives to the governments of London, Paris and Turin. He also signed a decree which assigned pensions to widows and state assistance to the orphans of those killed in the national cause.

=== Landings of reinforcements and formation of the Southern Army ===
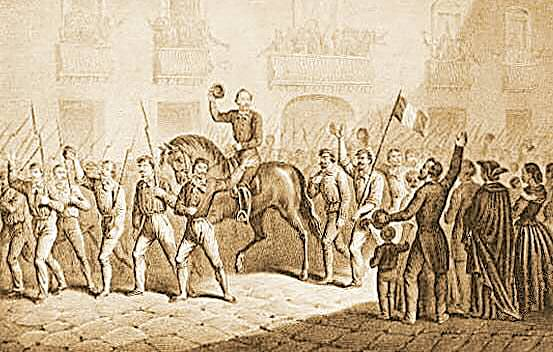
The Medici column entering Palermo

During the month of June, Giuseppe Garibaldi was joined by other Sicilian volunteers and those from other parts of Italy, whose arrivals occurred almost daily, forming part of what was then called the Southern Army. On 5 and 7 July, over 2,000 volunteers commanded by Enrico Cosenz landed in Palermo. On 9 July several hundred volunteers arrived at an old coal mine. On 22 July around 1,535 volunteers, almost all from Lombardy, arrived in Palermo on two ships, under the command of Gaetano Sacchi.

The departures of the subsequent Garibaldi expeditions almost all took place from the port of Genoa and two from Livorno in the period from 24 May 1860 until 20 August 1860, when the departures from Genoa ceased, and then resumed with a final expedition from the port of Livorno, which took place between 1 September and 3 September (Nicotera expedition).

Overall, more than 20 naval expeditions departed, for a total of approximately 21,000 volunteers, in addition to the first 1,000. At the end of August 1860, departures from the northern ports were suspended by Cavour, who intended to invade the Papal States and the territory of the Kingdom of the Two Sicilies.

=== Bourbon troops retreat and the restoration of the constitution ===
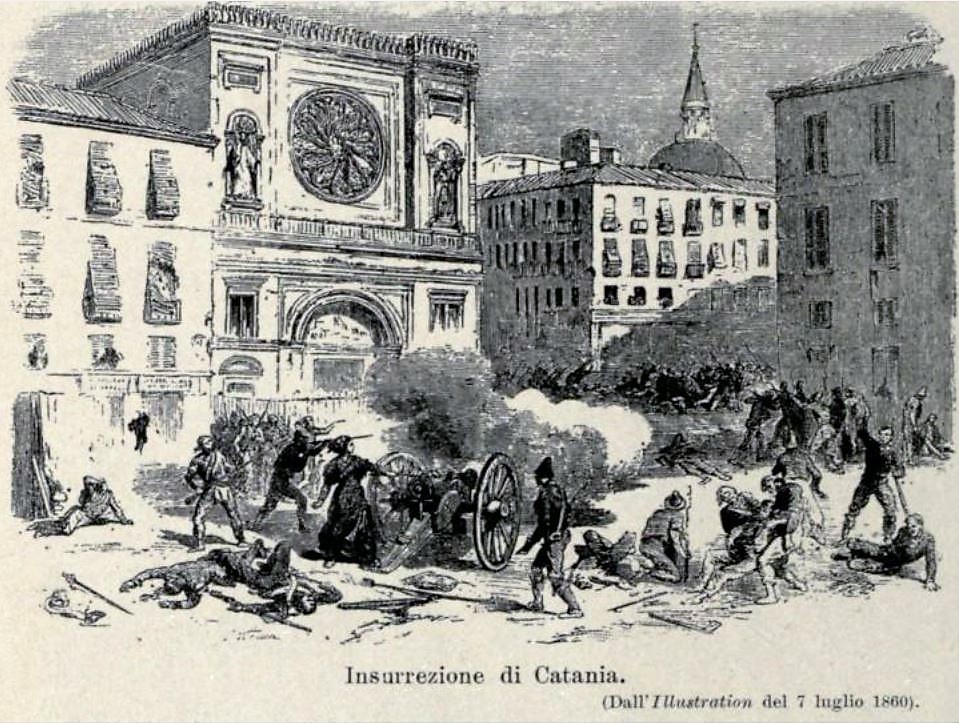
Catania insurrection

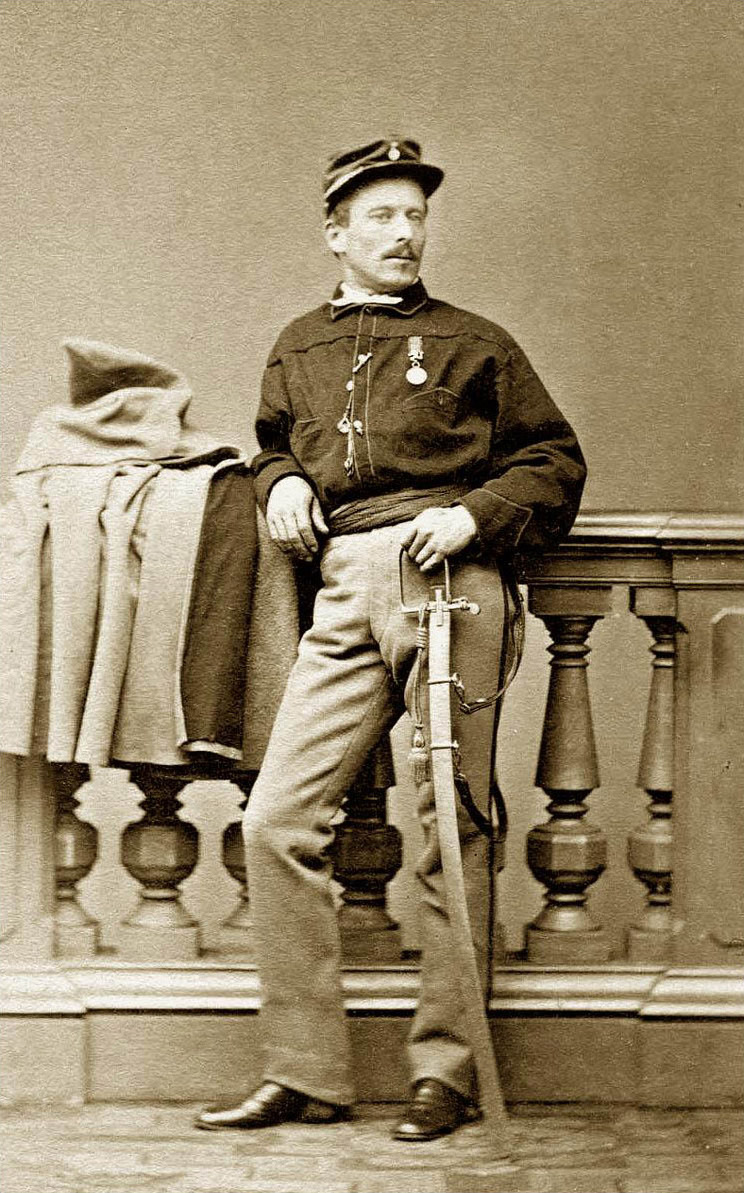
A Red Shirt volunteer of the Thousand, wearing the Marsala Medal

The Bourbon troops were ordered to retreat eastwards and evacuate Sicily. An insurrection that had broken out in Catania on 31 May, led by Nicola Fabrizi, was crushed by the local garrison, but the order to leave for Messina meant that this Bourbon tactical success would have no practical results.

The city of Catania was severely affected by 15 days of state of siege, which added to the inconveniences due to the situation in which the island had found itself for two months. On 3 June the royal troops retreated from Catania by land towards Messina, escorted from the sea by a warship followed by other chartered ships loaded with ammunition and everything they had been able to take from the city they had abandoned.

In Acireale, after the departure of the Bourbon troops, who abandoned the city, the exasperated population indulged in retaliation against supporters of the Bourbons, who were killed, but the situation was soon brought back to calm by the most influential citizens.

At the time only Syracuse, Augusta, Milazzo and Messina remained in royal hands in Sicily. In the meantime, Garibaldi issued his first law. A levy failed to muster more than 20,000 troops, while the peasants, who hoped for immediate relief from the grievous conditions to which they were forced by the landowners, revolted in several localities. At Bronte, on 4 August 1860, Garibaldi's friend Nino Bixio bloodily repressed one of these revolts with two battalions of Redshirts.

The pace of Garibaldi's victories had worried Cavour, who in early July sent him a proposal of immediate annexation of Sicily to Piedmont. Garibaldi, however, refused vehemently to allow such a move until the end of the war. Cavour's envoy, Giuseppe La Farina, was arrested and expelled from the island. He was replaced by the more malleable Agostino Depretis, who gained Garibaldi's trust and was appointed as pro-dictator.

On 25 June 1860, King Francis II of the Two Sicilies restored the constitution granted during the Revolutions of 1848 in the Italian states, which was in force from 29 January 1848 to 12 March 1849, when King Ferdinand II of the Two Sicilies effectively re-established monarchical absolutism until 1860. The restoration of the 1848 constitution had brought Francis II only the apparent consent of France and a few other subjects, but no practical application of constitutional government followed. However, this belated attempt to conciliating his moderate subjects failed to push them to defend the regime, while liberals and revolutionaries were eager to welcome Garibaldi.

=== Complete occupation of Sicily ===
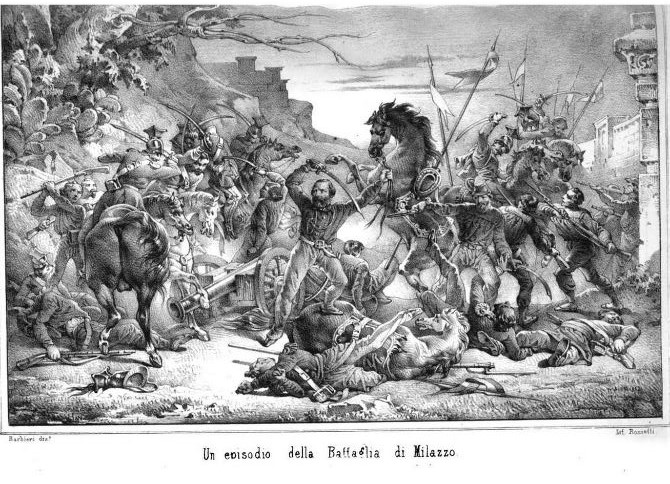
Battle of Milazzo, 17–24 July 1860

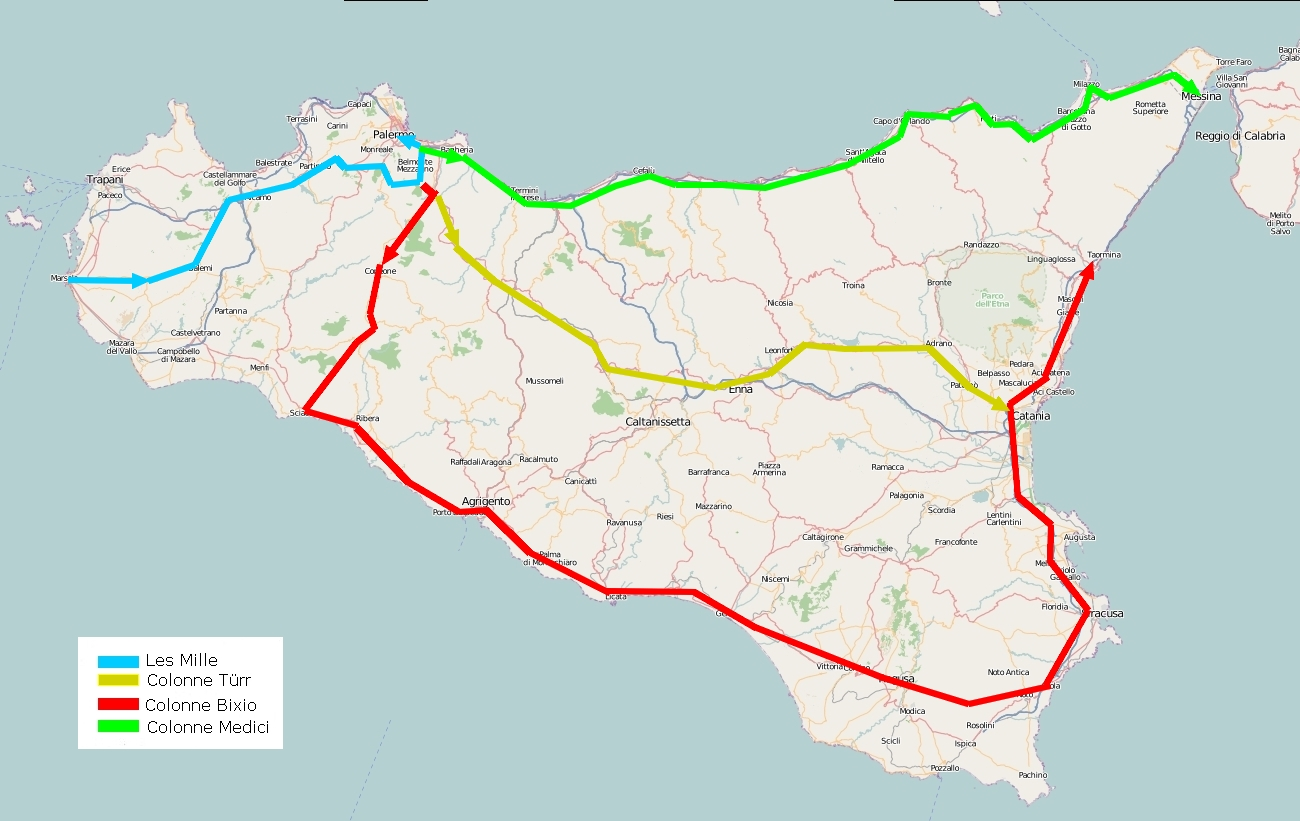
The conquest of Sicily by the Expedition of the Thousand

On 20 July Giuseppe Garibaldi attacked Milazzo with 4,000 men, under the command of Giacomo Medici and Enrico Cosenz, against Ferdinando Beneventano del Bosco's 4,500. On 1 August, Ferdinando Beneventano del Bosco surrendered with honors, and was taken by ship to Real Cittadella, which was soon under siege. Garibaldi arrived in Milazzo from Palermo by ship aboard the Scottish paddle steamer City of Aberdeen. The steamship City of Aberdeen had been chartered due to subscriptions collected in Scotland, where Garibaldi was very popular, as he was considered the Italian William Wallace.

The Garibaldini led by Giacomo Medici arrived in Messina on 27 July, when part of the Bourbon troops had already left the city. The following day, Garibaldi arrived. With the city in the hands of the Thousand, General Tommaso Clary, commander of the Bourbons, the Deputy Chief of Staff of the Military Command Cristiano Lobbia and General Giacomo Medici signed an agreement, which provided for the abandonment of Messina by the Bourbon militias, provided that no damage was caused to the city and that their embarkation towards Naples was not disturbed.

Garibaldi had thus obtained a free field, and the Bourbon soldiers re-embarked towards the continent. With the conquest of Messina, Garibaldi began preparations to cross the Straits of Messina, appointing Agostino Depretis pro-dictator to govern Sicily. Meanwhile, while Garibaldi was advancing in the Kingdom of the Two Sicilies, plans had been devised to stop him, through an attempt on his life, all without success. On 1 August the Bourbon fortresses of Syracuse and Augusta also capitulated, concluding the conquest of Sicily.

=== Landing and conquest in Calabria ===
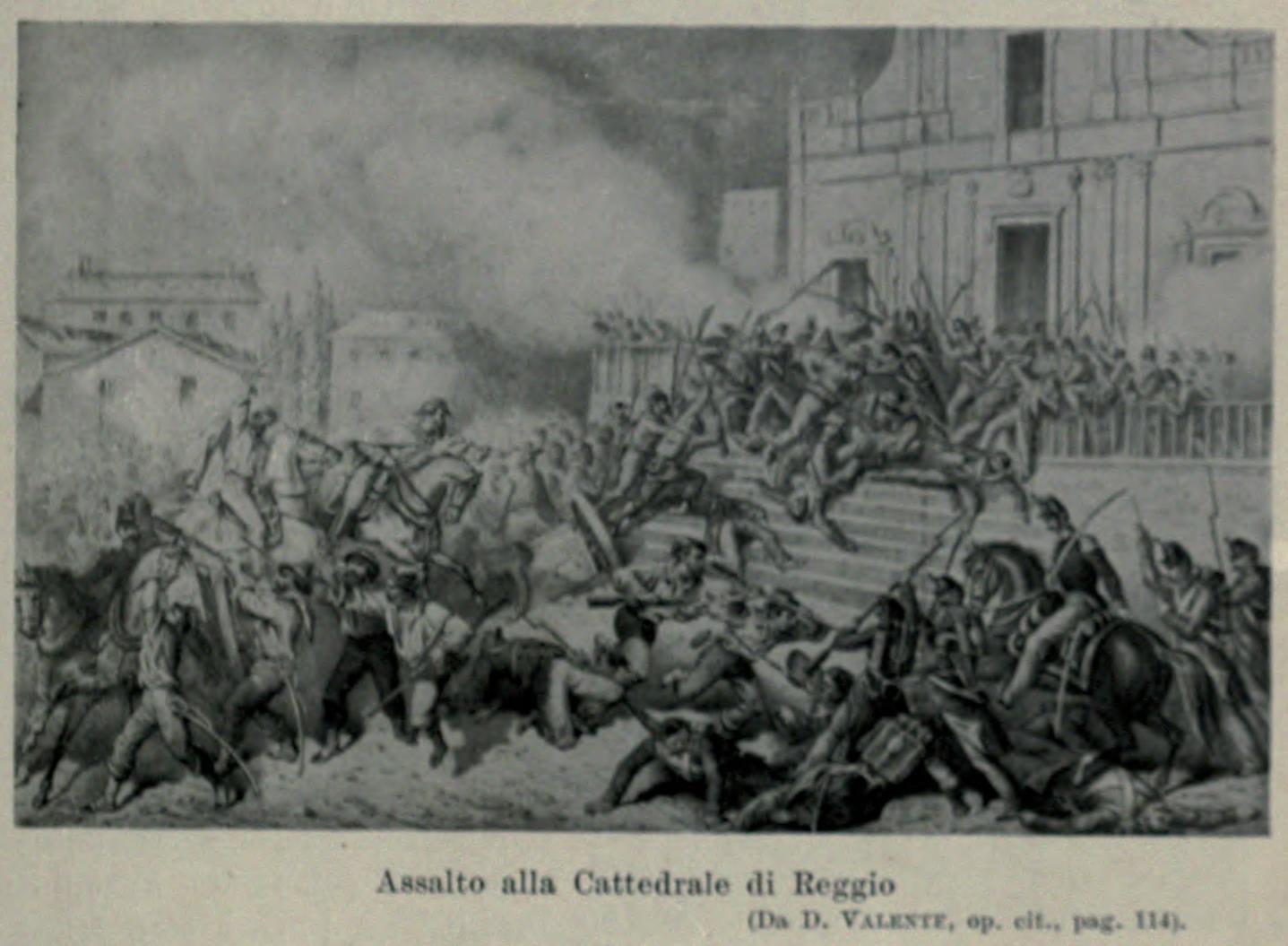
Garibaldi captures Reggio Calabria, 21 August 1860

Giuseppe Garibaldi had previously sent authoritative exponents of the anti-Bourbon conspiracy such as Antonino Plutino, Francesco Stocco and Giuseppe Pace to Calabria to prepare insurrections, while he had sent Nicola Mignogna to Basilicata. With the neutralization of Messina, Garibaldi began preparations for the crossing to the continent.

On 19 August Garibaldi's men disembarked in Calabria, a move opposed by Cavour, who had written the Dictator a letter urging him to not cross the Straits of Messina. Garibaldi, however, disobeyed, an act which had the silent approval of King Victor Emmanuel II and therefore crossed the Strait of Messina to land in Calabria. According to Frederick Schneid, "The timing of Garibaldi's crossing of the Straits of Messina and the invasion of the Papal States was more than coincidence. After various attempts, Garibaldi landed in Calabria on 19 August 1860 with 3,700 men. He chose a longer route to avoid the Bourbon troops and landed on the beach of Melito di Porto Salvo.

Garibaldi now had almost 20,000 soldiers due to the aggregation of local volunteers to Garibaldi's Red Shirts, against the Bourbons' 80,000; the confrontation therefore proved difficult from the beginning. However, against all expectations, he encountered only weak resistance. The Bourbons, apart from some episodes like that of Reggio Calabria, which was conquered at high cost by Nino Bixio on 21 August, offered insignificant resistance, as numerous units of the Bourbon army disbanded spontaneously or even joined Garibaldi's ranks. On 30 August the Bourbon army, commanded by General Giuseppe Ghio, was disarmed in Soveria Mannelli and surrendered without a fight to the column commanded by Francesco Stocco. The Bourbon fleet behaved in a similar way.

=== Conquest of Basilicata and advance towards Naples ===
On 2 September, Giuseppe Garibaldi and his men entered Basilicata (the first region of the continental part of the kingdom to rise against the Bourbons), precisely in Rotonda. His passage to Lucania ended without problems, since the pro-dictatorial government was established well before his arrival (19 August), due to the contribution of Giacinto Albini and Pietro Lacava, authors of the Lucanian insurrection in favor of national unity.

The following day, Garibaldi crossed the coast of Maratea by boat and near Lagonegro he gathered the Lucanian men who followed him to the Battle of the Volturno (among these was Carmine Crocco, later a famous post-unification brigand). On 6 September Garibaldi met Giacinto Albini in Auletta and appointed the patriot Governor of Basilicata. On the night of the same day he slept in Eboli in the house of Francesco La Francesca and headed, with his troops, towards Naples, capital of the Kingdom of the Two Sicilies.

=== Bourbon anti-liberal reaction in Irpinia, Abruzzo and Molise ===
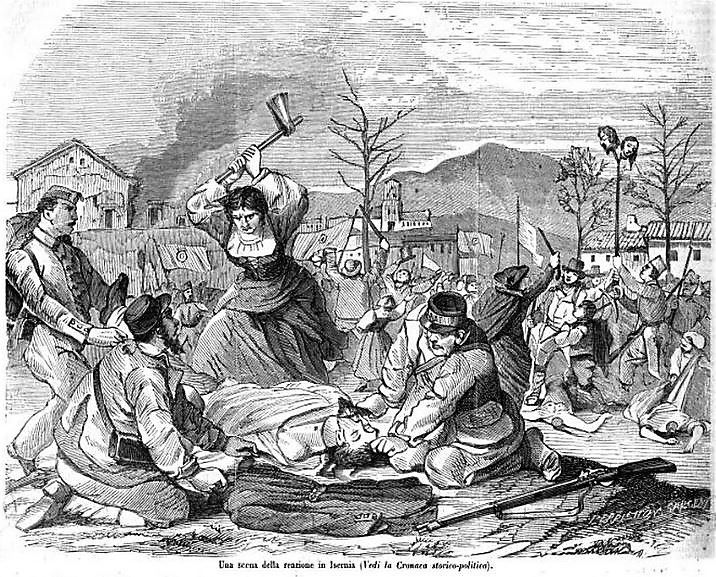
Bourbon anti-liberal reaction in Isernia

In the north of the Kingdom of the Two Sicilies, where the population was most subjected to clerical influence, there were cases of so-called "reaction", a term then used to indicate those who opposed the change towards a united Italy. On 8 September in the district of Ariano and Montemiletto in Irpinia the Bourbon generals Bonanno and Flores, who arrived there with 4,000 soldiers, had provoked an anti-liberal insurrection by the peasants loyal to the Bourbons, who began to carry out robberies, massacres, slaughtering the leaders of the liberal party who had not fled in time, and robberies of all kinds to the detriment of the local population with liberal sentiments.

To quell the riots, 1,500 Garibaldians commanded by István Türr were sent and despite their numerical superiority, the Bourbon soldiers of General Bonanno offered no resistance. István Türr, also assisted by the local National Guard, advanced towards Venticano and Monte Mileto where following a small clash arrests were made. In Grottaminarda, General Flores was arrested by the National Guard of Montefusco. István Türr acted with caution, ordering the shooting of only two of the ringleaders of the massacre and the violence, without giving in to the demands of the local liberals who would have instead wanted a much more extensive punishment for at least a dozen of those responsible. Subsequently, in Abruzzo and Molise the troops of the Sardinian army had to carry out harsher repression against the reactionaries who rose up against the new political structure.

Other similar and serious events occurred in Isernia in Molise for a few days during the battle of the Volturno, when, following indications from the bishop, from the authorities of Gaeta and, led by gendarmes loyal to the Bourbons, the farmers invaded the city of Isernia and other nearby towns, carrying out an entire week of looting, massacres, serious violence and even mutilations of their liberal victims. The episodes of reaction against the liberals and supporters of the unity of Italy continued and were often bloody as reported by the press of the time in the case of the Lauro massacre in the then Terra di Lavoro, which occurred with great brutality.

=== Conclusion ===
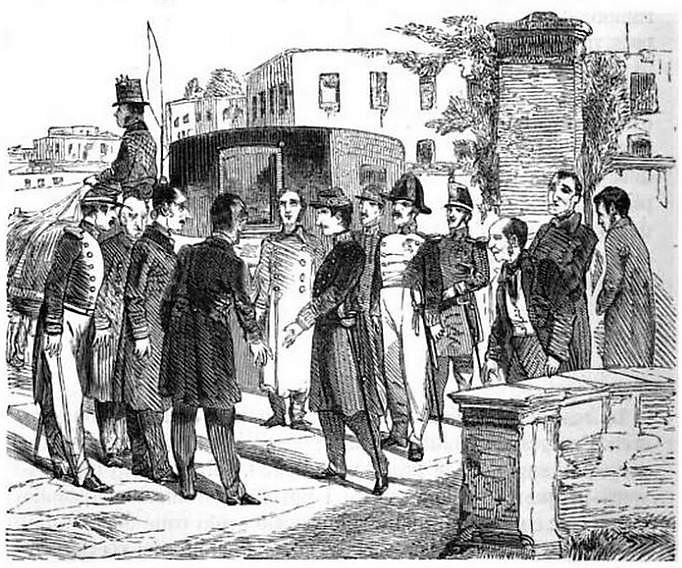
King Francis II leaves the Royal Palace of Naples, 6 September 1860

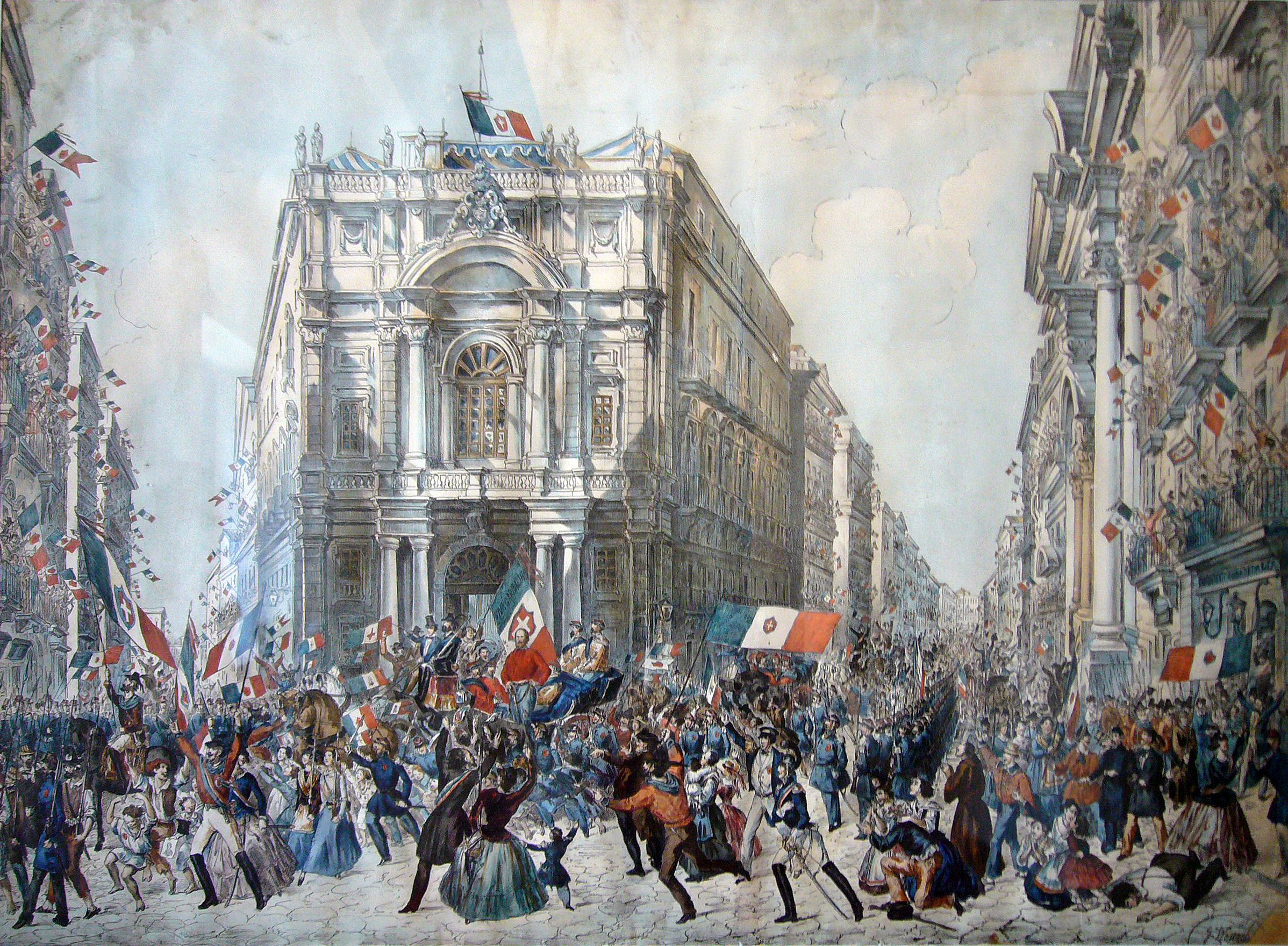
Garibaldi's entry into Naples, 7 September 1860

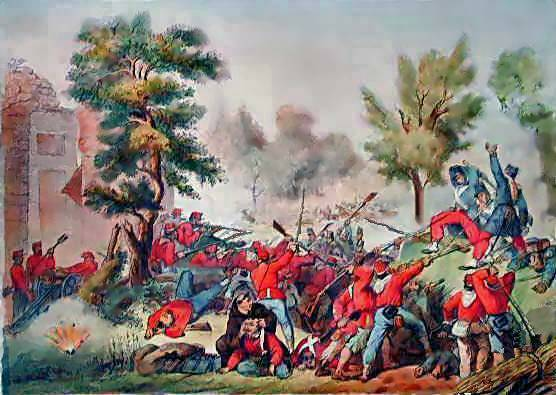
Battle of the Volturno, 1 October 1860

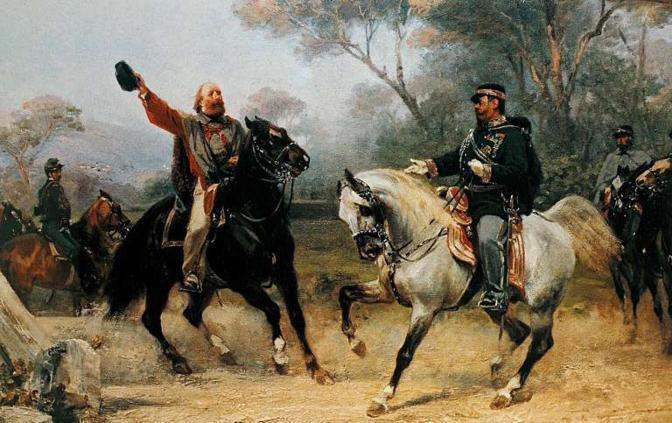
Meeting between King Victor Emmanuel II and Giuseppe Garibaldi at Teano, 26 October 1860

The last period of King Francis II's stay in Naples was marked by a conspiratorial climate towards him. Francis II no longer had faith in his ministers, even if they were apparently loyal to him. The soldiers and ministers gave contradictory advice, denigrating each other, the esprit de corps had weakened in the leaders more than in the troops.

Left without government and abandoned by the men of the court, Francis II, with Giuseppe Garibaldi continuing his advance towards Naples without obstacles, had almost no trust in anyone, uncertain whether to advance to face Garibaldi, resist Naples or retreat north.

On 6 September, King Francis II fled Naples for the fortress city of Gaeta, and moved his army to the Volturno river. Thus, on 7 September, Garibaldi was able to enter Naples with his army, welcomed as a liberator, and taking possession of the entire Kingdom of the Two Sicilies. The Bourbon troops, still present in abundance and quartered in the castles, offered no resistance and surrendered shortly after.

After Garibaldi's entry into Naples, the southern regions (Sicily, Calabria, Basilicata, and almost all of Campania) had been conquered by Garibaldi, while Lombardy, Emilia-Romagna, Tuscany had entered the Kingdom of Piedmont-Sardinia following the Second Italian War of Independence and the subsequent plebiscites. However, the South and North of the peninsula were still separated by the presence of the Papal State. King Victor Emmanuel II then decided to intervene with his army to annex Marche and Umbria, still in the hands of the Papal State, and thus unite the north and south of Italy.

On 11 September, Cavour instigated the invasion of the Papal States, led by Manfredo Fanti. The Papal Army was led by Louis Juchault de Lamoricière, though Pope Pius IX's hope that Napoleon III and Franz Josef I of Austria would come to his aid was unfounded. General Enrico Cialdini's IV Corps attacked Pesaro, Enrico Morozzo Della Rocca's V Corps advanced on Perugia, while Persano blockaded Ancona. On 18 September, the Papal Army under Lamoriciére were defeated during the Battle of Castelfidardo, and the siege of Ancona began, finally surrendering on 29 September. According to Frederick Schneid, "The fall of Ancona ended the campaign in the Papal States. The Piedmontese Army occupied most of Umbria and Marche."

At this point Garibaldi wanted to definitively put an end to the Bourbon monarchy. Between the end of September and the first days of October, the decisive Battle of the Volturno took place, where around 50,000 Bourbon soldiers lost the battle against Garibaldi's men, who were approximately half the size. It is believed that the forces actually engaged in the battle of 1 October were 28,000 Royal Bourbons against 20,000 Garibaldians, while on 2 October the Calabrian volunteers of Francesco Stocco, four Piedmontese companies and several dozen Piedmontese gunners in Santa Maria Capua Vetere joined the Garibaldians.

According to Frederick Schneid, "Garibaldi narrowly won the Battle of the Volturno. The Southern Army placed Capua under siege, and the Piedmontese forces marched on Gaeta where the erstwhile Bourbon king had taken refuge." The Savoia Brigade landed north of Capua, while Della Rocca's V Corps, and the rest of the Piedmontese Army, crossed the Two Sicilies frontier. A few days later (21 October) a plebiscite confirmed the annexation of the Kingdom of the Two Sicilies to the Kingdom of Piedmont-Sardinia by an overwhelming majority.

The detailed results of the plebiscites were:

Results of the plebiscites of 21 October 1860
| Territory | Number of inhabitants | Voters | In favor of annexation | Against annexation |
|---|---|---|---|---|
| Kingdom of Naples | 6,500,000 | 1,650,000 | 1,302,064 | 10,302 |
| Kingdom of Sicily | 2,232,000 | 575,000 | 432,053 | 667 |

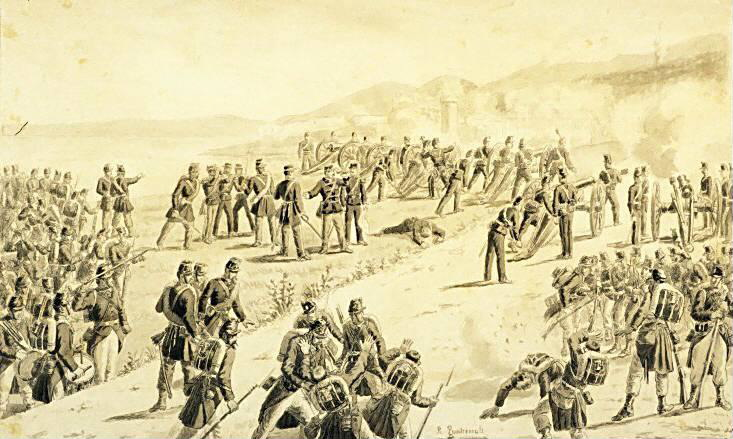
Siege of Gaeta, from 5 November 1860 to 13 February 1861

The end of the expedition took place with a meeting in Teano (Note: Other sources (including Del Boca) set the location of the meeting at Taverna della Catena, in the territory of the modern comune of Vairano Patenora.) (northern Campania) between Victor Emmanuel II and Giuseppe Garibaldi on 26 October 1860. Others assign instead the end of the campaign to the King's entrance into Naples on 7 November. The meeting at Teano has risen to a high symbolic value in Italian historiography, as it gives the House of Savoy sovereignty over the former Kingdom of the Two Sicilies and therefore over the entire Italian peninsula.

However, the military campaign was not yet fully completed, as Francis II and the remains of the Bourbon army held out in Gaeta. The siege of Gaeta was first started by Garibaldi, replaced on 4 November 1860 by the Sardinian army which concluded the siege on 13 February 1861, defeating the Bourbon army, which surrendered. During the first ten days of November 1860, around 17,000 Bourbon soldiers, pursued by the troops of Victor Emmanuel II, took refuge in the Papal State in Terracina, where they were disarmed and interned in the Alban Hills by the papal authorities and the French garrison of Rome. With the surrender of Francis II, the last Bourbons of the Two Sicilies went into exile in Rome under the protection of Pope Pius IX.

=== Garibaldi's departure from Naples ===
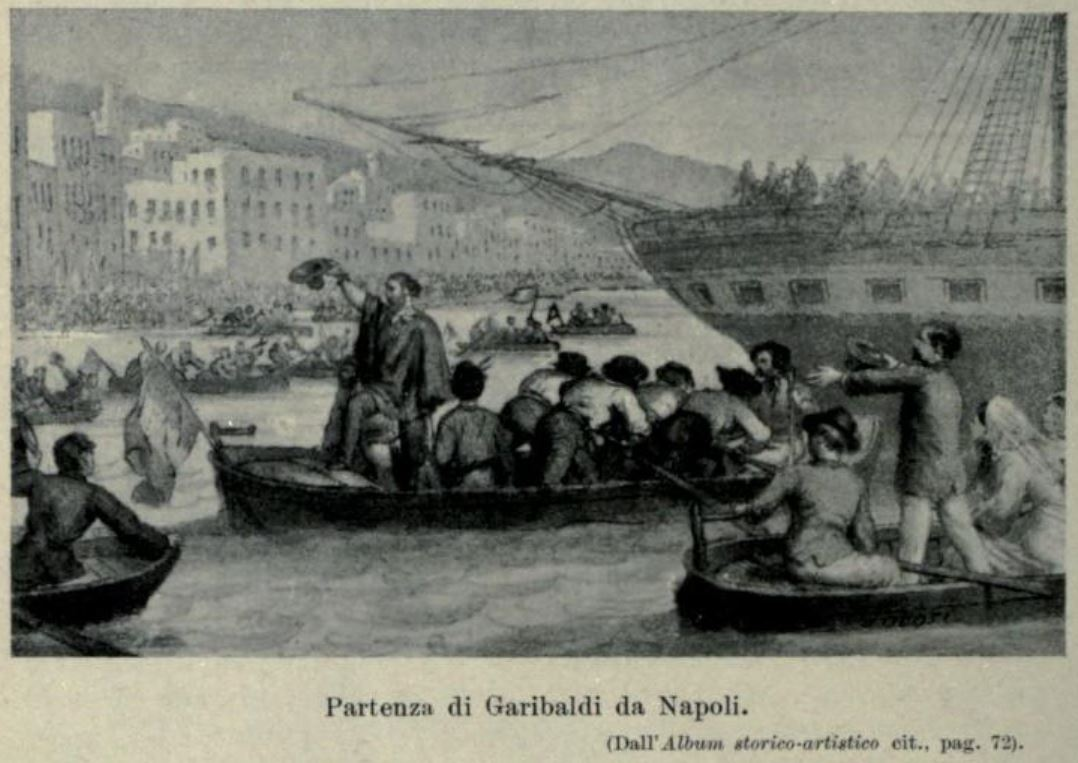
Garibaldi's departure from Naples, 9 November 1860

On 9 November 1860, at 4:00 am, Giuseppe Garibaldi boarded a rowing boat in the harbor of Santa Lucia of Naples, to embark on board the ship Washington. Six months and three days had passed since the departure on the night between 5 and 6 May 1860, starting the Expedition of the Thousands.

Garibaldi returned to Caprera after having accomplished a difficult feat, and despite a letter from the king asking him to stay, Garibaldi's response was that he was leaving for the moment, but that he would be ready to leave again on the day in which the country and the king needed him.

The decision was subsequently explained by Garibaldi that the exaggerated flattery of which he had been the subject of many respected people, who until shortly before had been Bourbons and who very quickly proclaimed themselves Garibaldines, as well as expressing criticism towards other protagonists of the events of that period.

=== Role of the Italian tricolour ===
Flag of Two Sicilies from 21 June 1860 to 17 March 1861

Starting from its first adoption, popular support for the Italian tricolour grew steadily, until it became one of the most important symbols of the Italian unification. The Italian tricolour was also a symbol of the revolutions of 1848. In 1848 King Charles Albert of Piedmont-Sardinia assured the provisional government of Milan, established during the Five Days of Milan, that his troops, ready to come to his aid by starting the First Italian War of Independence, would use a tricolour defaced with the Savoyan coat of arms superimposed on the white as a war flag. This turning point lasted until the failure of revolutions and the end of the First Italian War of Independence (1849), which ended with the defeat of the Piedmont-Sardinian Army of Charles Albert; after this, the ancient flags were restored. Only the Kingdom of Piedmont-Sardinia confirmed the Italian tricolour as the national flag of the state even after the First Italian War of Independence ended.

The Italian tricolour accompanied, although not officially, the volunteers of the Expedition of the Thousand led by Giuseppe Garibaldi. Garibaldi, in particular, had an absolute deference and respect for the Italian tricolour. Shortly after the loss of Sicily, on 25 June 1860, trying to limit the damage given the growing participation of the population in the Expedition of the Thousand, King Francis II of the Two Sicilies, decreed that the green, white and red flag was also the official banner of his Kingdom, with the royal coat of arms superimposed on the white.

Adopted on 21 June 1860, this lasted until 17 March 1861, when the Two Sicilies was incorporated into the Kingdom of Piedmont-Sardinia, after its defeat in the Expedition of the Thousand. Ironically, in the final phase of the Expedition of the Thousand, the tricolour of the Kingdom of the Two Sicilies fluttered in antagonism to the tricolour flag of the Kingdom of Piedmont-Sardinia. Two of the original tricolours that flew on the Il Lombardo steamship that participated, together with Il Piemonte, in the Expedition of the Thousand, are preserved respectively inside the Central Museum of the Risorgimento at the Vittoriano in Rome and the Museum of the Risorgimento in Palermo.

Already on another occasion, the Kingdom of the Two Siliciles adopted the Italian tricoulor as its flag. The flag of the Constitutional Kingdom of the Two Sicilies, a white field charged with the royal coat of arms, was modified by Ferdinand II during revolutions of 1848 through the addition of a red and green border. This flag lasted from 3 April 1848 until 19 May 1849. The Provisional Government of Sicily, which lasted from 12 January 1848 to 15 May 1849 during the Sicilian Revolution, adopted the Italian tricolour, defaced with the trinacria, or triskelion. In 1849, once the insurrectional uprisings were over, the Kingdom of the Two Sicilies restored its ancient flag.

=== Maps ===
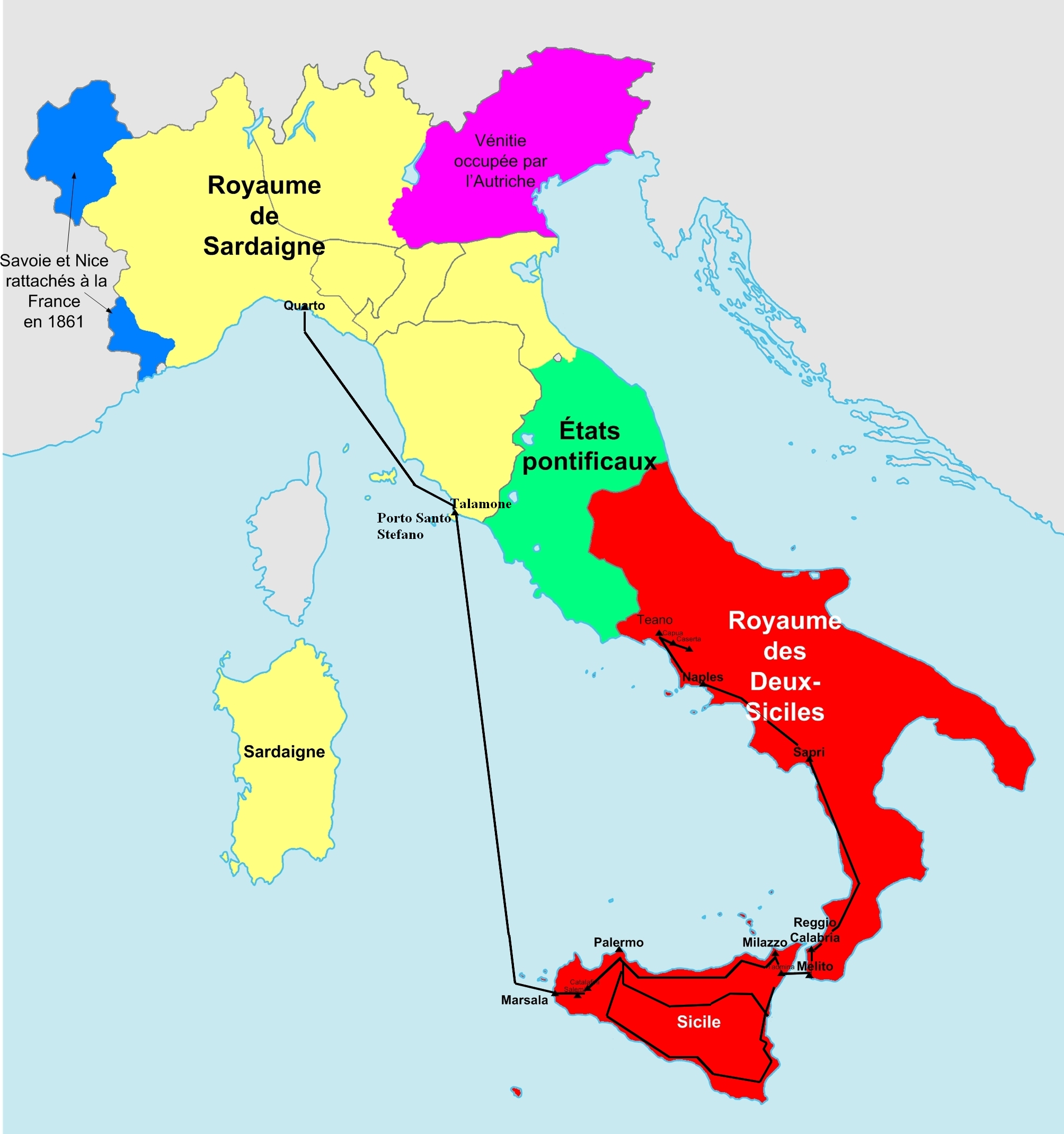
The route of the Expedition of the Thousand

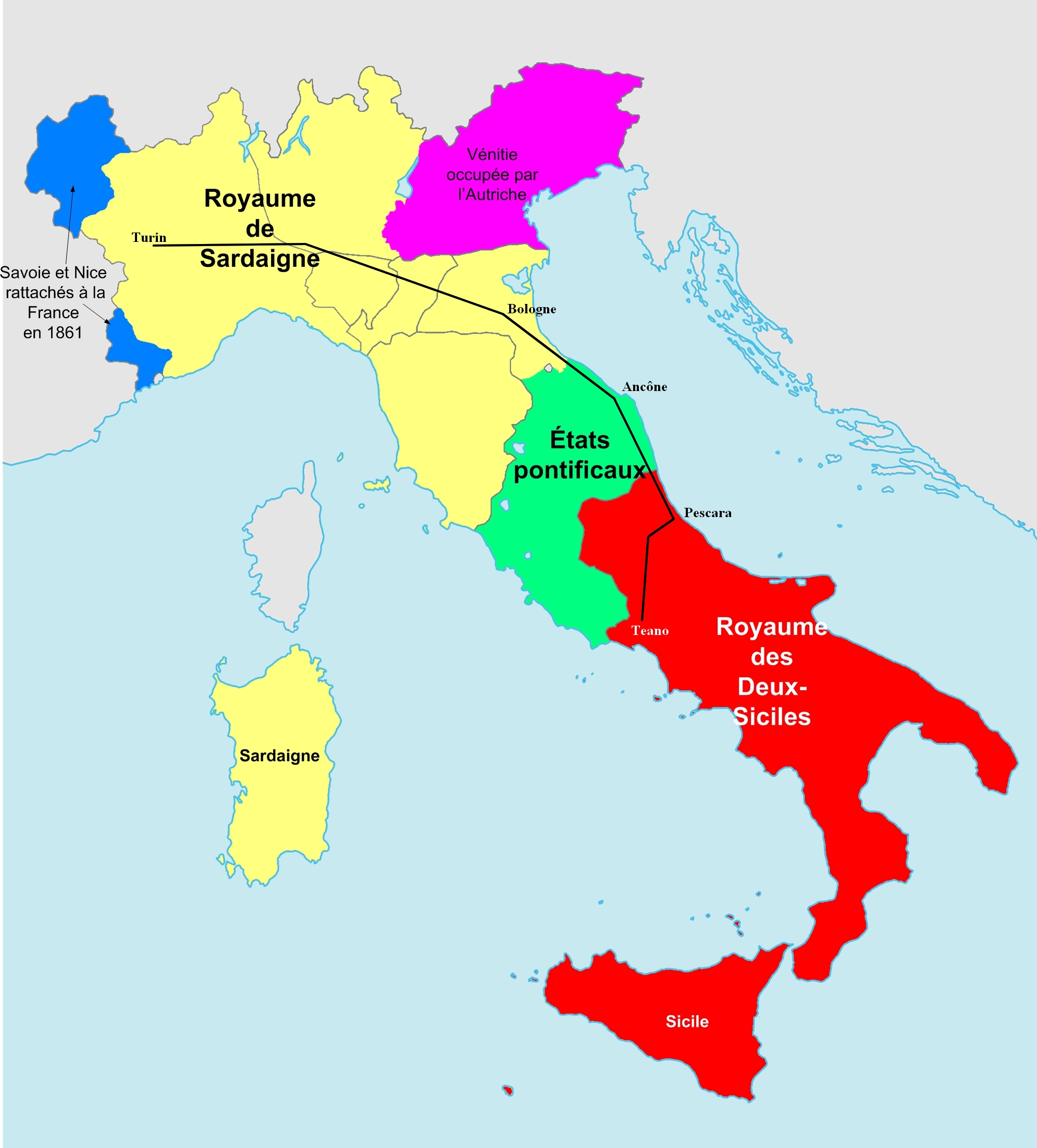
The invasion of the Papal States by the Kingdom of Piedmont-Sardinia

== Aftermath ==
=== Proclamation of the Kingdom of Italy ===
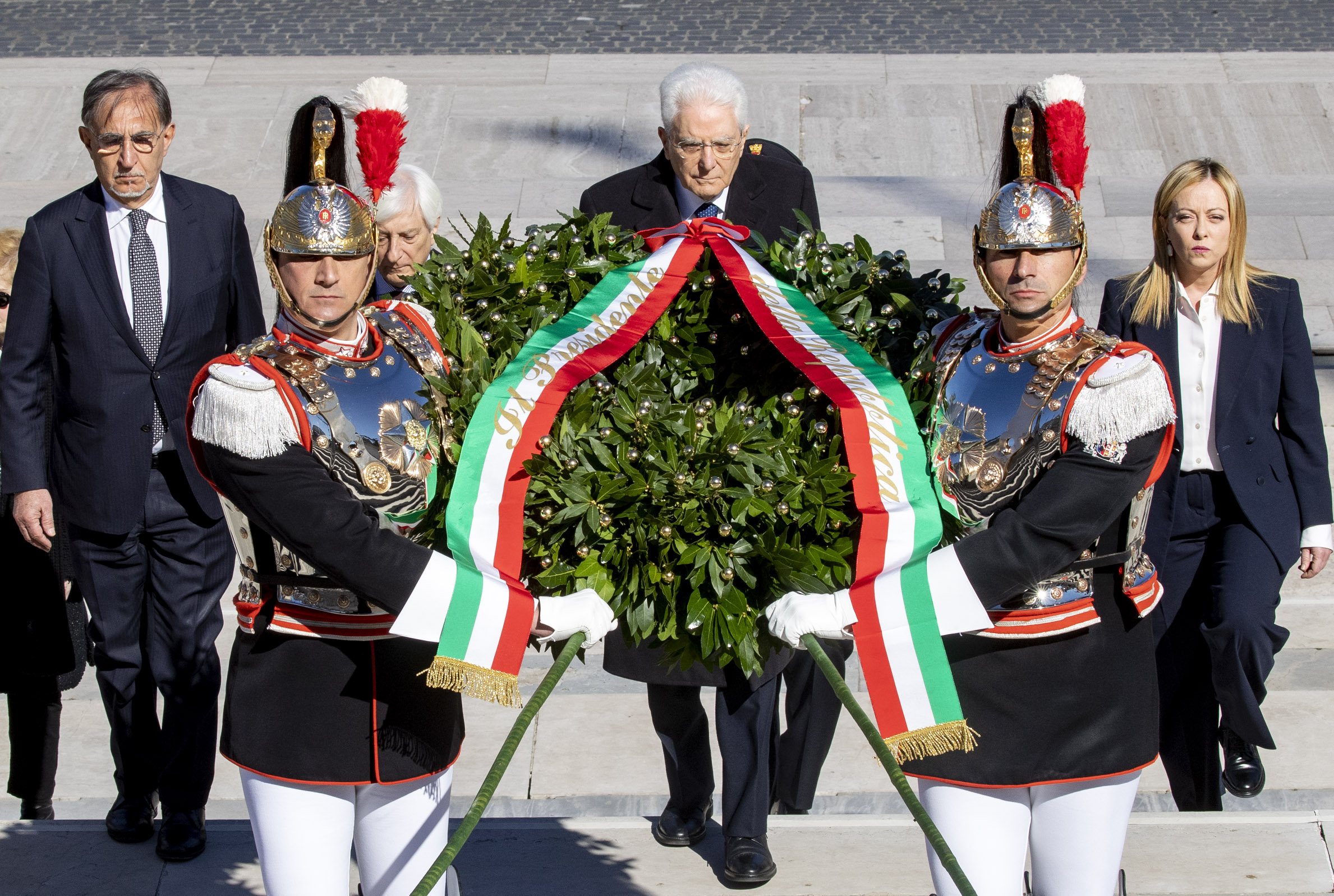
Most important officers of the Italian State paying homage to the Italian Unknown Soldier at Victor Emmanuel II Monument in Rome on 17 March 2023 on the occasion of the 162nd anniversary of the unification of Italy

On the basis of the annexation of the plebiscites of October 1860, and following the capitulations of the fortresses of Gaeta and Messina on 17 March 1861, while the fortress of Civitella del Tronto, despite the siege surrendered three days later, the Kingdom of unified Italy was proclaimed, including the southern regions. On 7 November King Victor Emmanuel II entered Naples. In the same month, Marche and Umbria also chose to join the Kingdom of Italy with a plebiscite.

Thus, once the Italian peninsula was unified, Victor Emmanuel II could be proclaimed King of Italy by the newly elected Italian parliament gathered in Turin. The newly proclaimed Kingdom of Italy preserved the regulatory and constitutional apparatus of the previous Kingdom of Piedmont-Sardinia, with the constitution (Statuto Albertino) definitively extended to all the provinces of the new kingdom.

Italy celebrates the anniversary of the unification every 50 years, on 17 March (the date of proclamation of the Kingdom of Italy). The anniversary occurred in 1911 (50th), 1961 (100th), 2011 (150th) and 2021 (160th) with several celebrations throughout the country. While remaining a working day, 17 March is considered a "day promoting the values linked to national identity". The National Unity and Armed Forces Day, celebrated on 4 November, commemorates the end of World War I with the Armistice of Villa Giusti, a war event considered to complete the process of unification of Italy.

The extension of the laws and regulations of the Kingdom of Piedmont-Sardinia to all annexed territories, created controversy with supporters of federalism such as Carlo Cattaneo and of a broader regional administrative autonomy, in particular in the territories of the former Kingdom of the Two Sicilies where different traditions were present, which created problems for northern administrators.

"Once Italy is made, Italians must be made" (in Italian Fatta l'Italia, bisogna fare gli italiani). This motto, attributed by most to Massimo d'Azeglio but by some to Ferdinando Martini, underlines the important and difficult task that awaited the government of the young kingdom. In fact, Massimo d'Azeglio glimpsed both the limits of reunification and the limitations of the Savoy leadership, so much so that he proposed his own personal solution both from a constitutional (federal state) and economic (liberal economy) point of view, to overcome the profound differences that were present in the various Italian regions. In the following years, due to the internal difficulties that the new unified state had to face, many Italians, especially from the southern regions, decided to emigrate, especially to the Americas and Australia.

=== Repercussions on diplomatic relations ===
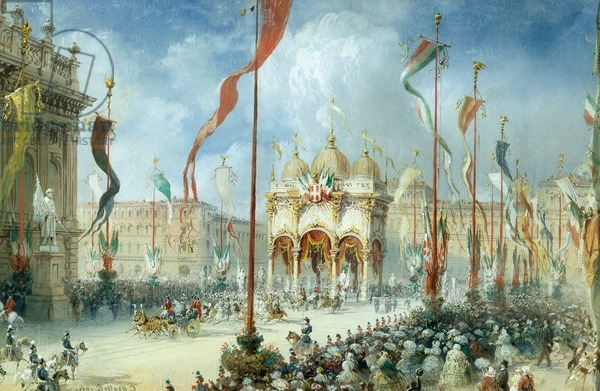
Carlo Bossoli: the royal procession at the opening of the Parliament of the Kingdom of Italy

The disapproval of the various European states culminated in the direct participation of the Sardinian army in the Expedition of the Thousand. In reaction, Spain and the Russian Empire interrupted diplomatic relations with the Kingdom of Piedmont-Sardinia, while the Austrian Empire, which had not maintained relations with this country since 1859, after the Second Italian War of Independence, sent its troops to the Mincio border. France made no hostile statements, but recalled its ambassador. Queen Victoria and her prime minister John Russell convinced the Kingdom of Prussia not to hinder the ongoing process of Italian unification. On 26 October 1860, the same day as the meeting in Teano between the king and Giuseppe Garibaldi, Austria organized a congress in Warsaw to apply measures against the Kingdom of Piedmont-Sardinia, without success; held back by this crisis, Cavour was unable to be present at Teano.

After the creation of the Kingdom of Italy, the United Kingdom and the Swiss Confederation were the first to recognize the new state (30 March 1861), followed by the United States on 13 April. France negotiated the presence of French troops in Rome and recognized the Kingdom of Italy on 15 June, shortly after Cavour's death. Portugal recognized on 27 June, followed by Greece, the Ottoman Empire and the Scandinavian countries. Recognition by the Netherlands and Belgium occurred in two phases; they recognized the new title of Victor Emmanuel II in July, then the kingdom in November, after a long clash between conservatives and liberals in the Belgian parliament over the latter.

=== Fate of the fighters ===
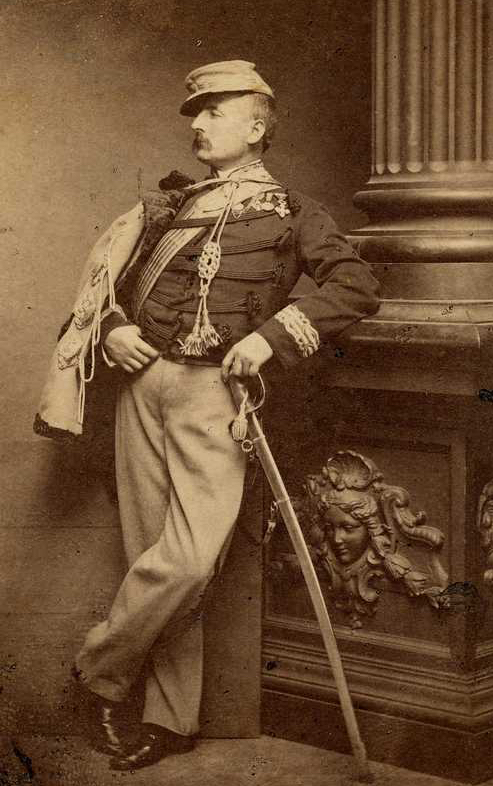
Nino Bixio, c. 1860

The incorporation of the Bourbon army into the army of the new Kingdom of Italy was immediately considered fundamental for the construction of a national identity. Furthermore, strengthening the national army seemed necessary, in view of an imminent war against Austria.

The officers and the troops of the dissolved land and naval forces of the Kingdom of the Two Sicilies were forced to enlist in the army and navy of the Kingdom of Italy maintaining their rank. Those who refused to take the oath to the new king and remained loyal to Francis II were deported to the prison camps of Alessandria, San Maurizio Canavese and Fenestrelle Fort, the best known of these camps, where most of the prisoners died of hunger or disease. This narrative, spread by neo-bourbonian revisionist in the 1990s, has been definitively denied by more recent studies; the Bourbon prisoners who passed through Fenestrelle were 1,186, the duration of imprisonment was three weeks and the deaths, due to illness or consequences of the wounds, were only five.

Other soldiers managed to hide and continued to fight for the independence of the Two Sicilies by joining the brigands. Unlike the Bourbon officers, the rank of Giuseppe Garibaldi's officers are recognized only in very rare cases, while the majority of Garibaldi commanders played an important role in the Italian army: Nino Bixio, the Neapolitan Enrico Cosenz, and Giuseppe Sirtori. Even among those who joined Garibaldi during the expedition, the disappointment was such for some, like Carmine Crocco, that they embraced the cause of brigandage.

=== Disappointment with the unification ===
In the aftermath of unification, most of the expectations raised by the Expedition of the Thousand were disappointed by the newly established unitary state, especially in Sicily. After believing that Giuseppe Garibaldi, who conveyed the image of protector of the oppressed, would improve their living conditions, farmers and the poorest sections of the population instead had to face higher taxes and compulsory conscription.

Many liberals of the Kingdom of the Two Sicilies who responded to the appeal for the unification of Italy were disappointed as the political situation remained substantially unchanged since the development achieved under Bourbon rule suddenly stopped. The clergy were disappointed, both by the loss of Umbria and the Marche belonging to the Papal State, and by the frequent expropriations of ecclesiastical assets, the suppression of religious orders and the closure of numerous schools of social utility.

== Legacy ==
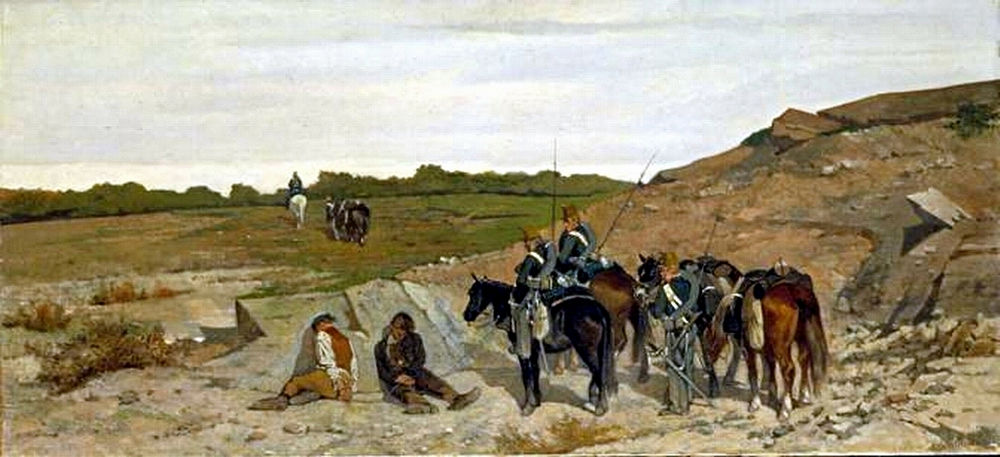
An episode of brigantaggio in 1864

The Expedition of the Thousand has traditionally been one of the most celebrated events of the Italian Risorgimento, the process of the unification of Italy.

In the following years, the rise of local resistance (the so-called brigantaggio or brigandage), required at one point the presence of some 140,000 Piedmontese troops to maintain control of the former Kingdom of the Two Sicilies. Traditionally, the handling of the brigantaggio has received negative judgement by Italian historians, in strict contrast with the heroism attributed to Giuseppe Garibaldi and his followers. The English historian Denis Mack Smith, for example, points out the deficiencies and reticence of the sources available for the period of 1861–1946, but the same historian also pointed out the backwardness of the Kingdom of the Two Sicilies at the time of the unification.

The expedition, moreover, obtained the support of the powerful great landowners of southern Italy in exchange for the promise that their properties be left intact in the upcoming political settlement. Numerous Sicilian peasants, however, had joined the Mille hoping instead for a redistribution of the land to the people working it. The consequences of this misunderstanding became evident at Bronte.

== Historiography ==
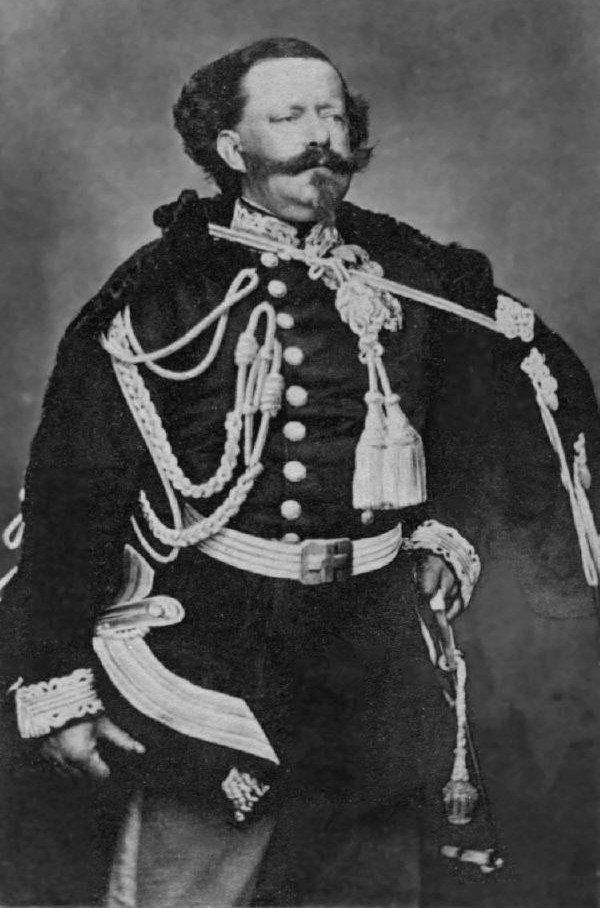
Victor Emmanuel II, the first king of unified Italy

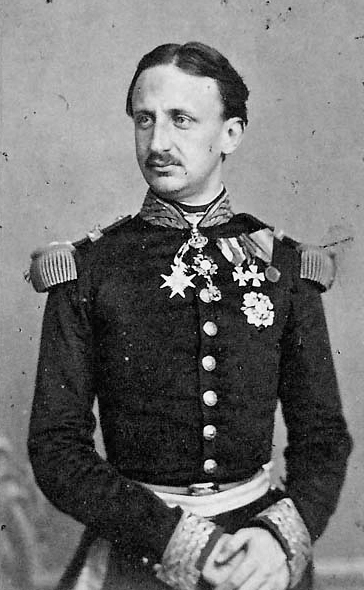
Francis II, the last King of Two Sicilies

The Expedition of the Thousand constitutes an essential stage in the history of the Italian state and has given rise to numerous historiographical controversies. Some historians see in Giuseppe Garibaldi's enterprise the origin of complex phenomena such as post-unification brigandage, the north-south imbalance, the absent emigration in the South before unification and the Southern Question.

Some schools of thought believe that traditional historiography has proposed a hagiographic vision of the Expedition of the Thousand, to be linked to the damnatio memoriae that struck the fallen Bourbon dynasty and to the violent repression of brigandage by the new Kingdom of Italy. In the first decade of unity a real civil war broke out, and the "pacification" of the dissident provinces required as many as 120,000 soldiers, the suspension of civil rights (Pica law), the exercise of retaliation on the civilian population, the destruction and the sacking of entire villages, as in Pontelandolfo and Casalduni. Anti-Savoy brigandage was a phenomenon almost exclusively linked to Southern Italy, and did not occur in the other states annexed by force, from the Center or the North.

Francesco Saverio Nitti, states that brigandage was an endemic phenomenon in the South before the unification of Italy: "Every part of Europe had brigands and criminals, who in times of war and misfortune dominated the countryside and made themselves outlaws [ ...] but there was only one country in Europe where banditry has always existed [...] a country where banditry for several centuries can resemble an immense river of blood and hatred [...] a country where for centuries the monarchy has it is based on banditry, which has become like a historical agent, this country is Southern Italy".

Likewise, the thesis that sees the south as hostile to the Savoys after the unification of Italy does not explain that, during the birth of the Italian Republic in the referendum of 2 June 1946, the south voted en masse in favor of the monarchy of the Savoys, while the North voted overwhelmingly for the republic. In the period 1946–1972, the monarchist parties (later merged into the Italian Democratic Party of Monarchical Unity (PDIUM)) acquired fame especially in the South and in Naples, where, during the 1946 referendum, several Two Sicilies citizens died during the clashes between republicans and monarchists, and in particular the massacre in Via Medina, in Naples.

In the past and in recent times, according to certain interpretations, some of Garibaldi's victories in the 1860–61 Expedition were attributed not to Garibaldi's actions, but to the supposed corruption of several high-ranking Bourbon officers, who in exchange for financial compensation would have allowed the victory on the field. In reality, the Bourbon generals were divided by rivalries and jealousies, with a tendency to dodge responsibilities to overcome, as best they could, that difficult moment, not being convinced that it was worth fighting at the risk of life or reputation for a king who was neither loved nor feared. Even the pro-Bourbon historian Giacinto de' Sivo, in his work: History of the Two Sicilies from 1847 to 1861, volume III - book 18, described in negative terms the situation of the armed forces of the Kingdom of the two Sicilies at the time of the events.

== Filmography ==
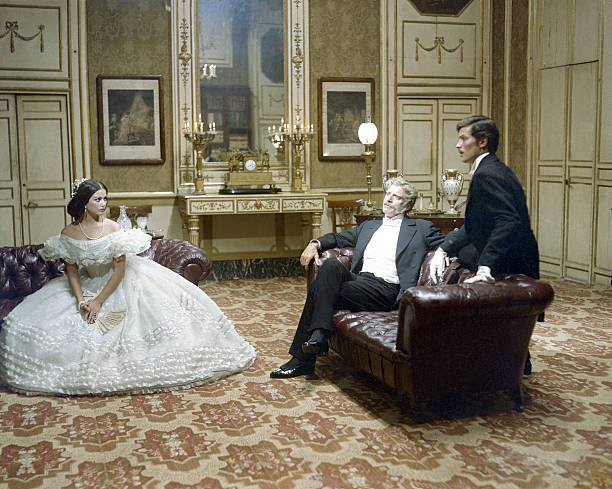
A scene from the film The Leopard by Luchino Visconti (1963), starring Burt Lancaster, Alain Delon and Claudia Cardinale

- 1860 by Alessandro Blasetti (1934)
- A Garibaldian in the Convent by Vittorio De Sica (1942)
- Senso by Luchino Visconti (1954)
- Garibaldi by Roberto Rossellini (1960)
- The Leopard by Luchino Visconti (1963)
- Bronte: cronaca di un massacro che i libri di storia non hanno raccontato by Florestano Vancini (1972)
- Li chiamarono... briganti! by Pasquale Squitieri (1999)
- We Believed by Mario Martone (2010)

== Music ==
- "Inno di Garibaldi", written by Luigi Mercantini and music by Alessio Oliverio (1858)
- "Camicia Rossa", written by Rocco Traversa and music by Luigi Pantaleoni (1860)
- "Garibaldi blues", written and sung by Bruno Lauzi (1965)
- "Camicie Rosse", written by Massimo Bubola and sung by Fiorella Mannoia (1994)
- "Mille", written and sung by Eugenio Bennato (2012)

== See also ==
- Kingdom of the Two Sicilies
- Plebiscites on Italian Unity
- Post-Unification Italian Brigandage
- Proclamation of the Kingdom of Italy
- Southern Italy
- Timeline of the unification of Italy
- Unification of Italy
