= Rosolino Pilo =

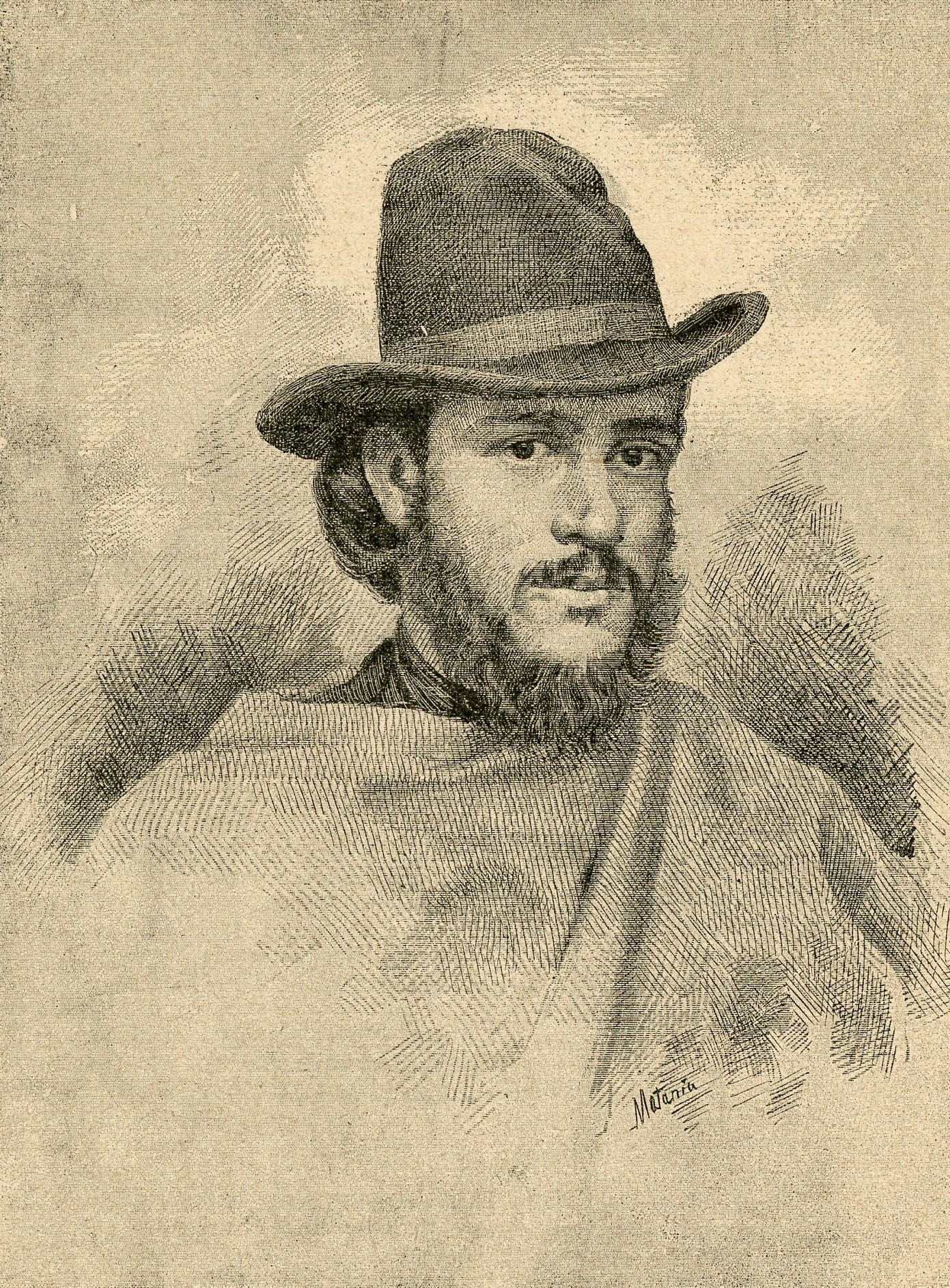
Portrait, 1892

Rosolino Pilo, or Rosalino Pilo (Palermo, 15 July 1820 – San Martino delle Scale, 21 May 1860) was an Italian patriot.

== Life ==
He was the fourth son of Count Gerolamo di Capaci of the Pilo family, and Antonia Gioeni of the Princes of Bologna and Petrulla.

While his older brother, Count Capaci, was a fervent supporter of the Bourbons, who even followed King Francis II into exile in Rome, Rosolino Pilo took part in the Sicilian revolution of 1848

When the liberals seized Palermo, he took command of the artillery until the city was forced to capitulate. Due to the repression and failure of the insurrection, Pilo went into exile in Marseille and later in Genoa. There he met Giuseppe Mazzini thanks to his friendship with the Orlando family, and he renewed contacts with the other Sicilian exiles.

In 1853, in Milan Uprising, Pilo was in Turin to help escape the conspirators. He met Giuseppe Piolti, a Mazzinian agent with whom he shared the insurrectional principles. Pilo preferred the guerrilla warfare and, in the summer of 1856, he had contacts with Carlo Pisacane to open a front of revolt in Sicily.

At the beginning of December, Pilo embarked in Genoa with destination Malta to join the revolt commanded by Baron Francesco Bentivegna. However, upon arriving in Malta, he learned of the failure of the attempt and could not do otherwise than return to Genoa. There he met Carlo Pisacane and enthusiastically adhered to his guerrilla project that would have left Sapri to advance in Campania and reach Naples; a campaign that crashed. Pisacane went back to London and Pilo took refuge in Malta.

During the Expedition of the Thousand led by Giuseppe Garibaldi in 1860, Pilo joined the Garibaldian group for the Siege of Palermo, but he was killed six days before the city was taken.

== Bibliography ==
- Ufficio Storico Stato Maggiore Esercito. Arsano Aristite. Come morì Rosolino Pilo: Memorie Storico-Militari, vol. X. Anno 1914. Roma, 1914, p. 101-118.
- R. Molteleone, Cospiratori, Guerriglieri, Briganti. Storie dell’altro Risorgimento, Einaudi Ragazzi Storia, Trieste 1995.
