= Timeline of the unification of Italy =

This is a timeline of the unification of Italy.

- 1849 – August 24: Venice falls to Austrian forces that have crushed the rebellion in Venetia
- 1858 – Meeting at Plombieres: Napoleon III and Cavour decide to stage a war with Austria, in return for Piedmont gaining Lombardy, Venetia, Parma and Modena, and France gaining Savoy and Nice.
- 1859 – November 4: Conte Camillo Benso di Cavour to Venetia
  - July 11: Napoleon III meets with Franz Joseph (Austria) and backs out of the war. Among other land negotiations, Lombardy will be transferred to Sardinia
  - November 10: Treaty of Zurich ends conflict in northern Italy for a time; Sardinia occupies some central Italian states
  - December: Tuscany, Parma, Modena, and some other states join the United Provinces of Central Italy, and seek annexation by Sardinia
- 1860 – March 20: Sardinia annexes central Italian states by giving Nice and Savoy to the French, now only four states remain in Italy: Austrians in Venetia, the Papal States, the Kingdom of Piedmont-Sardinia, and the Kingdom of the Two Sicilies
  - February 18: Victor Emmanuel II assumes title of King of Italy with an Italian parliament under him
  - May 6: Garibaldi and about a thousand Italian volunteers leave Genoa, and on
  - May 11: land near Marsala on the west coast of Sicily
  - May 14: After many victories, Garibaldi names himself dictator of Sicily
  - May 27: With British help Garibaldi seizes capital of Palermo
  - August 18: Basilicata is the first continental province to declare the fall of Francis II.
  - September 2: Garibaldi entered Basilicata through Rotonda, encountering no difficulty. The provincial government raised a "Lucanian brigade", which followed Garibaldi to Naples.
  - September 7: After victories throughout Sicily and Italian mainland, Garibaldi is welcomed into Naples.
  - October : Victor Emmanuel II leads Sardinian forces through the Papal States south to meet Garibaldi in Naples, Garibaldi hands over his power to Victor Emmanuel II
- 1861
  - March 17: Official Proclamation of the Kingdom of Italy
  - June 6: Camillo di Cavour dies after seeing his life's work almost fulfilled, with only Venetia, and the Papal States not under Italian control
- 1862
  - June: Being frustrated with inaction against the Papal States, Garibaldi sails from Genoa to Palermo to gather volunteers for a Rome expedition
  - August 14: Garibaldi sails for Melito on the southern coast of Italy and vows to march to Rome
  - August 28: Garibaldi meets government troops at Aspromonte, and is honorably imprisoned, with his army being disbanded, however Garibaldi is soon released
- 1864 – September 15: Victor Emmanuel II meets with Napoleon III at the September Convention, Napoleon III agrees to withdraw French troops from the Papal States within 2 years
- 1865 – Capital moves from Turin to Florence
- 1866 – June 20: Italy enters the Austro-Prussian war against Austria with Prussia promising Venetia if they win
  - June 24: Italian forces under Victor Emmanuel II are defeated at Custoza
  - July 21: Italian forces under Garibaldi are victorious against Austria at Bezzecca, and move forward into Venetia
  - July 26: Prussia signs armistice with Austria
  - August 12: Italy ends war with Austria after Prussia signs armistice
  - October 12: Emperor Franz Joseph cedes Venetia to Napoleon III for not entering the war, who then cedes it to Italy
- 1867 – October: Garibaldi seeks Rome and Papal States but fails, revolutions inside Rome are also suppressed
- 1870 – July: With the outbreak of the Franco-Prussian war, Napoleon III calls back troops from Rome
  - September 10: Victor Emmanuel II sends Count Ponza di San Martino with a letter to the Pope proposing a peaceful entrance of the Italian army into Rome, but the Pope rejects the letter and the Count leaves the next day
  - September 11: Italian Army slowly advances toward Rome
  - September 20: Italian army forcefully enters Rome with some casualties and, after a plebiscite, Rome is annexed by the Kingdom of Italy
- 1871 – June: The capital of the Kingdom of Italy is officially moved from Florence to Rome
