= Missori =

Missori may refer to:

- Missori (Milan Metro), a station on the Milan Metro in Italy
- Filippo Missori (b. 2004), Italian footballer
- Giuseppe Missori (1829–1911), Italian patriot, soldier, and politician
- Italian destroyer Giuseppe Missori, an Italian destroyer commissioned in 1915 and reclassified as a torpedo boat in 1929

== See also ==
- Missouri, 24th state of the United States, located in the Midwest region of the U.S.
