= Castello di Milazzo =

Castle and citadel in Milazzo, Italy

- Milazzo, Sicily, Italy
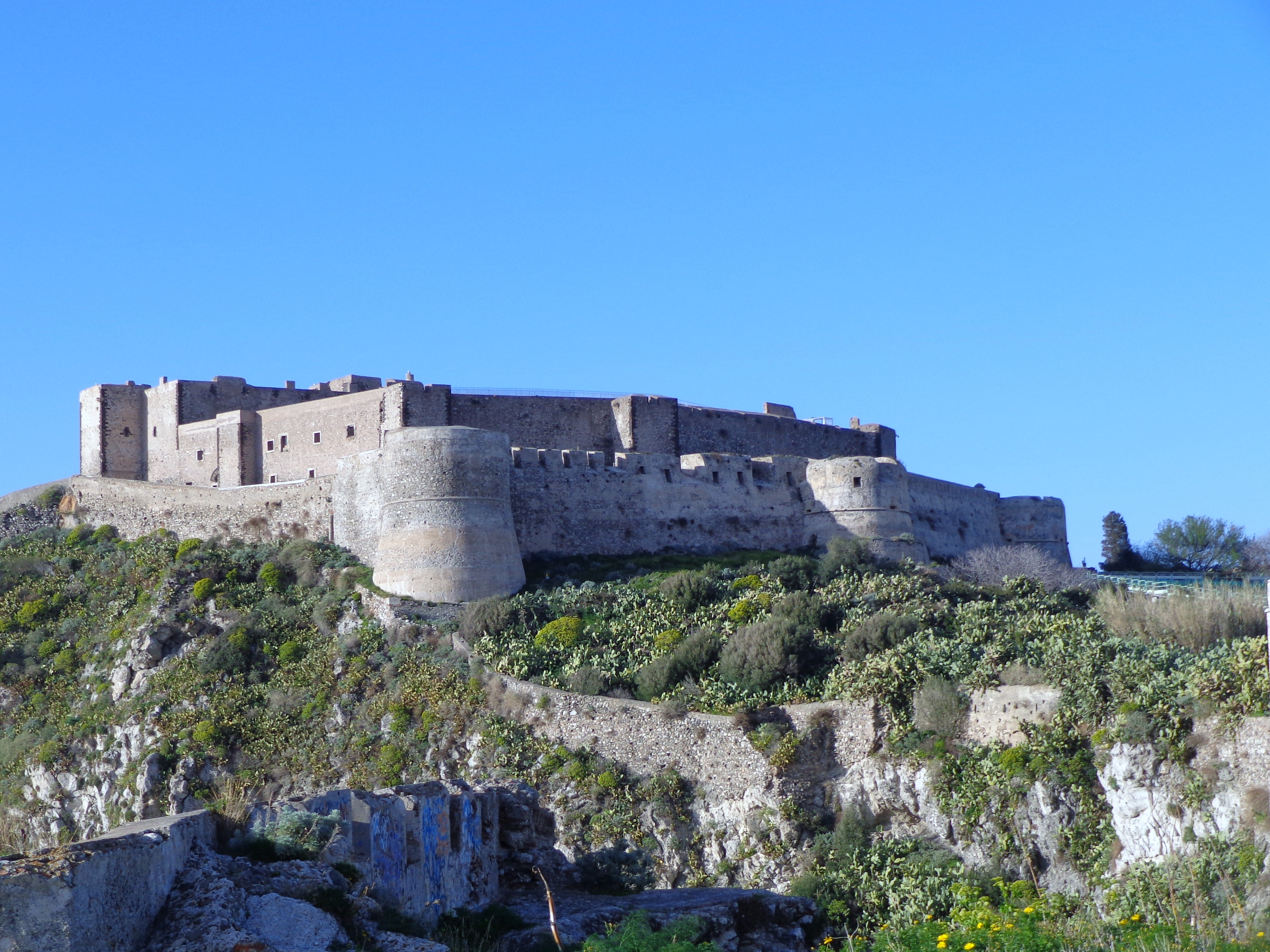
- View of the Castello di Milazzo

Site information
- Type: Castle and citadel
- Owner: Comune di Milazzo
- Open to the public: Yes
- Condition: Intact

Location
- Coordinates: 38°13′52.5″N 15°14′27.9″E
- Area: 12,070 m^{2} (129,900 sq ft)

Site history
- Built: c. 4000 BC (first fortifications); 12th–17th centuries (present castle)
- Built by: Kingdom of Sicily (under Norman, Swabian, Aragonese and Spanish rule)
- Materials: Lava and stone

The Castello di Milazzo (English: Milazzo Castle) is a castle and citadel in Milazzo, Sicily. It is located on the summit of a hill overlooking the town, on a site first fortified in the Neolithic era. The Greeks modified it into an acropolis, and it was later enlarged into a castrum by the Romans and Byzantines. The Normans built a castle, which was further modified and enlarged during the Medieval and Early Modern periods. It is now in good condition, and open to the public.

The castle was built as a result of the strategic importance of the Milazzo peninsula, which commands the Gulf of Patti, the body of water that separates Sicily from the Aeolian Islands. It also commands one of Sicily's most important natural harbours.

== History ==
=== Antiquity ===
The first fortifications on the site of the Castello di Milazzo were built in around 4000 BC, during the Neolithic. The Greeks built an acropolis in the 8th or 7th centuries BC, and the Romans and Byzantines modified the site into a castrum.

Ancient coins, including those of the Mamertines, have been found recently inside the castle's perimeter.

=== Norman and Swabian rule ===
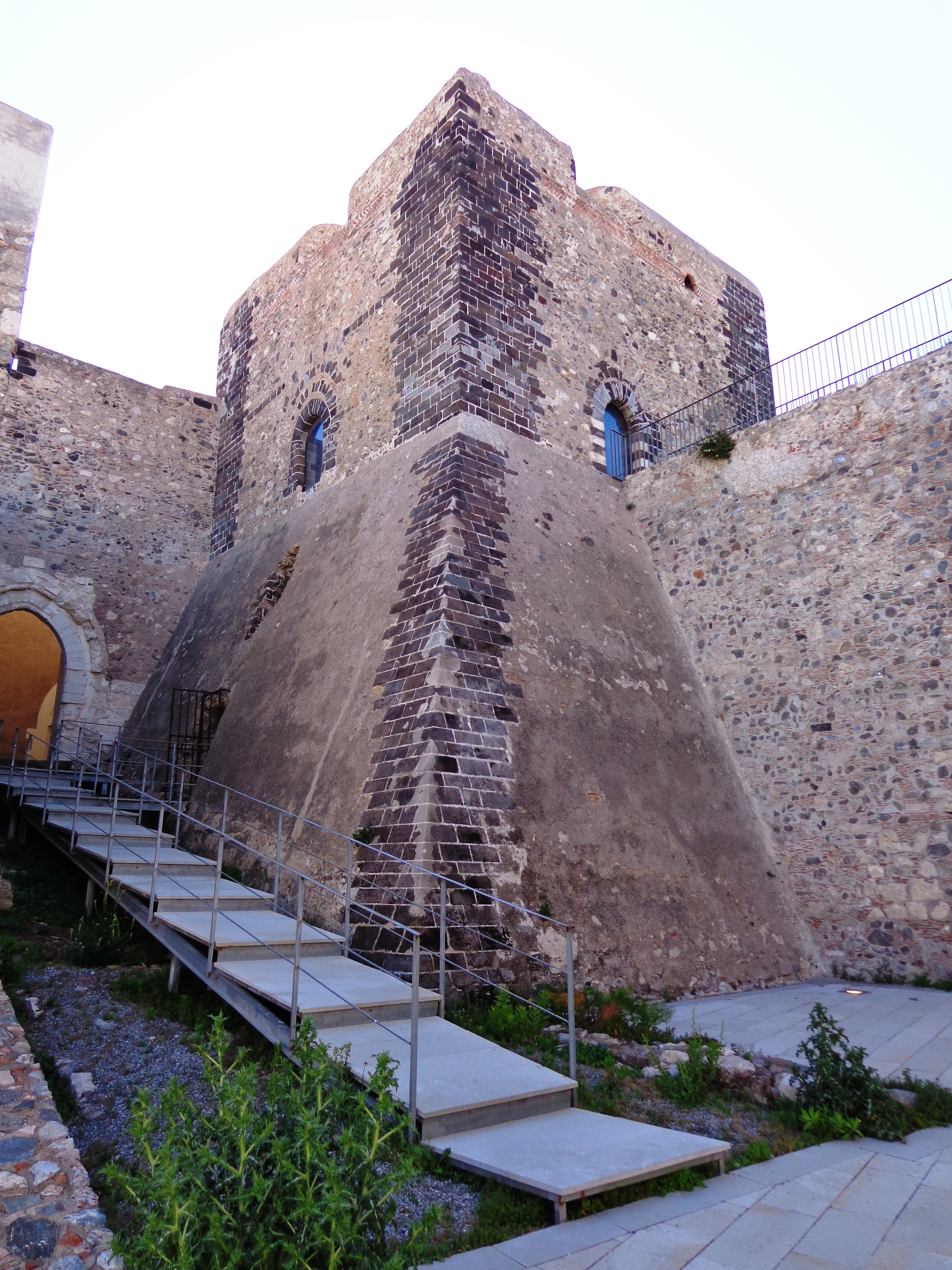
The Torre Saracena, which was built by the Normans

the castle was built by the Normans and later enlarged by the Swabians. The castle was extensively modified during the reign of Frederick II of Hohenstaufen.

In 1295, the Sicilian Parliament met here.

=== Aragonese and Spanish rule ===
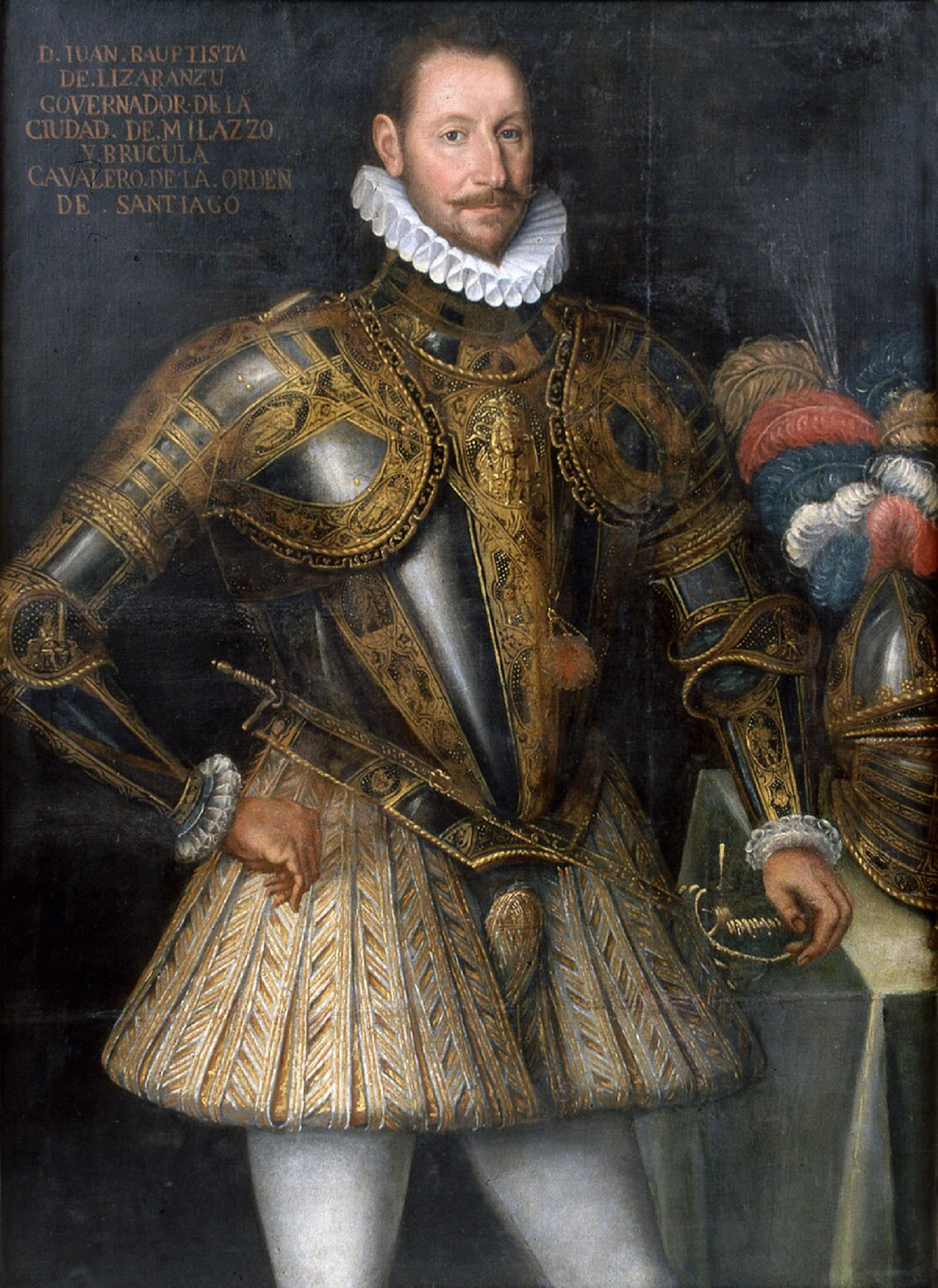
Portrait of Giovan Battista De Lizaranzu, governor of the Castle

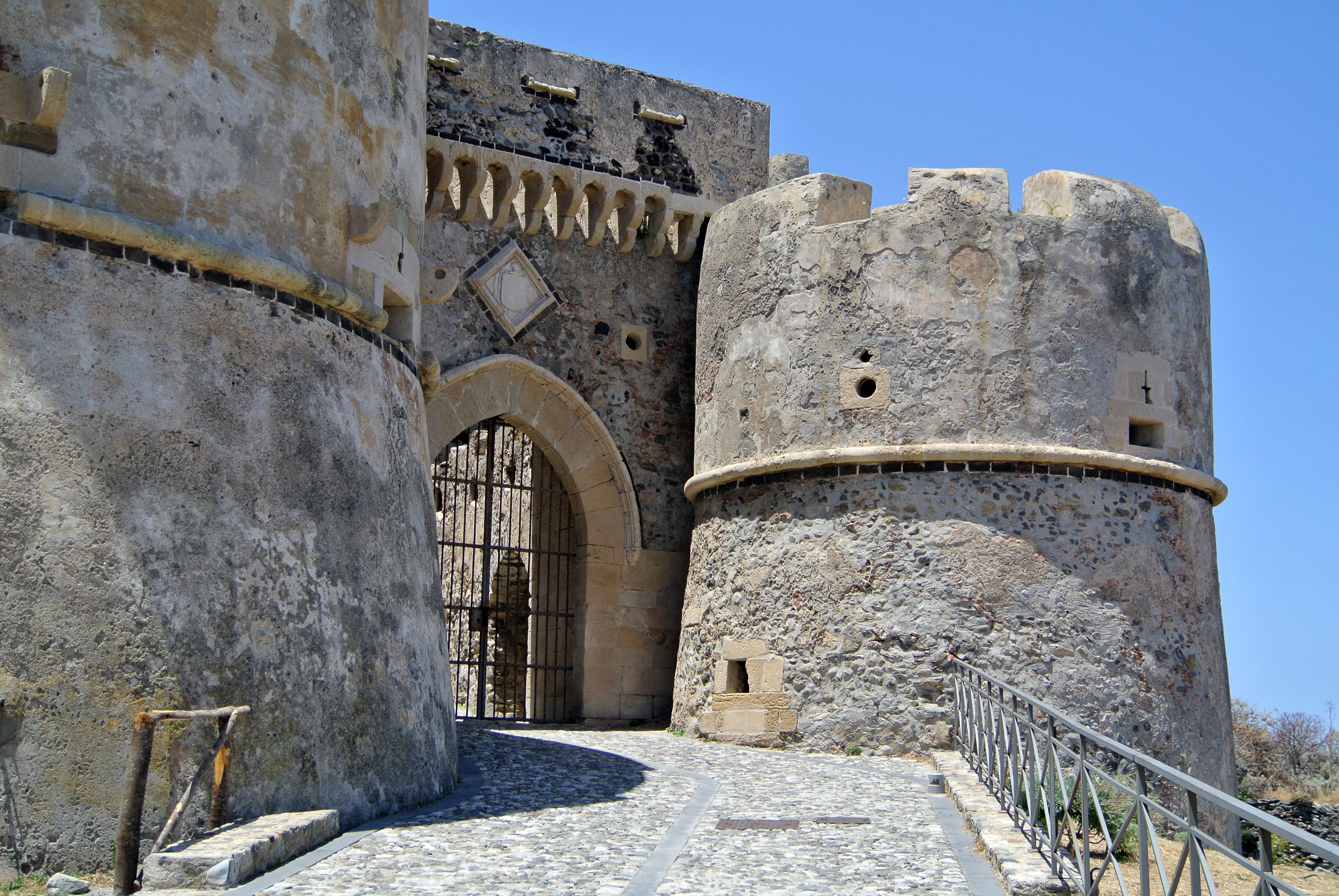
Aragonese gate to the castle

Between 1496 and 1508, the Aragonese built walls with six semi-circular bastions, encircling the original medieval castle. They were designed by the architect Baldiri Meteli.

Between 1525 and 1540, the Spanish built bastioned fortifications around the Aragonese walls and the settlement which surrounded it, expanding the castle into a citadel. The new fortifications were designed by the military engineers Pietro Antonio Tomasello and Antonio Ferramolino. In 1577 by Tibúrcio Spannocchi and in 1585 there was a reconstruction by Camillo Camilliani and after by Pietro Novelli. Some outworks were added in the 17th century. Several civil buildings began to be built within the walls of the castle, including the old cathedral and various palaces.

=== 18th to 20th centuries ===
The castle was in Habsburg hands in the first half of the 18th century, before being taken over by the Bourbons. The latter retained the castle until they lost Milazzo to Giuseppe Garibaldi in 1860. The castle was subsequently converted into a prison in 1880, and underwent a number of alterations. The prison closed in 1959 and the castle remained abandoned for a couple of decades.

=== Recent history ===
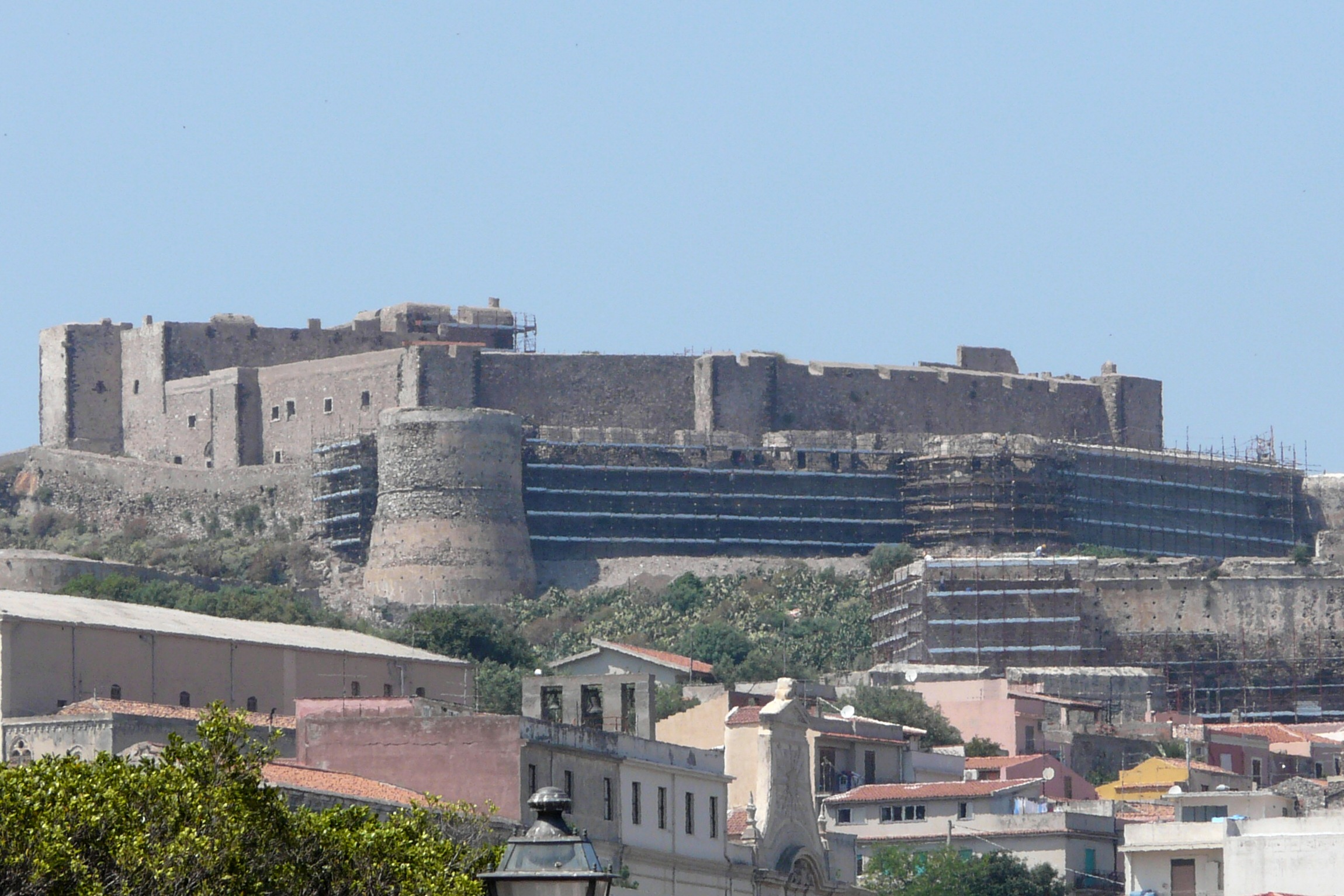
The Castello di Milazzo being restored in 2009

After many years of neglect and deterioration, the castle was restored between 1991 and 2002, and again between 2008 and 2010. Today, it is in good condition and is open to the public.

== Layout ==
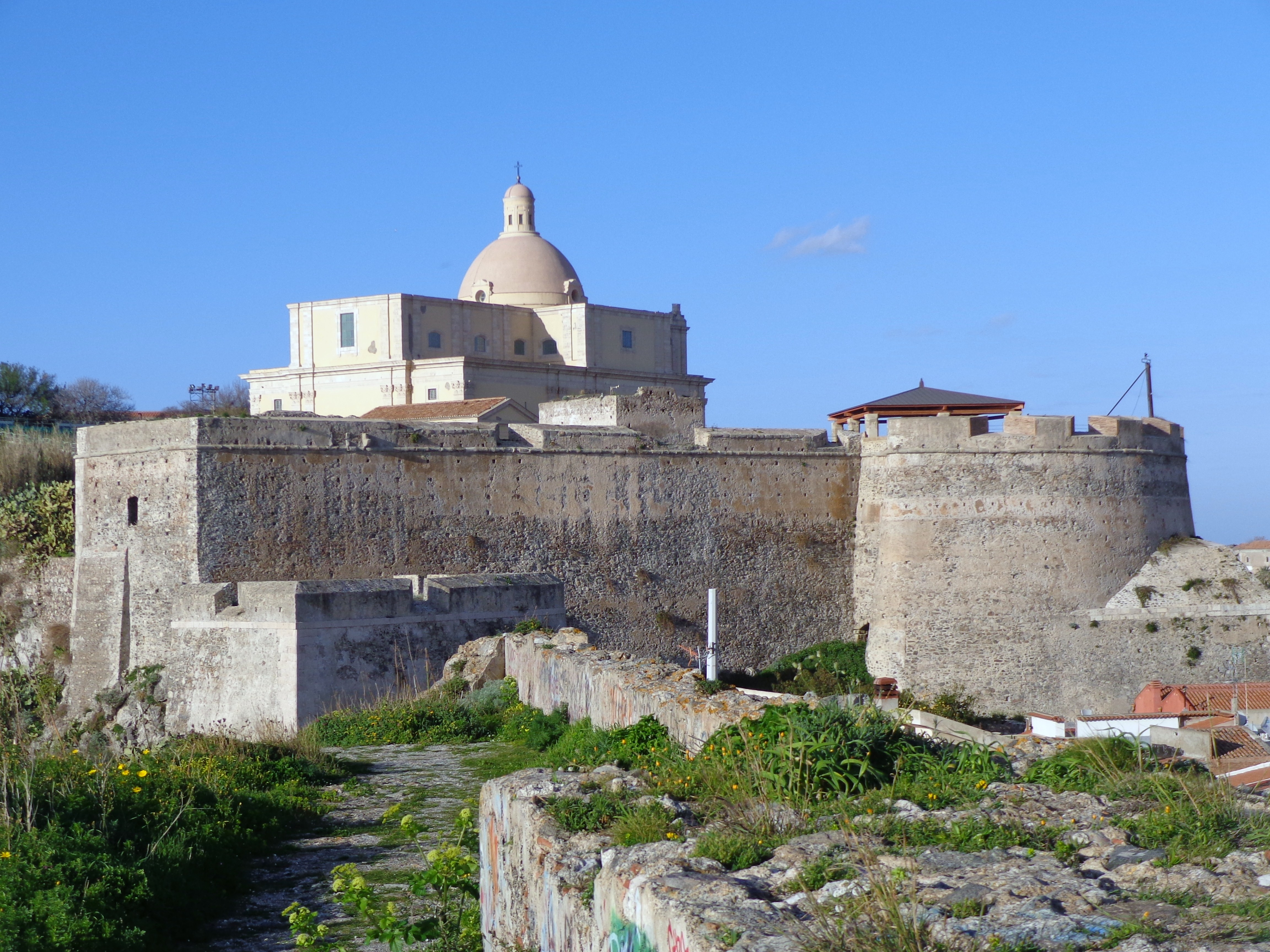
The Bastione di Santa Maria

Although it is commonly called a castle, the Castello di Milazzo is more precisely a fortified town or citadel, since it housed several public and private edifices, such as a cathedral and a Benedictine convent. The citadel is located on top of a hill, which gradually slopes towards the town and its harbour. The south-eastern side of the castle consists of several defensive walls, while its north-western side is protected by a natural cliff-face.

The keep of the castle is the Torre Saracena (Saracen Tower), which is also the oldest part of the fortification. It was built either by Normans, but like the rest of the castle, it was modified over the years until the 16th century. The keep is surrounded by walls with protruding square-shaped towers, which were built by the Swabians. These are in turn surrounded by the Aragonese Wall (Italian: Cinta Aragonese), which contains semi-circular bastions.

The Aragonese Wall is surrounded by the 16th century Spanish Wall (Italian: Cinta Spagnola), which contains the following bastions:

- Bastione di Santa Maria – a semi-circular bastion at the southern end of the castle, containing the main entrance. It was named after a church dedicated to St. Mary which was partially demolished to make way for the bastion.
- Bastione delle Isole – an arrow-shaped bastion at the eastern end of the castle. It was designed by Antonio Ferramolino, and contains a number of countermines.

The walls are protected by ravelins and other outworks which were built in the 17th century.

A gallery with a barrel vault then leads to an internal courtyard, after which is the Old Duomo (cathedral), built from 1607. The Benedictine convent was built during the same period. The ruins of the Palazzo dei Giurati (Jurors' Palace) and of the older church of Santa Maria are also present.

== Bibliography ==
- Micale, Antonino (1982). Il Castello di Milazzo. Milazzo: Stes.
