= Ferdinando Beneventano del Bosco =

Two Sicilian general (1813–1881)

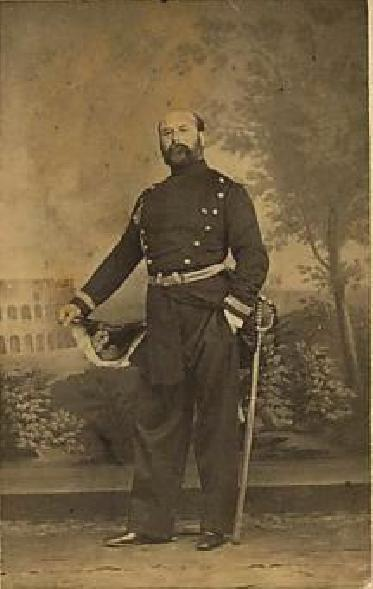
- Born: 3 March 1813; Palermo, Province of Palermo, Sicily
- Died: 8 January 1881 (aged 67); Naples, Campania, Italy
- Education: Nunziatella Military School
- Military career
- Allegiance: Two Sicilies
- Branch: Army of the Two Sicilies
- Service years: 1822–1881
- Rank: Brigadier General
- Conflicts: Sicilian revolution of 1848; Siege of Messina; Expedition of the Thousand; Italian Campaign; Siege of Gaeta; Sicilian Campaign; Battle of Milazzo

Ferdinando Beneventano del Bosco (3 March 1813 – 8 January 1881) was a Two Sicilian Brigadier General of the Army of the Two Sicilies. He was one of the few charismatic figures during the Expedition of the Thousand and a primary figure of Two Sicilian resistance against the Sardinian forces.

== Education and early career ==
Ferdinando was born on 3 March 1813, at Palermo as the son of Aloisio Beneventano del Bosco and Marianna Roscio who were nobility of Syracusan origins. At the age of nine, he enrolled in the Nunziatella Military School as a pupil. He began studying there at the age of twelve in 1825.

Del Bosco graduated in 1829 and was appointed second lieutenant within the 2nd Guard Grenadiers. He was then promoted to First Lieutenant in 1840 within the 2nd Infantry Regiment. With a strong-willed and aggressive character, endowed with a natural propensity for command, he had to temporarily leave his roles to take refuge in Malta since he had gone against the prohibition to participate in duels. He then returned to Naples after a pardon from King Ferdinando II of the Two Sicilies, he was able to continue his career and was promoted to Captain in 1848.

== Sicilian revolution of 1848 ==
He took part in the repression of the Sicilian revolution of 1848, during which he performed commendably by participating in the Siege of Messina, during which he suffered a slight wound. He obtained the praise of the general commander in chief of the Two Sicilian troops, Carlo Filangieri for his service in the revolution. During the assault on Taormina, he asked in vain to lead the first wave and at Catania, he was at the forefront of the attack on a barricade and achieved two important successes in sequence in the area of Monserrato and Punta Verde.

In 1850, del Bosco was among the few to be awarded the first class gold medal by King Ferdinando II which also made him the knight of the Order of Saint Ferdinand and of Merit and the Constantine Order of Saint Giorgio.

== Expedition of the Thousand ==
In 1858, he was promoted to major and he was in command of the battalion stationed in Monreale. In April 1860, he suppressed the Gancia Revolt and in May, against the Garibaldians during the Siege of Palermo.

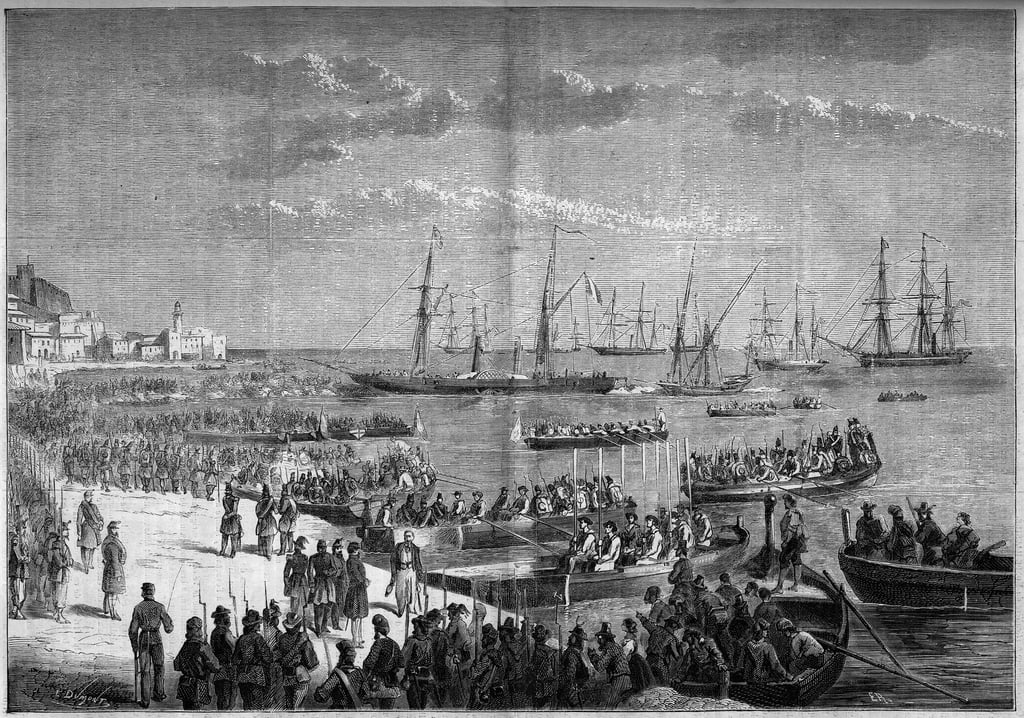
General Bosco evacuating Milazzo, Illustrated Times, 1860

Promoted to Colonel, he was sent to command three battalions to reinforce the fort of Milazzo and on 20 July he clashed with the Medici column in the Battle of Milazzo and was forced to take refuge in the fort until an officer sent from Naples negotiated the surrender with the Garibaldini. Del Bosco along with the Bourbon troops were able to embark for Naples, where he was promoted to Brigadier General. Arrested and immediately released upon Garibaldi's entry into Naples in November 1860, he went to the fortress of Gaeta to fight alongside Francesco II during the Siege of Gaeta.

Two months later however, there was the surrender and he followed Francesco II to Rome until he was expelled by Pope Pius IX from the Papal States in September 1861 and del Bosco continued to organize the anti-unification movement, strengthened by the reputation of having been one of the few Bourbon officers not to have fled before Garibaldi. After his expulsion from the Papal States, del Bosco would wander through various capitals until reaching Spain and Morocco. From there, his whereabouts remained unknown until his return to Naples at some point as he would die there on 8 January 1881.

== Legacy ==
On December 12, 2014, a street in Milazzo was named after del Bosco after the council headed by Mayor Carmelo Pino approved the resolution for the renaming.
