= Taberna Mylaensis =

- Origin: Sicily, Italia
- Genres: Italian folk music Music of Sicily; Pop folk Folk music Progressive folk
- Years active: 1975–present
- Website: www.tabernamylaensis.com

The band Taberna Mylaensis play popular ethnic music from Sicily.

== Biography ==
Discover the popular Sicilian music by the ensemble of Milazzo, the ancient town of Mylae.

Luciano Maio (born in 1950 in Milazzo, Sicily) has been a propagator of Sicilian culture all his life, as a poet, artist, painter, singer, fisherman, sculptor, lyricist, and as a composer.

In the early 1970s he founded 'Taberna Mylaensis' and initiated the recovery of the great traditional music of Sicily, on the wave of the student revolts of 1968 with its expectations for social renovation.

In the years to follow, 'Taberna Mylaensis' has had various line-ups, with Luciano Maio as its steady centre during which the band released 10 LPs and CDs.

The repertoire, which originally focused on protest songs, gradually shifted to a more traditional and contemporary approach. Sicily, the centre of the old Mediterranean world located on the crossroads of trade routes, has been influenced by Normans, Arabs, Greeks, French, Spanish, and the Maghreb culture. The music of Taberna Mylaensis bears traces of all these cultures. Luciano Maio's compositions are based on Sicilian and Mediterranean traditions and his lyrics (written in Sicilian language) often depict historical events.

== History ==
The Sicilian group Taberna Mylaensis, was found in 1975 in Milazzo (the antique city of Mylae) by Luciano Maio, composer and author of the music and lyrics, with the main purpose to recover the great Sicilian musical heritage which embraces several centuries - from 1500 until 1800 - of chants of labour, rage, protest and religious chants, adapted to the sounds coming from Arabic and African musical traditions. The long history of Taberna can be divided in three periods:

- 1975 - 1980: The repertoire consists in traditional songs and music based on research by Alberto Favara, Giuseppe Pitrè and Leonardo Vigo (end 1800).
- 1980 - 1996: Taberna combines its repertoire with new compositions.
- 1998–present day: the final phase inaugurated with the release of Taberna's album "L 'anima du munnu" in 1998 containing lyrics and music composed or re-elaborated exclusively by Luciano Maio.

In 1976 Taberna recorded the LP's "Fammi ristari" and "Populi e Santi" with record company RCA (now BMG) and the group accompanied Francesco de Gregori as support-act on his national tour. The group participated in various Italian television and radio programmes and a television-special produced by RAI 2 TV entirely dedicated to the group. In 1977 Taberna Mylaensis took part in a popfestival organized by the magazine "Re Nudo" at Parco Lambro in Milan. In 1978 Taberna tours the Netherlands where they would come back 2 years later to represent Italy on the Winterfolkfestival in Dordrecht and Arnhem. In 1981 Taberna signs a new record deal with Isola CGD and records folk rock LP "Gricalata". In 1984 Taberna Mylaensis represents Italy on POETRY INTERNATIONAL FESTIVAL in Rotterdam and performs in the Istituto Italiano di Cultura (Amsterdam) cultural division of the Italian embassy in the Netherlands. During that time the collaboration with the record company "PAN RECORDS" producer of world and ethnic music, begins and Taberna's cd's will be distributed around the world. Taberna's new project titled "L'Anima du Munnu" inspired Luciano Maio to re-elaborate a new poetic way to composing Sicilian popular music, that is not anymore the traditional way but by discovering the Mediterranean culture. Thus the music became ethnic folk music and Taberna received great success with its performance in Istanbul 's C.R.R.Concert Hall in 1998. In 2001 Taberna Mylaensis released the live cd "La chiami Sicilia" as a celebration of the 25 years of musical activities. In May 2004 Taberna receives the "Corrado Maranci" award for its contribution to and diffusion of the Sicilian culture and popular music. In June 2004 Taberna Mylaensis releases the new cd "E vinniru du mari...Federicu", a co-production between Pan Records and the Association Arte Sicilia.

== Musicians ==
- Luciano Maio - vocals, guitar, mandola, tamburo, marranzano
- Antonio Vasta - accordion, harmonica, piano, zampogna a paru (big bagpipe), vocals
- Antonio Putzu - flauti di canna, clarinet, soprano saxophone, vocals
- Vincenzo Castellana - tammorra, tambourines, djembé, darbuka, vocals
- Francesco Bongiorno - set percussions, tambourines, vocals

== Albums ==
- 1976 - Fammi ristari (RCA)
- 1977 - Populi e Santi (RCA)
- 1977 - Live Parco Lambro (RCA)
- 1980 - 19.770.558.88 cent. Per la libertá (Taberna)
- 1981 - Gricalata (Isola, CGD)
- 1996 - Allah Muntagna (PAN)
- 1997 - 23 Maggio (in memoria di Falcone e Borsellino) (TDS)
- 1998 - L'Anima du munnu (PAN)
- 1999 - Fango compilation (CNI)
- 2000 - Fammi ristari - Populi e Santi (TDS)
- 2001 - La Chiami Sicilia Live (PAN)
- 2004 - Vinniru du mari...Federicu (PAN)
