= Battle of Milazzo (1860) =

Battle in Sicily

- Part of Expedition of the Thousand
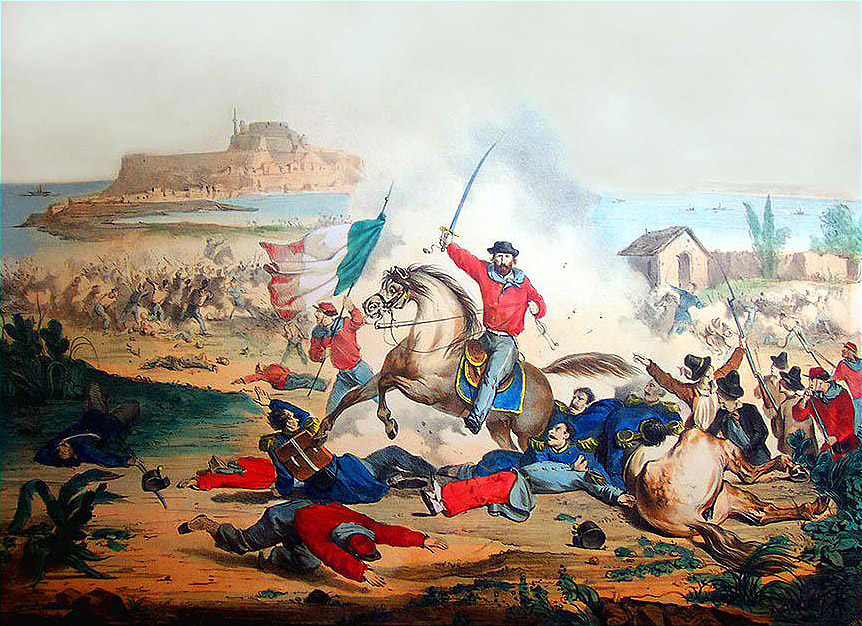
- Contemporary reconstruction of the battle
Date	17 July 1860 – 24 July 1860
Location	Milazzo, Sicily, Kingdom of the Two Sicilies 38°13′N 15°14′E
Result	Garibaldine victory

Belligerents
Redshirts (Garibaldine volunteers)	Kingdom of the Two Sicilies

Commanders and leaders
Giuseppe Garibaldi; Giacomo Medici; Enrico Cosenz	Ferdinando Beneventano del Bosco

Units involved
Garibaldine volunteers	Milazzo garrison (infantry and cavalry)

Strength
4,000	4,500

Casualties and losses
750 killed, wounded, prisoners, and missing	300 killed, wounded, prisoners, and missing

The Battle of Milazzo was fought between 17 and 24 July 1860 in the vicinity and in the city of Milazzo, when the Thousand led by Giuseppe Garibaldi, together with numerous volunteers who subsequently landed, mainly the Medici, formed the first nucleus of the Southern Army, that is, Garibaldi's army that landed in Sicily, invading the Kingdom of the Two Sicilies.

They defeated the Bourbon soldiers. The forces employed in the battle amounted to approximately 10,000 men, of whom over 6,000 were Garibaldi's men, while the Neapolitan soldiers who fought in the battle numbered 3,400; historians also report

== Deployments ==
The Battle of Milazzo was very different from that fought at Calatafimi. For the first time, Garibaldi's men faced a Bourbon formation led by a commander determined to fight.

The Bourbon forces, sent from Messina to defend the Milazzo fortress and its small garrison, consisted of three battalions of foot hunters, a squadron of mounted hunters, and a battery of mountain artillery, for a total of 3,400 men, led by the capable Colonel Ferdinando Beneventano del Bosco.

On this occasion, however, Garibaldi's forces were also stronger, supported by the 8,000 rifled-barrel carbines and the 400,000 cartridges arriving from Piedmont. The new rifles' range of up to 300 meters could not be exploited, however, because Garibaldi's men lacked the training necessary to fully utilize these weapons (see: Garibaldi's armament). Furthermore, Garibaldi's men could count on numerical superiority, despite lamenting the lack of cavalry units and an initial inferiority in artillery.

The historian George Macaulay Trevelyan estimates that on 20 July Garibaldi's men did not exceed the number of 5,700 and probably employed between 4,000 and 5,700. The same historian reports that, according to Bourbon sources, the forces of the Kingdom of the Two Sicilies amounted to a total of 122 officers and 4,544 soldiers, including the garrison of the Castle. Therefore, excluding the approximately 1,000 of the garrison, the Bosco would have had more than 3,000 men available to employ in the field.

Charles Stuart Forbes, a British journalist who accompanied the expedition, describes the opposing sides as follows, although Colonel Bosco only committed part of his force to the attack, with a second line of defense and the garrison of the castle as protection in case of retreat. Garibaldi also had two ships, each with 18 late-18th-century short-range guns, known as the Carronata model.

The forces present at the Battle of Milazzo
Garibaldi forces	number		Bourbon forces	number
Medical Division	2,400 + 50 artillerymen		3 Hunter Battalions	2,400
Consent Division	1,300		1st Battalion of the 15th Line Infantry Regiment (in the castle)	1,000
Malenchini Tuscan Brigade	700		Two Dragoon Squadrons	120
		Gunners	280	
Garibaldini total	4,400		Total Bourbons	3,800
Cannons	4		Cannons	24(almost everyone in the castle)
Cannons mod. Carronata on 2 ships	12 of 12 Lb and 6 of 6 Lb			

== Conduct ==
After a series of preliminary skirmishes, initiated by one another in the preceding days to test the strength of the opposing forces, the decisive battle broke out at 6:30 a.m. on 20 July, in the center of the plain that provides access to the small peninsula where the city of Milazzo stands. The writer Alessandro Dumas was also an eyewitness to the battle, describing some of Garibaldi's actions.

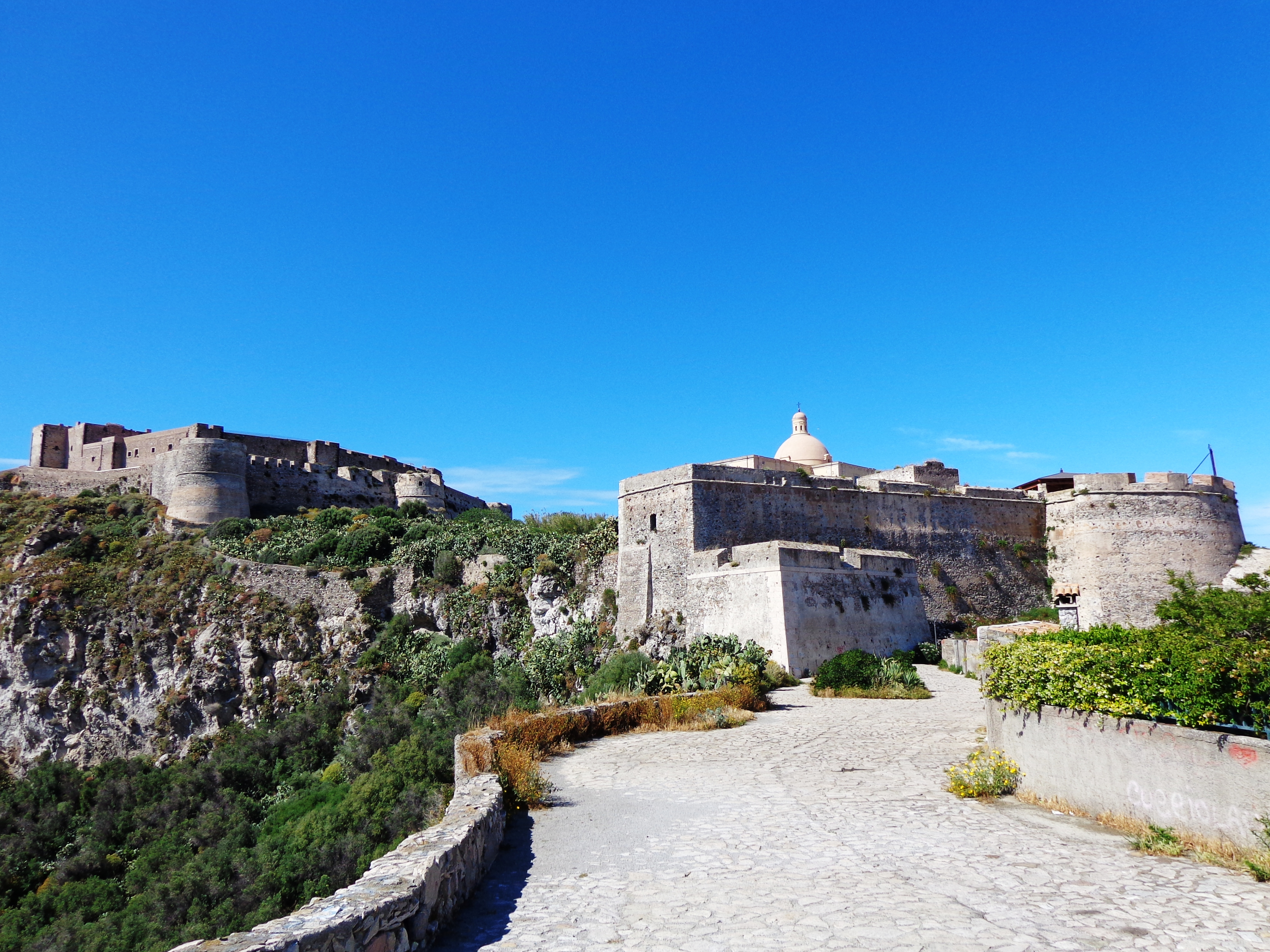
The fortified citadel

Garibaldi decided to attack the Bourbon line, arranged in two lines, with a massive central column, preceded by two simultaneous flank attacks, in order to create a useful diversion. The organization and synchronization of the movements was rather uncoordinated, and this first attempt turned into a real disaster, in which Garibaldi's men were repelled and barely managed to contain the Bourbon counterattack, suffering very heavy losses.

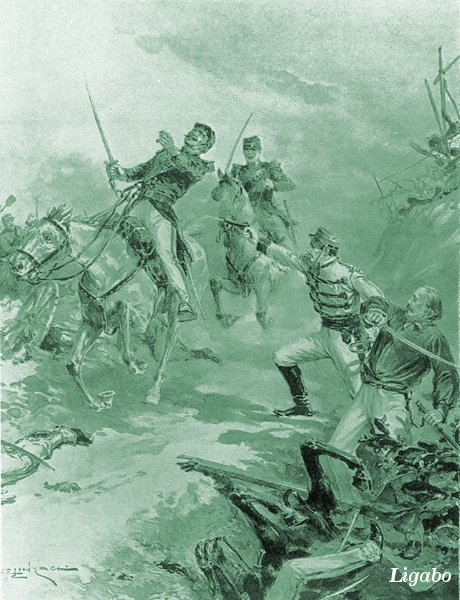
Garibaldi saved by Missori

But Garibaldi certainly wasn't lacking in men, and after a rapid reorganization of his cadres, Garibaldi's attacks continued for over six hours, during which the opposing sides demonstrated exceptional combativeness, galvanized by the two commanders-in-chief who personally led the actions, both continuously present on the front line.

The two were so close to the battle line that, on one famous occasion, a sudden attack by a detachment of Bourbon cavalry nearly overwhelmed Garibaldi himself, wounded by a bullet under his foot, which had torn off the sole and stirrup, forcing him to abandon his wounded horse and the revolver that remained in his saddlebag. Garibaldi's men present immediately took up defense of the commander to give him a chance to get to safety, but he threw himself into the fray and, unhorsed, was fortunately saved by the provident intervention of Giuseppe Missori. Captain Statella also took part in the clash. In the early afternoon, after unsuccessfully requesting reinforcements from the fortified citadel, where the Bourbon garrison of 1,400 men was barricaded under the command of Colonel Raffaele Pironti, who refused to take orders due to his greater seniority, Del Bosco decided to retreat towards the town, which offered greater protection for the defense.

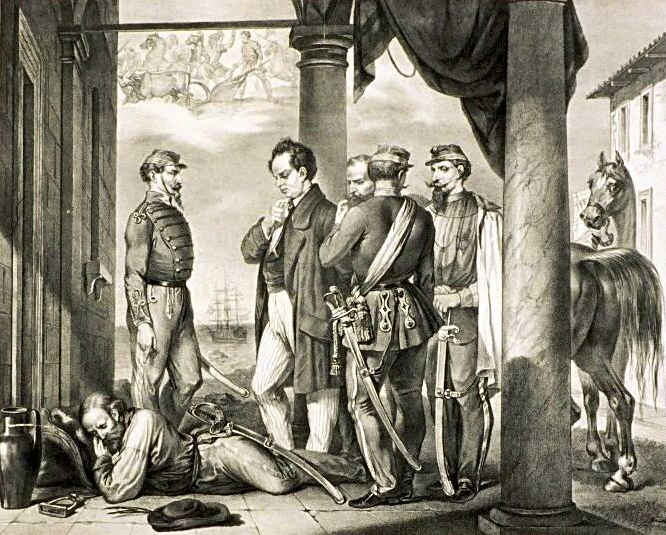
Garibaldi resting after the battle at the city of Milazzo

It was at that moment that the steam corvette Tukory reached the western coast. It was a modern vessel of the Bourbon navy, the "Veloce," which a few days earlier had been handed over to the Sardinian navy by Captain Amilcare Aguissola, contacted and persuaded to betray by Admiral Carlo Pellion di Persano (see: Hypotheses of corruption of the Bourbon officers). The behavior of the Bourbon officer in question would be followed by several other officers who would embrace the cause of unification: when Francis II aboard the "Messaggero" set sail from Naples for Gaeta, only three ships followed him, while almost the entire fleet remained anchored without answering the call.

The corvette, immediately handed over to Garibaldi's forces and renamed "Tukory," was armed with 10 powerful cannons which, personally directed by Garibaldi, began to relentlessly pound the left wing of the Bourbon forces, preventing any attempt at a counterattack and forcing them to retreat to the fortified citadel.

On 21 July, following the agreement desired by the Neapolitan Minister of War Giuseppe Salvatore Pianell, Marshal Tommaso de Clary and General Giacomo Medici signed the pact for the evacuation of Bourbon troops from Sicily and on 25 July, the units led by Colonels Pironti and del Bosco also embarked for Naples, leaving Milazzo in Garibaldi's hands.

== Losses ==
According to the most reliable historians, precise statistics are lacking. It can be assumed that Garibaldi's losses are estimated at 750 or 800 dead and wounded, while those of the Bourbons are estimated by Bosco at 116 dead and wounded, to which, according to Palmieri, should be added 31 missing and another dozen dead and wounded. Among Garibaldi's fallen and wounded are also 44 Genoese Carabinieri and that the "Gaeta Battalion" of the Corte expedition lost, again in dead and wounded, between 15 and 17 officers out of 32 and 190 volunteers out of 500 or 600. In any case, Garibaldi's contingent paid a very high price at Milazzo, largely superior to the enemy losses which, according to the testimony of Don Giuseppe Bottà, military chaplain of the Neapolitan Hunters, were limited to 51 dead, 80 wounded and 25 prisoners or missing, out of a total of 3400 men employed in battle.
; furthermore, the Bourbon forces, in addition to the 8 cannons of the mountain battery on the field, also had the support of the 40 cannons stationed on the walls of the Castle, which therefore caused many losses among Garibaldi's men, who had to attack well-protected opponents.
According to the article The Revolution in Sicily published in the British newspaper The Illustrated London News on 4 August 1860, no. 1043, page 96, Garibaldi's total losses were 780 and the Bourbon losses 1,223. The lower number of Bourbon losses was due to the fact that Colonel Bosco had deployed his troops in a favorable position, which allowed for a better defense, thus containing losses.

== See also ==
- Risorgimento
- Expedition of the Thousand

== Bibliography ==
- Giacomo Medici, La battaglia di Milazzo narrata dal generale Giacomo Medici al capitano Pasini Giovanni, Tipografia Sociale, Cremona, 1883
- G.B. Zaffaroni, Reminiscenze della battaglia di Milazzo fatti storici narrati da un combattente, Tip. già Boniotti diretta da F. Gareffi, Milano, 1862
- Santi Emanuele Barberini (1951). La battaglia di Milazzo del 20 luglio 1860 in rapporto all'unità d'Italia;. Alessandria: Tipografia Moderna. OCLC 34827541.
- George Macaulay Trevelyan, Garibaldi e la formazione dell'Italia, Longmans, 1911
- Giuseppe Cesare Abba, Da Quarto al Volturno, Nistri, Pisa, 1866
- Charles Stuart Forbes, The campaign of Garibaldi in the Two Sicilies, William Blackwood and Sons, Edimburgo, 1861
- Giuseppe Bandi, I Mille da Genova a Capua, Salani, Firenze, 1903
- Lorenzo Del Boca, Maledetti Savoia!, Edizioni Piemme, 2003
- Gigi Di Fiore, I vinti del Risorgimento, Utet, 2004
- Gigi Di Fiore, Controstoria dell'unità d'Italia - Fatti e misfatti del Risorgimento, Rizzoli 2007
