= Giacomo Medici (general) =

Italian nobleman, patriot and soldier (1817-1882)

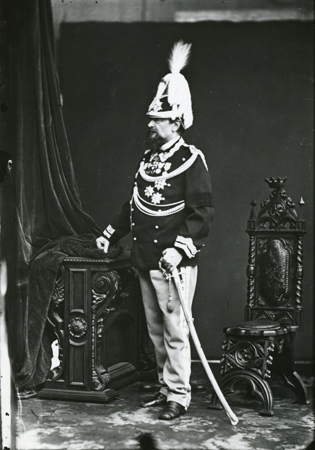
Giacomo Medici

Giacomo Medici, Marchese del Vascello (15 January 1817 – 9 March 1882) was an Italian nobleman, patriot and soldier.

== Biography ==
Medici was born in Milan in January 1817 as the eldest son of Giovanni Battista Angelo Medici and his wife Maria Beretta. His family traces its origin from Piedmont and there is no proof that it is related to the famous House of Medici. Exiled in 1836, he fought in Spain against the Carlists between 1836 and 1840. In London he met Giuseppe Mazzini, and later in Montevideo Giuseppe Garibaldi.

In 1849 he served with the army of the Roman Republic, fighting in defence of the Villa Vascello, near the Porta San Pancrazio in Rome, for which he was later awarded of the gold medal and the title of Marchese del Vascello.

During the Second War of Italian Independence in 1859, he joined Garibaldi's Hunters of the Alps, received the command of a battalion, and distinguished himself in the Battle of Varese. The following year, he participated in the expedition of "The Thousand" (I Mille), fighting in the Battle of Milazzo, at Messina, and in the Battle of the Volturno.

Joining the regular army, he was appointed military commandant of Palermo, in which capacity he facilitated the abortive campaign of Garibaldi in 1862.

During the Third War of Italian Independence in 1866, he was commander of the Trentino division. He became Grand Officer of the Military Order of Italy for his role in the war.

In the new Kingdom of Italy, Medici was several times deputy and senator. He was marquess of the Vascello and first aide-de-camp to king Victor Emmanuel II in 1876. He died in Rome on 9 March 1882.

== Commemoration ==
The Italian Regia Marina (Royal Navy) destroyer Giacomo Medici, later reclassified as a torpedo boat, was named for him.
