= Giuseppe Missori =

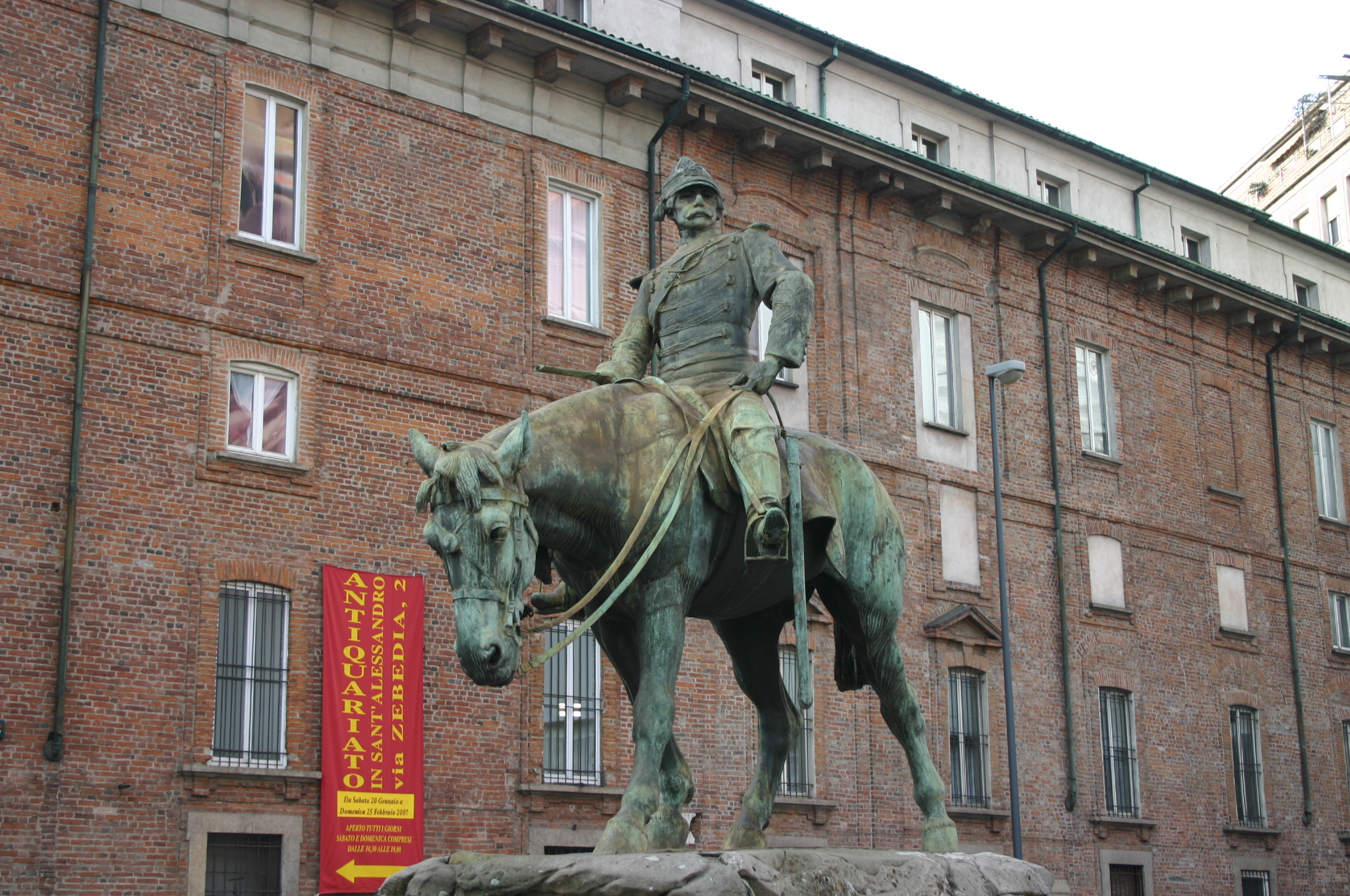
Monument to Missori by sculptor Riccardo Ripamonti (1916), Piazza Missori, Milan

Giuseppe Missori (11 June 1829 - 25 March 1911) was an Italian patriot, military leader during the Italian unification, and politician. He served under Garibaldi during the Second Italian War of Independence, the Expedition of the Thousand, and the Third Italian War of Independence. After the unification of Italy, he was twice a member of the City Council of Milan.

== Biography ==
Missori was born in Moscow in 1829, to a family of Bolognese origin, but soon moved to Milan, where he first proved his patriotic enthusiasm in the Five Days of Milan. An admirer of both Giuseppe Mazzini and Giuseppe Garibaldi, at the beginning of the Second Italian War of Independence he enrolled in the Hunters of the Alps corps, being assigned to the "Guide a Cavallo" ("mounted scouts") regiment. In 1859 he fought in some of the main battles on the Lombard front. In 1860 he was in the Expedition of the Thousand, and saved Garibaldi's life in the Battle of Milazzo (1860). In 1862, in behalf of Garibaldi, he created the army of volunteers from Reggio Calabria, Catanzaro, and Cosenza that eventually fought the Bersaglieri in the Battle of Aspromonte that same year. Between 1866 and 1867 he was again with Garidaldi in the Third Italian War of Independence, participating in several battles, including Bezzecca, Monterotondo, and Mentana.

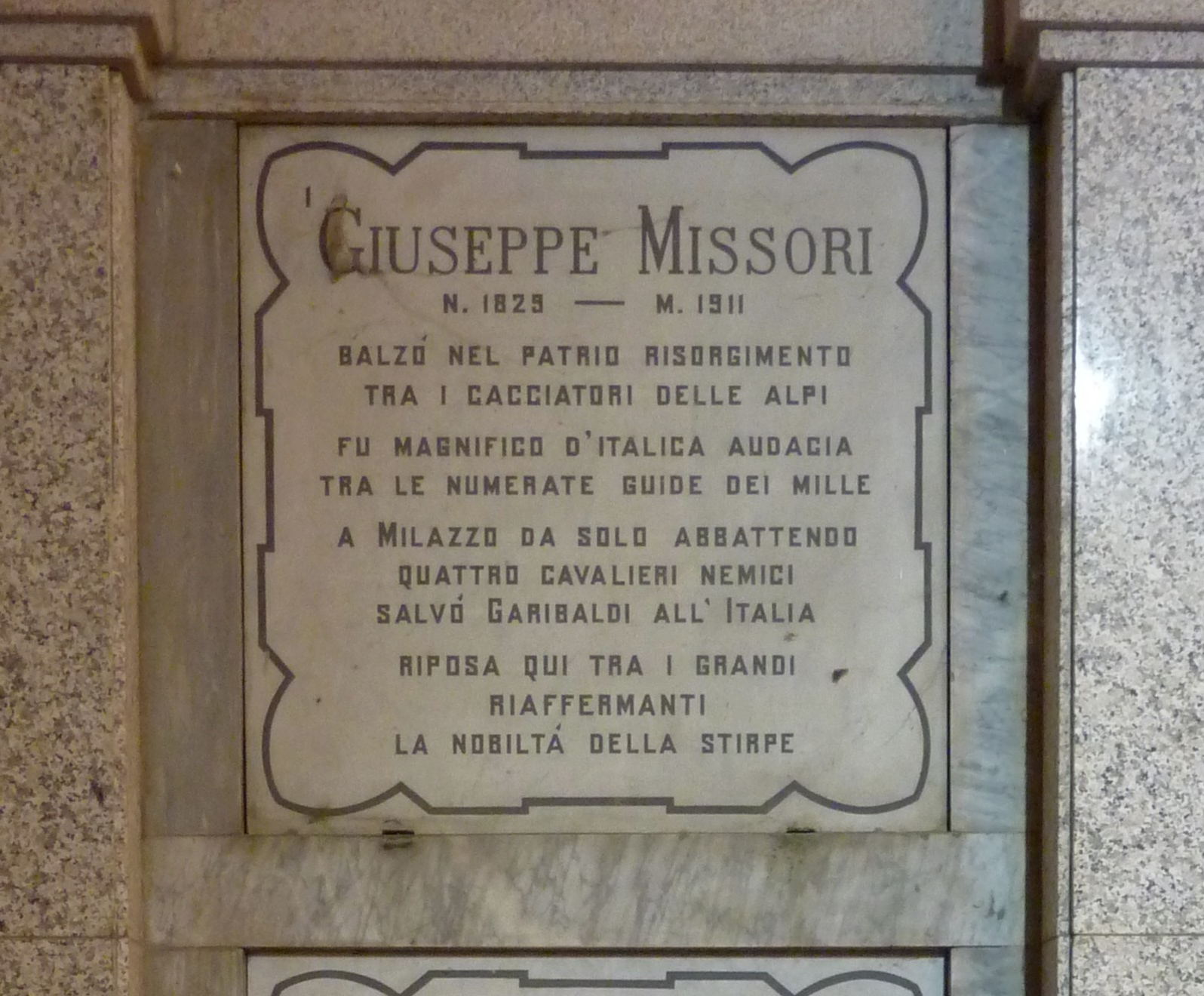
Missori's grave at the Monumental Cemetery of Milan

After the unification of Italy, he declined repeated offers to enter politics (e.g., as a deputee) in the name of his republican ideals (he wouldn't swear loyalty to the Savoy Monarchy). Nevertheless, he eventually accepted to become a member of the City Council of Milan in 1889-1894 and again in 1899–1902. He died of sickness in Milan on 25 March 1911. His funerals were largely attended by the population, political representatives, and a delegation of Martinitt, the boys from the eponymous Milanese orphanage (which Missori had directed for a while). According to his last will, his body was cremated. On 11 June 1929, his remains were placed in the "Famedio", the main building of the Monumental Cemetery of Milan, reserved for the most eminent Milanese people.

== Equestrian monument to Giuseppe Missori, Milan ==
A number of cities in Italy have streets or squares named after Missori; Milan has a central square Piazza Giuseppe Missori (about 500 m south of Piazza del Duomo). A bronze equestrian statue of Missori, by sculptor Riccardo Ripamonti, is located in the centre of this square, and was built using bronze from old cannons. The statue, inaugurated in 1916, features an unusually weary-looking horse, which the Milanese reportedly nicknamed "caval de brüm" (roughly meaning "carriage horse") because of its less than martial appearance; a saying "te pàret el cavall del Missori" ("you look like Missori's horse") is also sometimes used in Milan to address someone who looks sad. A horse in the same posture putatively was featured in a prior work by Ripamonti, entitled Waterloo, thus depicting Napoleon, on the occasion of his famous defeat. However, the posture as well as the low rough perch or plinth fit well with lack of imperiousness and regal obsequiousness shown by Missori in his later life. The inscription on the pedestal of the statue, now almost illegible, commemorates Missori saving Garibaldi's life in Milazzo:

Italian
Il colonnello Giuseppe Missori, con la solita sua bravura, mi sbarazzò col suo revolver dal mio antagonista di cavalleria nemica.

Giuseppe Garibaldi

English
Colonel Giuseppe Missori, clever as usual, with his revolver got rid of my antagonist from the enemy cavalry.
