= Milazzo =

Town in Sicily, Italy

Milazzo Milazzu (Sicilian) Mýlai (Greek)
- Comune
- Comune di Milazzo
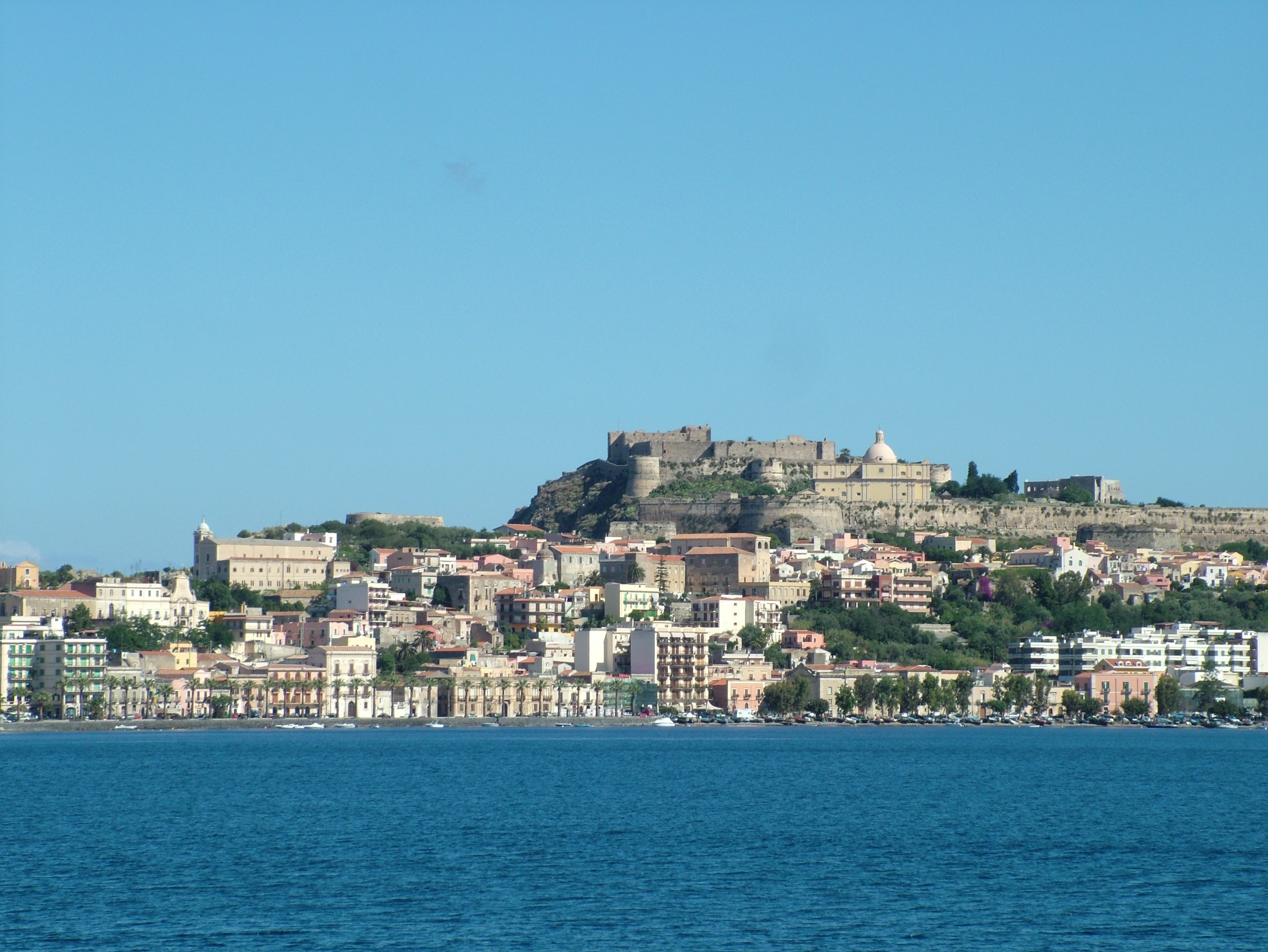
- Panoramic view from the sea

- Coat of arms
- Nickname: The cape town
- Milazzo within the Province of Messina

- Location within Italy Location within Sicily
- Coordinates: 38°13′15″N 15°14′29″E
- Country: Italy
- Region: Sicily
- Metropolitan city: Messina (ME)

Government
  - Mayor: Giuseppe Midili

Area
  - Total: 24.23 km^{2} (9.36 sq mi)
- Elevation: 1 m (3.3 ft)

Population (30 April 2025)
  - Total: 29,842
  - Density: 1,232/km^{2} (3,190/sq mi)
- Demonyms: Milazzesi, Mamertini or Milaiti
- Time zone: UTC+1 (CET)
  - Summer (DST): UTC+2 (CEST)
- Postal code: 98057
- Dialing code: 090
- Patron saint: St. Stephen
- Saint day: First Sunday of September
- Website: Official website

Milazzo (Sicilian: Milazzu; Latin: Mylae; Ancient Greek: Μύλαι, romanized: Mýlai) is a municipality (comune) in the Metropolitan City of Messina, Sicily, southern Italy. It is the largest municipality in the Metropolitan City after Messina and Barcellona Pozzo di Gotto. The town has a population of around 31,500 inhabitants.

Founded by the ancient Greeks around 716 BC and part of Magna Graecia and recognised as a Roman civitas since 36 BC, the city was also at the centre of history during the First Punic War (260 BC), and in July 1860 with the arrival of the red shirts in the battle of Milazzo during the Expedition of the Thousand, an event of the unification of Italy.

== History ==
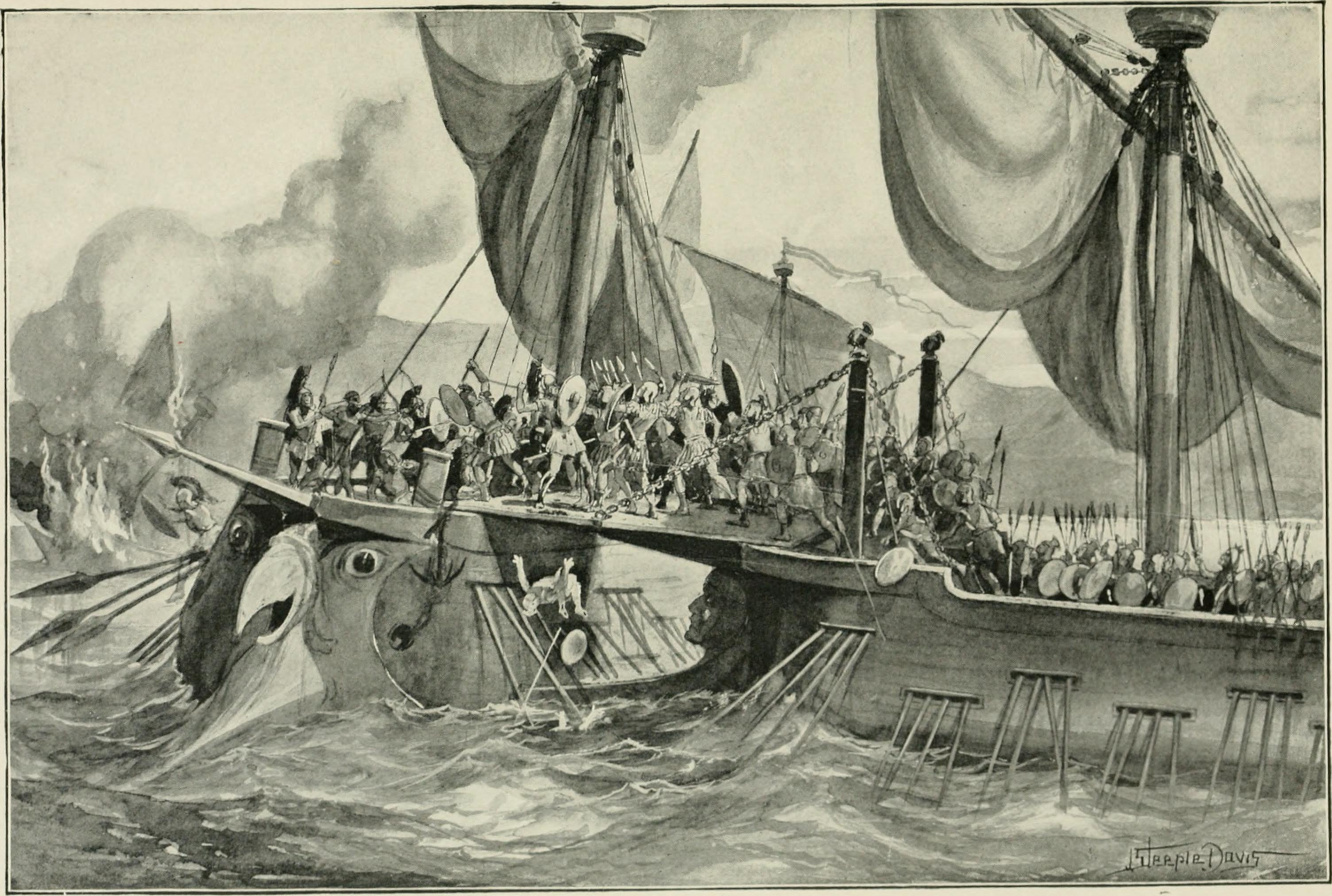
Battle of Mylae (260 BC)

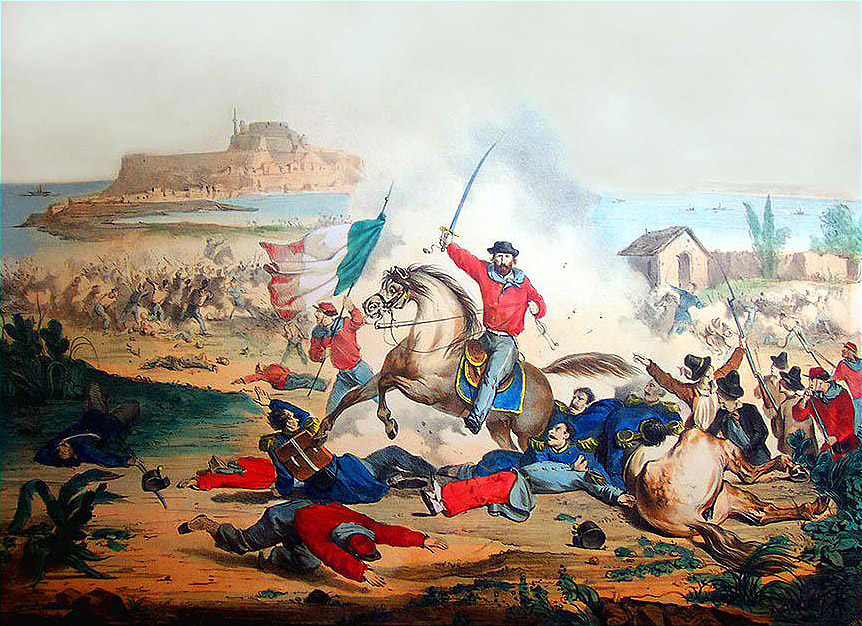
Battle of Milazzo (1860)

Several civilizations settled in Milazzo and left signs of their presence from the Neolithic age. In Homer's Odyssey Milazzo is presumably the place where Ulysses is shipwrecked and meets Polyphemus.

Historically, the town originated as the ancient Greek Mylae (Ancient Greek: Μύλαι) in Magna Graecia, an outpost of Zancle, occupied before 648 BC, perhaps as early as 716 BC. It was taken by the Athenians in 426 BC. The people of Rhegium planted the exiles from Naxos and Catana in 395 BC as a counterpoise to Dionysius the Elder's foundation of Tyndaris; but Dionysius soon took it. In the bay Gaius Duilius won the first Roman naval victory over the Carthaginians (260 BC).

In 36 BC the naval Battle of Mylae was fought offshore. The fleet of Octavian, commanded by Marcus Agrippa, engaged that of Sextus Pompey. While the battle was nearly a draw, Sextus could not replace his losses, and was thus weaker at the following Battle of Naulochus (36 BC), where he was utterly defeated. It was recognised as a Roman civitas in the same year.

After the fall of the Western Roman Empire, under the Byzantines, the town became one of the first episcopal seats of Sicily. In the 9th century Milazzo was conquered by the Arabs, who built the first nucleus of the castle there. Frederick II of Hohenstaufen further fortified the town and created a personal hunting park. The castle was later mostly rebuilt in the age of Charles V of Spain.

Milazzo was also the seat of a battle in 1718 between Spain and Austria, and of another fought by Giuseppe Garibaldi against the Kingdom of Two Sicilies during his Expedition of the Thousand (1860), an event of the unification of Italy. The expedition was successful and concluded with a plebiscite that brought Naples and Sicily into the Kingdom of Piedmont-Sardinia, the last territorial conquest before the proclamation of the Kingdom of Italy on 17 March 1861.

== Geography ==
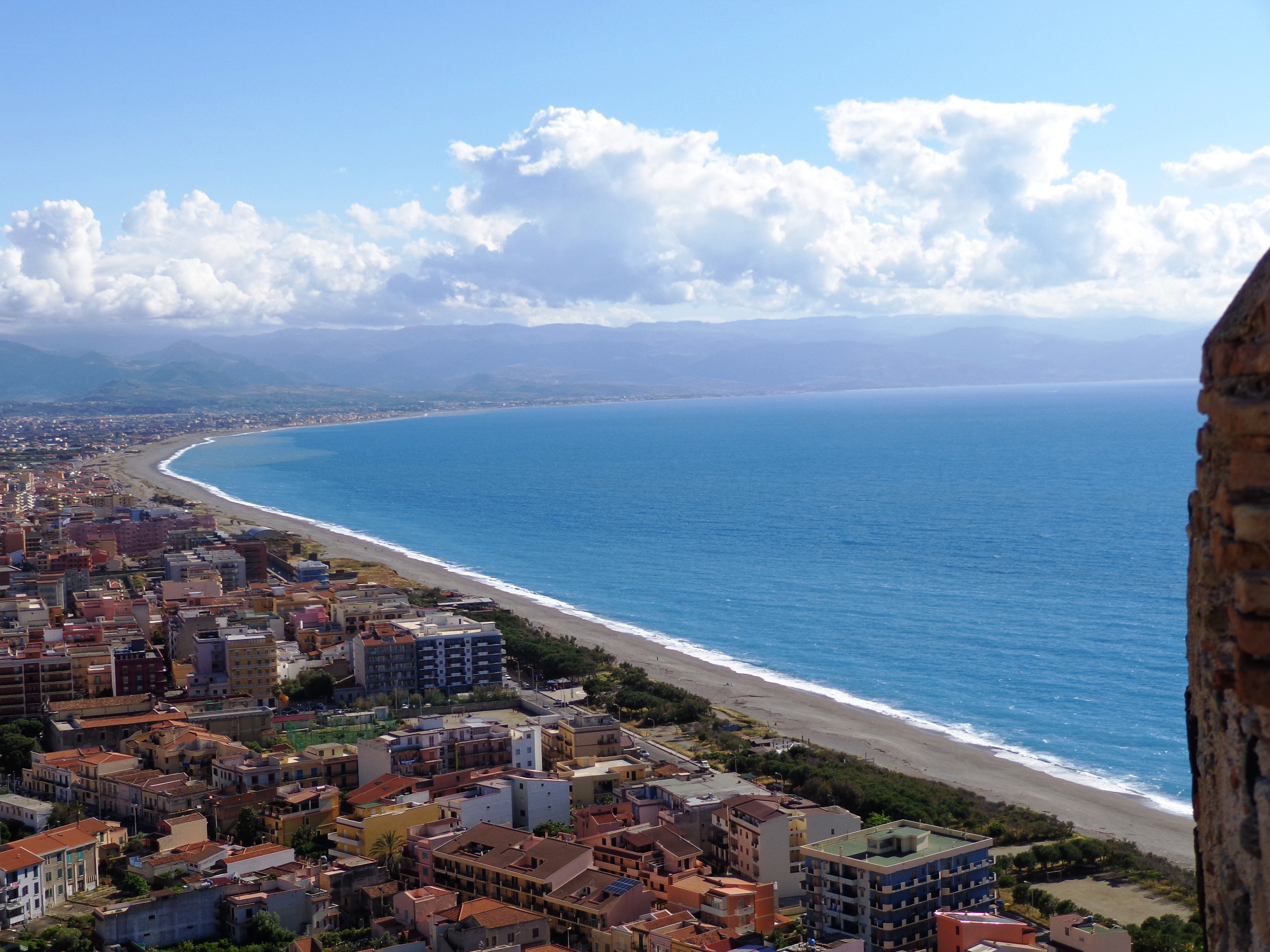
View of Milazzo

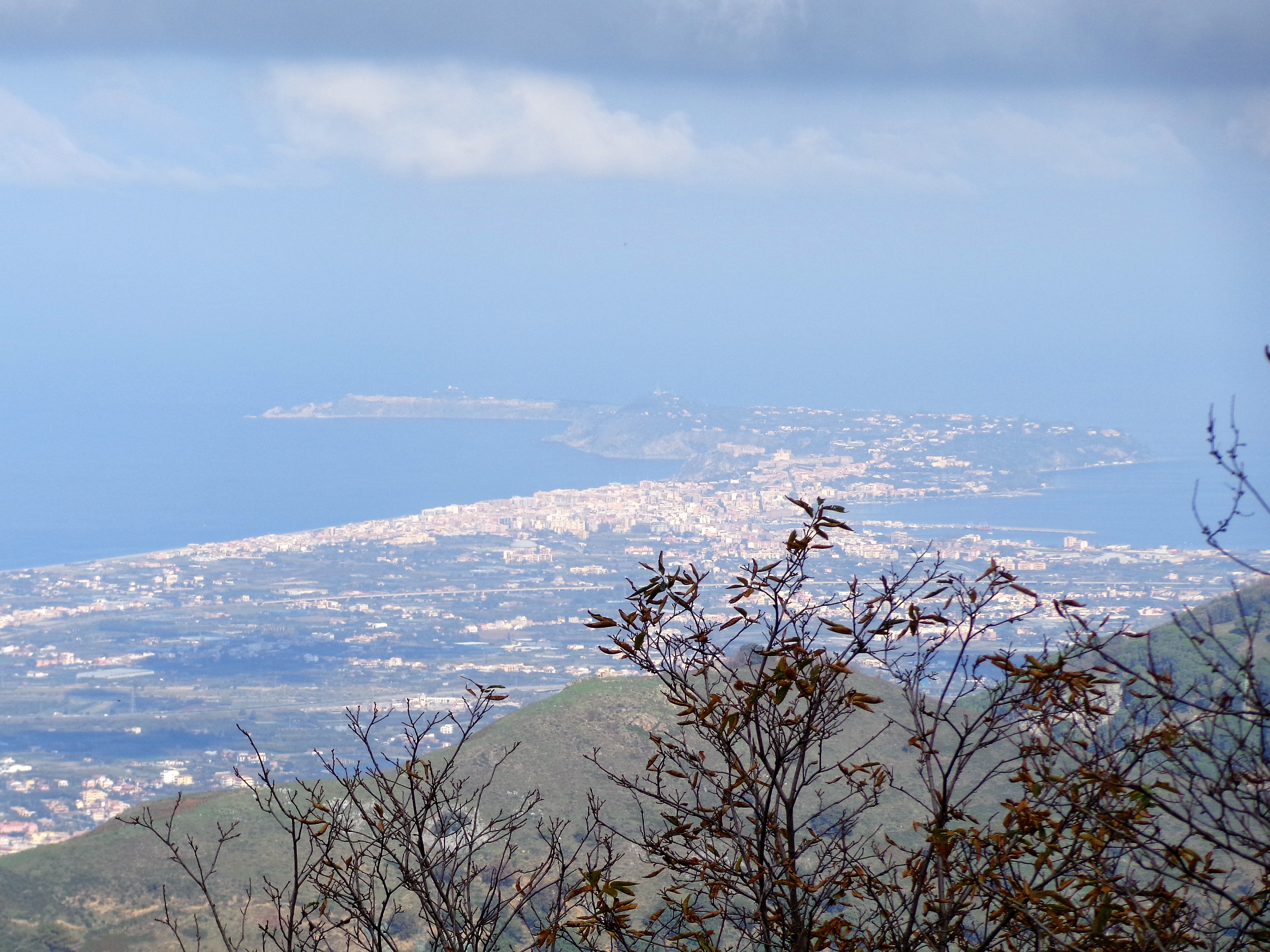
View of the peninsula and the Milazzo plain from the King's hill.

Milazzo borders with the municipalities of Barcellona Pozzo di Gotto, Merì and San Filippo del Mela.

Milazzo is the point of reference of a vast territory, from Villafranca Tirrena to Patti (over 200,000 inhabitants). It is also an important centre of the Strait of Messina Metropolitan Area (which also includes areas of Reggio Calabria), with the nearby town Barcellona Pozzo di Gotto. Located at the base of a peninsula that juts into the Tyrrhenian Sea with a small promontory, the town is 43 kilometres (27 mi) from the city of Messina.

The origins of the promontory can be traced back to 1.5 million years ago, when between the Tertiary and Quaternary tectonic movements led to a rise of sedimentary and crystalline rocks between 20 and 70 meters above sea level. Sand and marine sediments were deposited on them, during an interglacial period (430,000 years ago) which represents the Tyrrhenian plain. An island was then formed not far from the mainland. Subsequently, large quantities of debris and alluvial deposits from the Peloritani mountains joined it to Sicily.

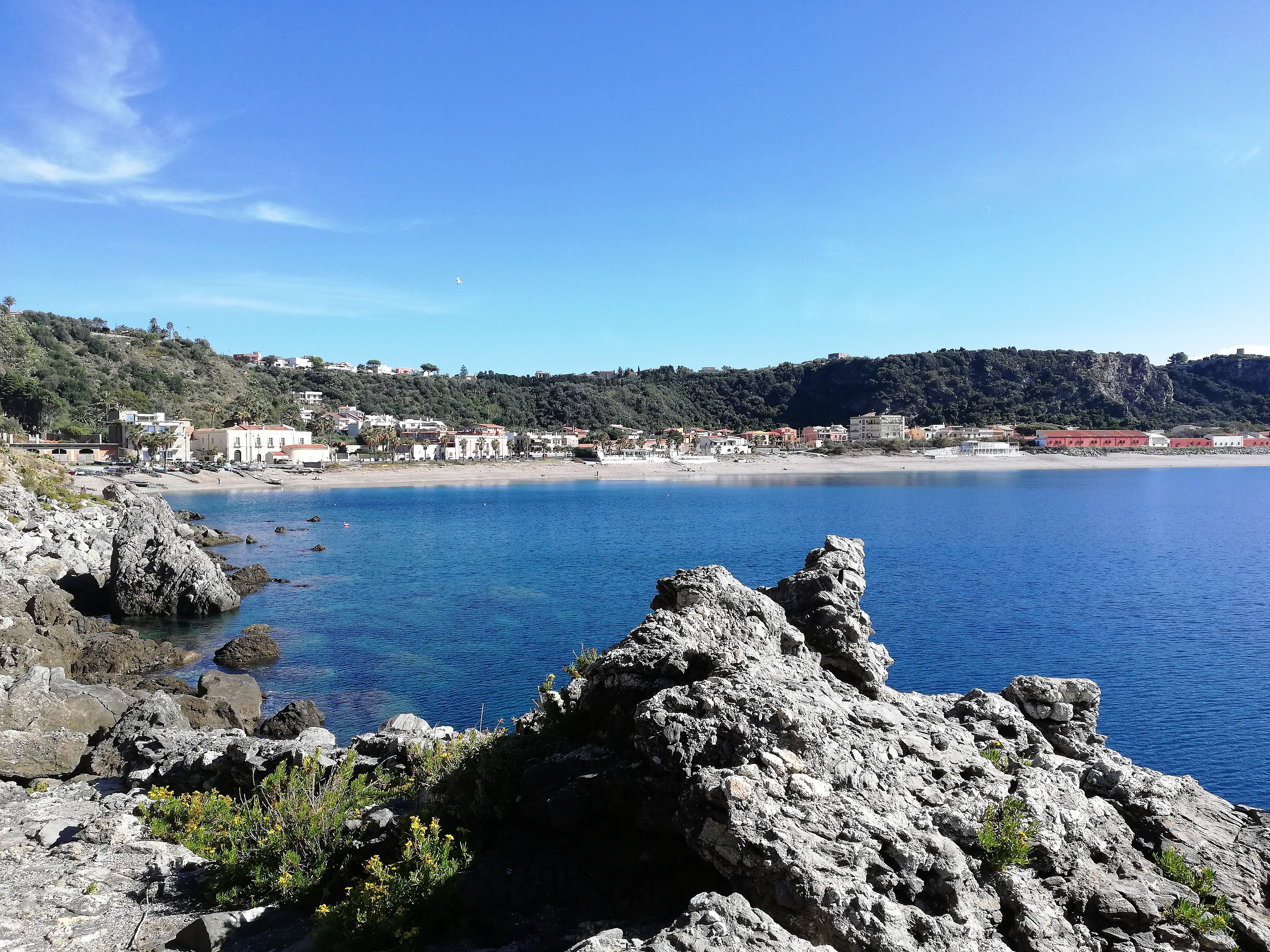
Riviera di Ponente

The city stands at the beginning of a peninsula about 8 km long (Capo Milazzo) in the Tyrrhenian Sea, in a northerly direction. To the west of the Milazzo territory is the Riviera di Ponente, overlooking the Gulf of Patti (Mar di Ponente); to the east, the Gulf of Milazzo (Mar di Levante). The territory of the municipality, on the southern side, is characterized by a large alluvial plain (Piana di Milazzo). The municipal border on the mainland is demarcated to the east by the Floripotema river, which divides the municipality of Milazzo from that of San Filippo del Mela, and to the west by the Mela river (or Merì), which separates the municipality of Milazzo from Barcellona Pozzo di Gotto and Merì.

== Climate ==
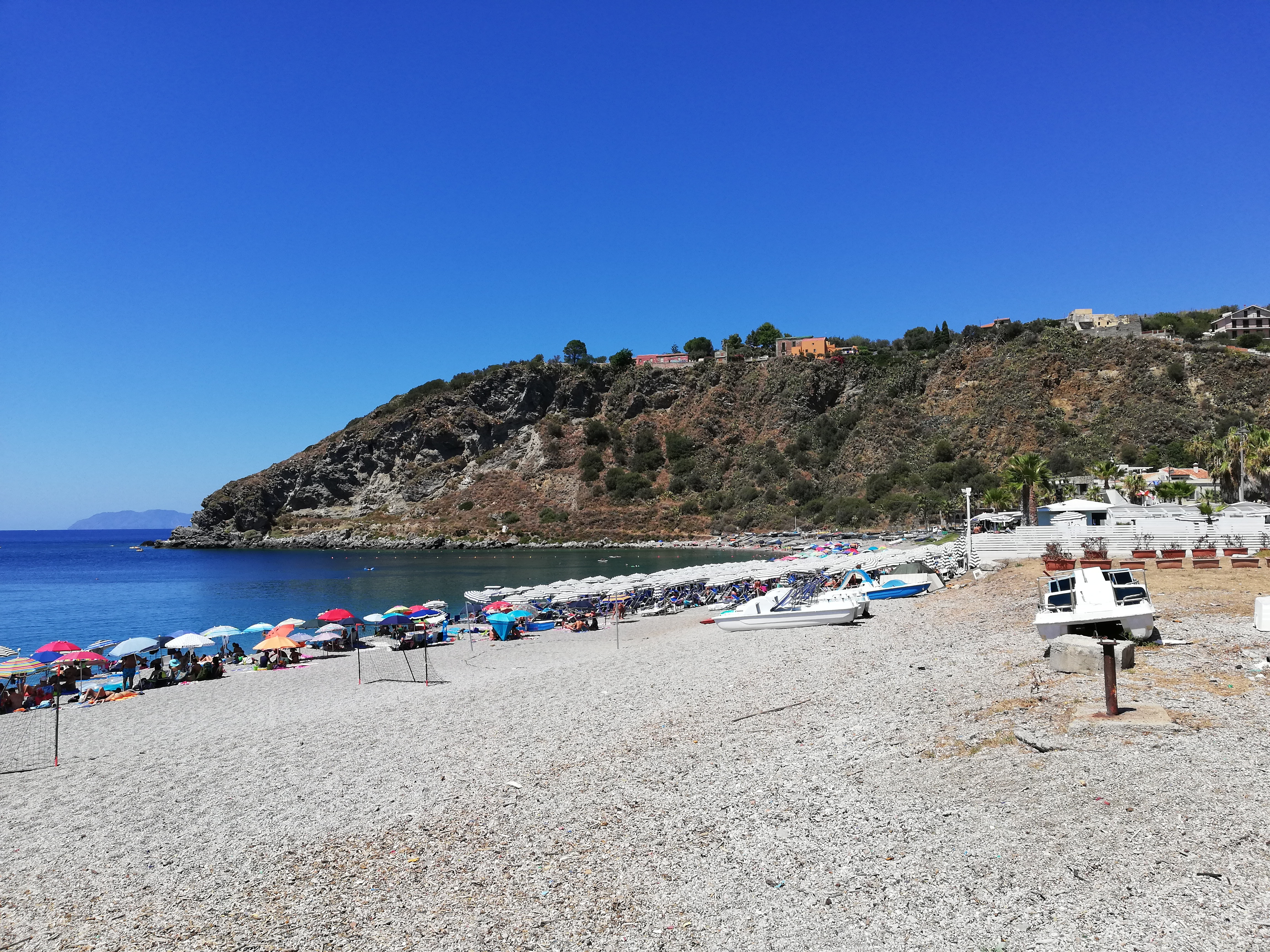
Baia del Tono

Milazzo has a Mediterranean climate with evident subtropical characteristics, characterized by very limited temperature variations throughout the year. According to the Köppen climate classification, the city is part of the Csa climate zone.

The annual rainfall in the area is approximately 850–900 mm. The months with the highest precipitation are January, February, November and December. In recent decades, there has been a gradual climate change, manifested by the increase in stormy phenomena, sometimes extreme, which have therefore highlighted a slow tropicalization of the area.

In the area in question, the predominant and constant winds, both weak and medium and strong, are the Ponente (coming from the West) and, with less frequency, the Sirocco (coming from the South-East). This situation occurs in all months of the year except for the summer months, during which the frequency of strong winds decreases. Strong and very strong winds (7th-12th on the Beaufort scale) are concentrated in the autumn and winter periods even if they occur with lower frequencies than the weaker ones. As for the West, the Milazzo peninsula offers, on the port side, a good shelter, while for the Sirocco the bay (Mar di Levante) is uncovered. The opposite occurs for the opposite coast.

Climate data for Milazzo
Month	Jan	Feb	Mar	Apr	May	Jun	Jul	Aug	Sep	Oct	Nov	Dec	Year
Mean daily maximum °C (°F)	14.5 (58.1)	15.1 (59.2)	16.7 (62.1)	19.4 (66.9)	23.4 (74.1)	27.3 (81.1)	30.3 (86.5)	29.9 (85.8)	27.3 (81.1)	24.4 (75.9)	20.4 (68.7)	16.2 (61.2)	22.1 (71.7)
Mean daily minimum °C (°F)	8.4 (47.1)	8.3 (46.9)	9.5 (49.1)	11.7 (53.1)	15.3 (59.5)	18.7 (65.7)	22.0 (71.6)	22.2 (72.0)	19.4 (66.9)	16.8 (62.2)	13.2 (55.8)	9.9 (49.8)	14.6 (58.3)
Average rainfall mm (inches)	115.0 (4.53)	105.0 (4.13)	88.0 (3.46)	71.0 (2.80)	37.0 (1.46)	24.0 (0.94)	13.0 (0.51)	21.0 (0.83)	85.0 (3.35)	110.0 (4.33)	109.0 (4.29)	129.0 (5.08)	907 (35.71)
Average rainy days	11	10	9	8	5	3	2	3	8	8	10	12	89
Average relative humidity (%)	83	80	77	75	70	65	62	64	75	81	83	83	75
Mean daily sunshine hours	6.3	7.1	8.6	10.1	11.4	12.3	12.2	11.4	9.7	8.4	7.3	6.3	9.3
Average ultraviolet index	5	6	6	7	7	7	8	7	6	5	4	4	6
Source: Recordpiana, Milazzo Climate-Data, Milazzo Meteo-Mondo, Milazzo

== Natural areas ==
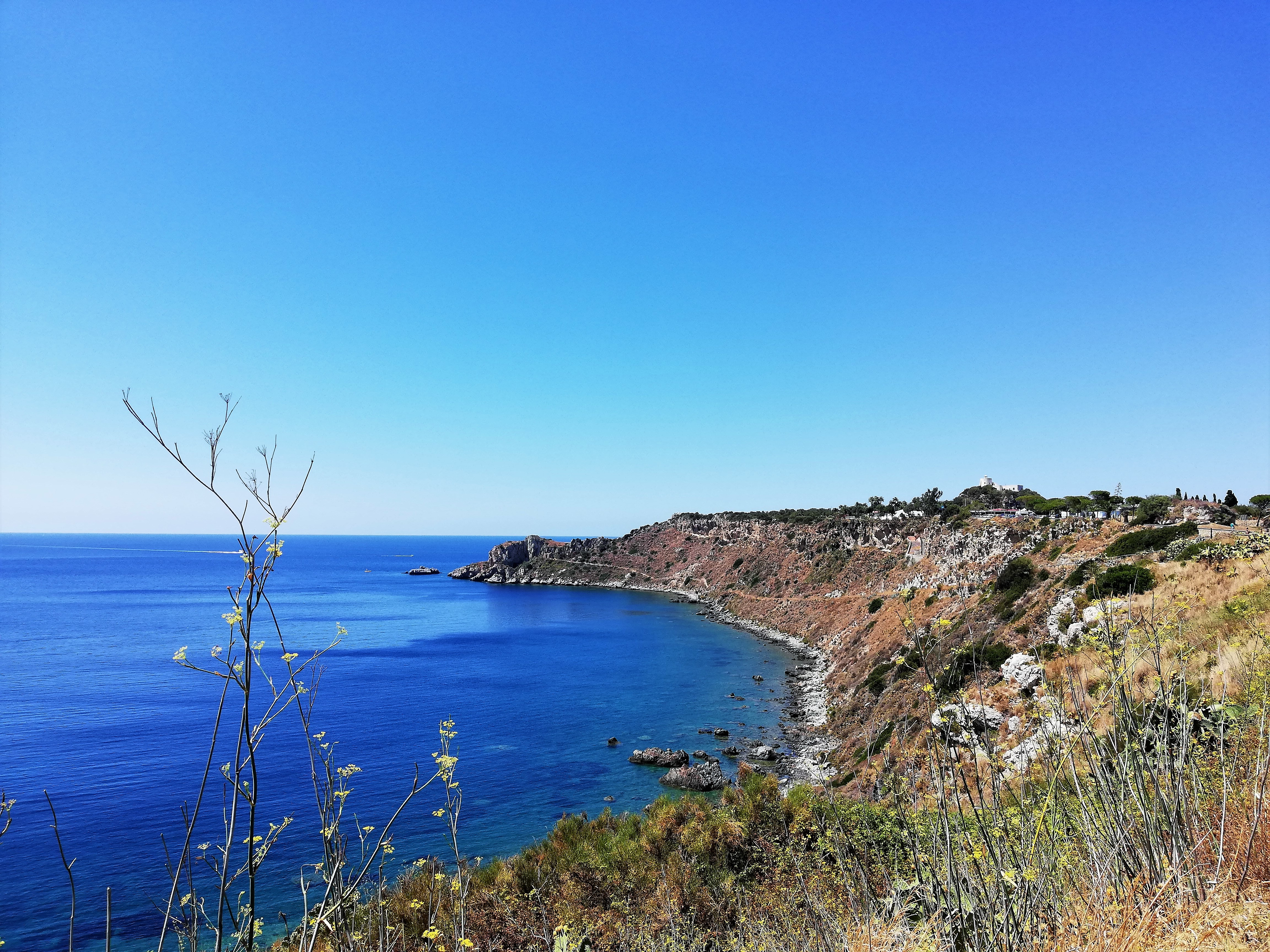
Capo Milazzo

The area of Capo Milazzo is a marine protected area whose most famous attraction is the Piscina di Venere, a natural body of water on the extreme tip of the cape. Capo Milazzo is the cape with which the Gulf of Milazzo ends to the west and the Gulf of Patti begins.

At the end of the cape, a marine reserve of the promontory was established in 2019, called the Capo Milazzo marine protected area. Inside the promontory stands an imposing fortified citadel built starting from the Norman age and expanded several times over the centuries.

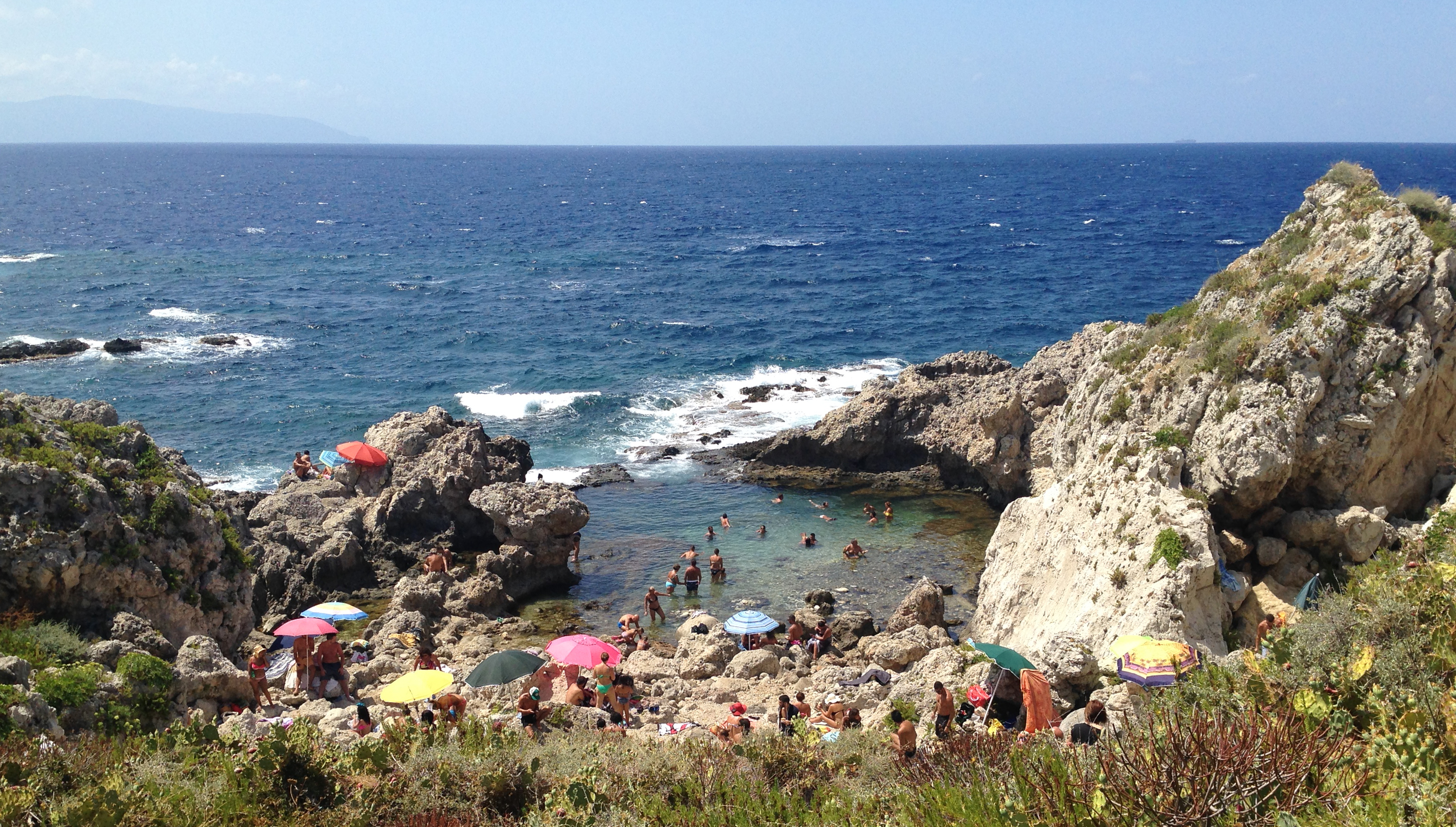
The Piscina di Venere

Located in the final part of the promontory, is the Sanctuary of Sant'Antonio da Padova, a real rock refuge, where the saint found shelter after being shipwrecked on that coast in January 1221 and then transformed into a place of worship. Nearby stands a military lighthouse, built in the 16th century and activated by the Civil Engineering Department in 1853 and made operational again since 2013.

== Main sights ==
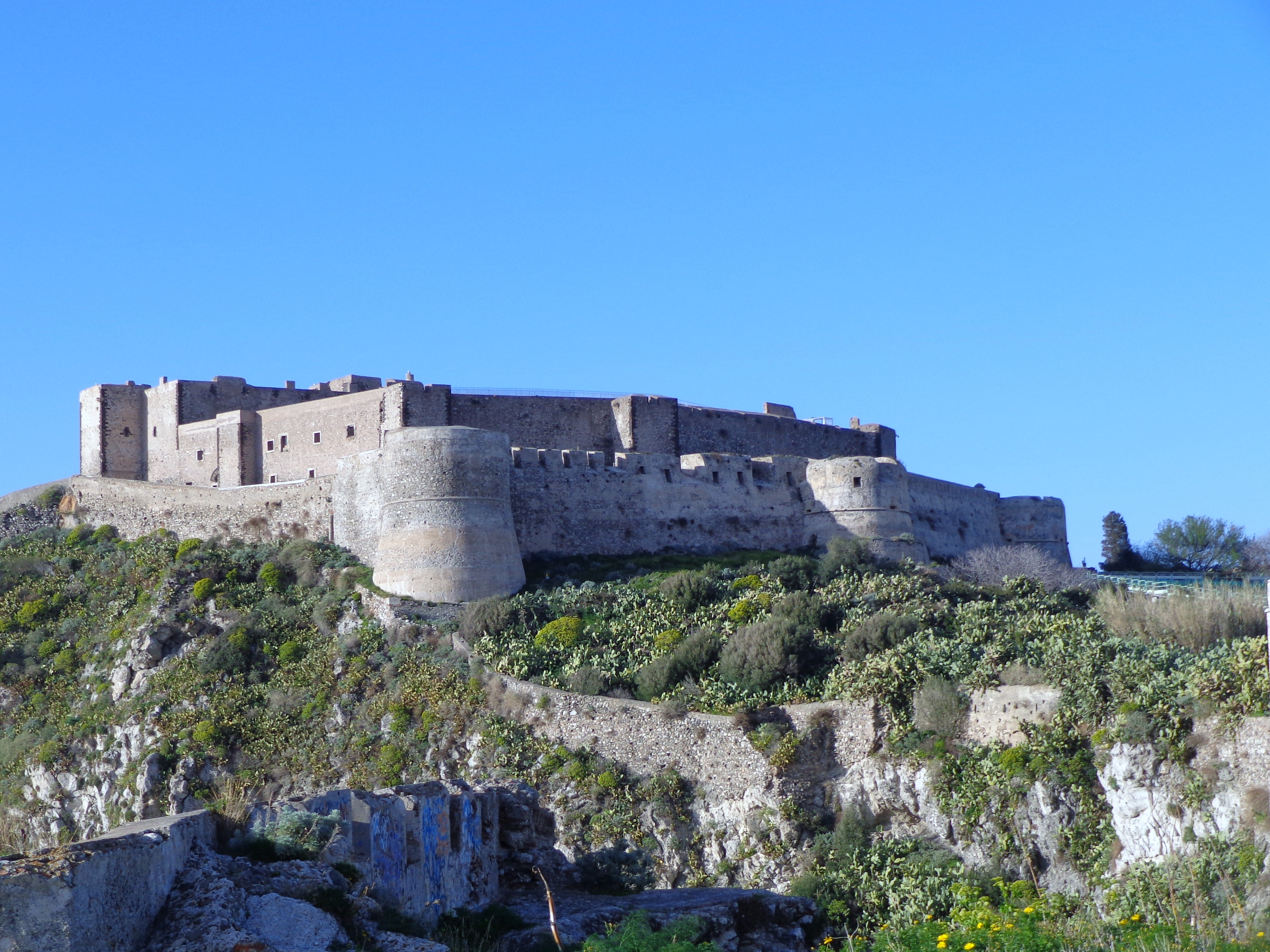
Castle of Milazzo

- Castle of Milazzo was begun by the Arabs, enlarged by the Normans, restored and strengthened by Frederick II, it is surrounded by walls with round towers built under Alfonso V of Aragon, with a Gothic portal dating from the 14th century. Near the castle are the ruins of the fourteenth-century palace of the grand jury and the old cathedral (1603) probably built on a design by architect Camillo Camillians.

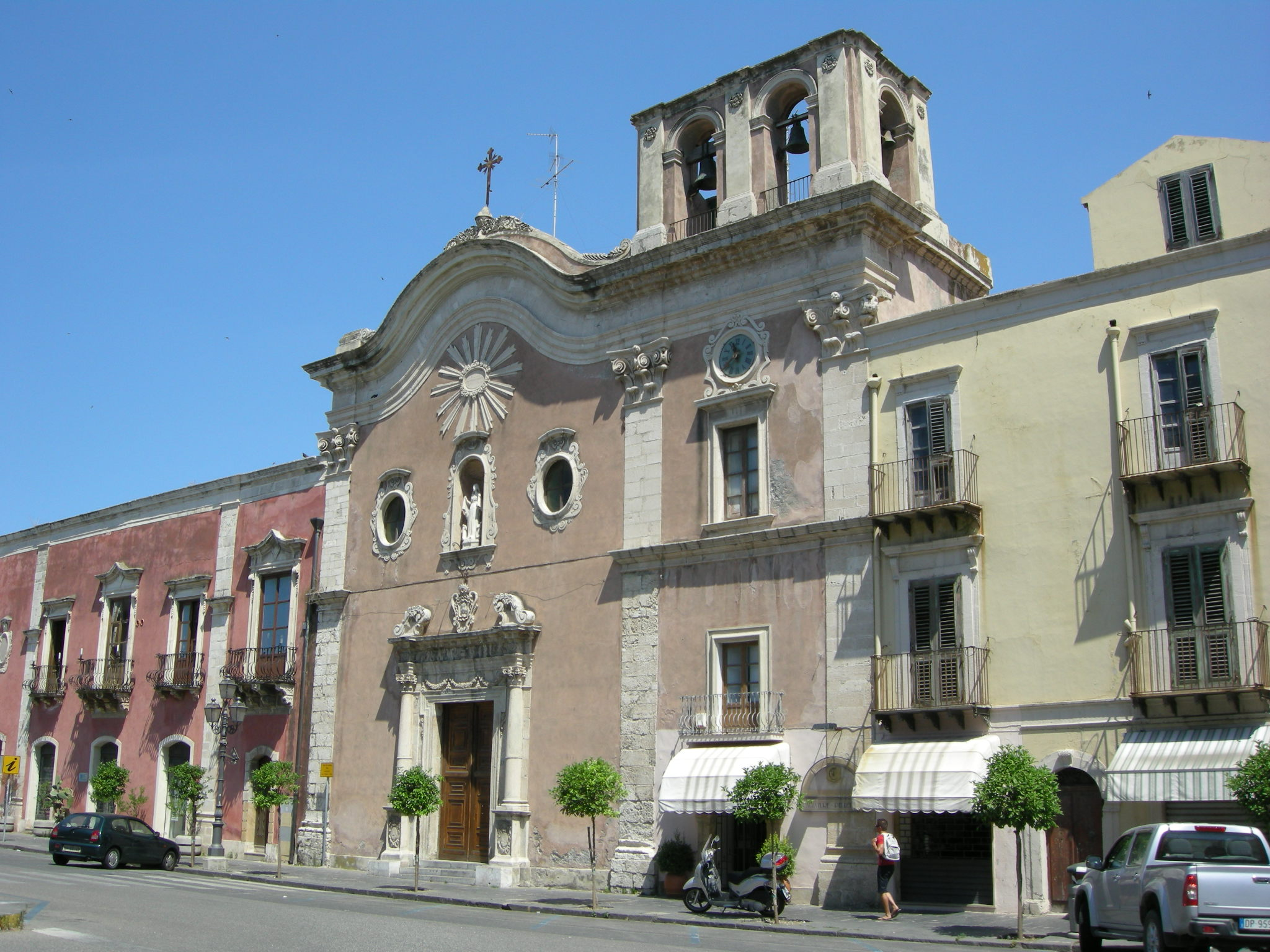
The church of the Carmine.

- the Church of Our Lady of Mount Carmel is located inside the fortified city, and its construction began in 1608 based on designs by Camillo Camilliani, a student of Michelangelo. The cathedral was built to replace the old mother church of Santa Maria, demolished in 1568 for strategic-military reasons. The embellishment and completion works of the new work continued until around 1700.
- the Baroque Church of the Holy Crucifix (1629), housing a wooden canopy from the 18th century and a wooden crucifix from the early 17th century.
- Rock church of St. Anthony of Padua (1232).
- Sanctuary of St. Francis of Paola (1464-1467).

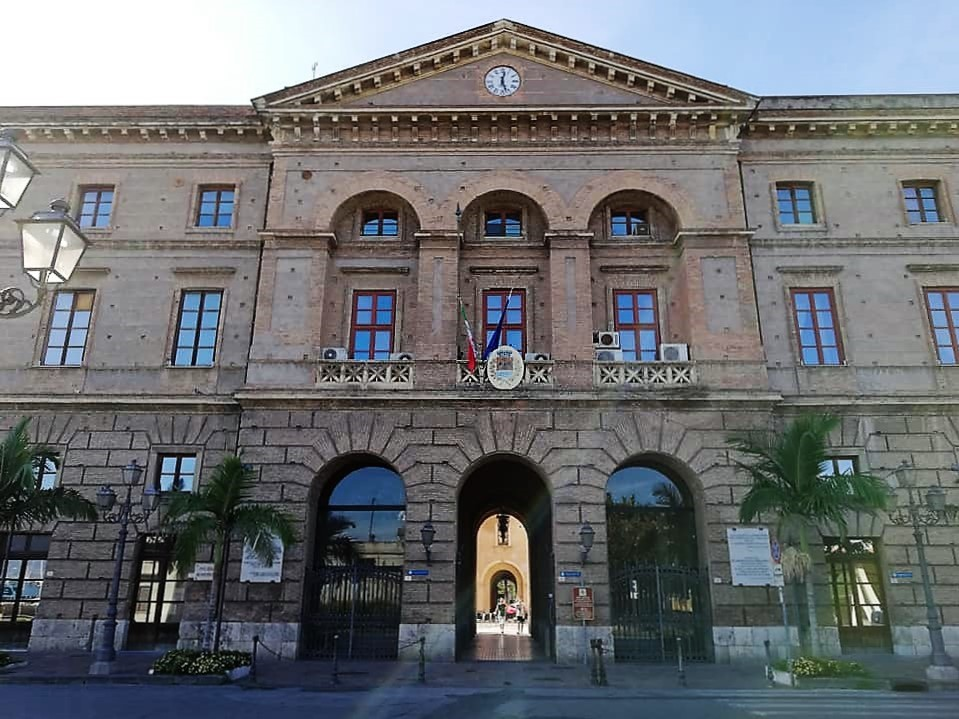
The town hall of Milazzo .

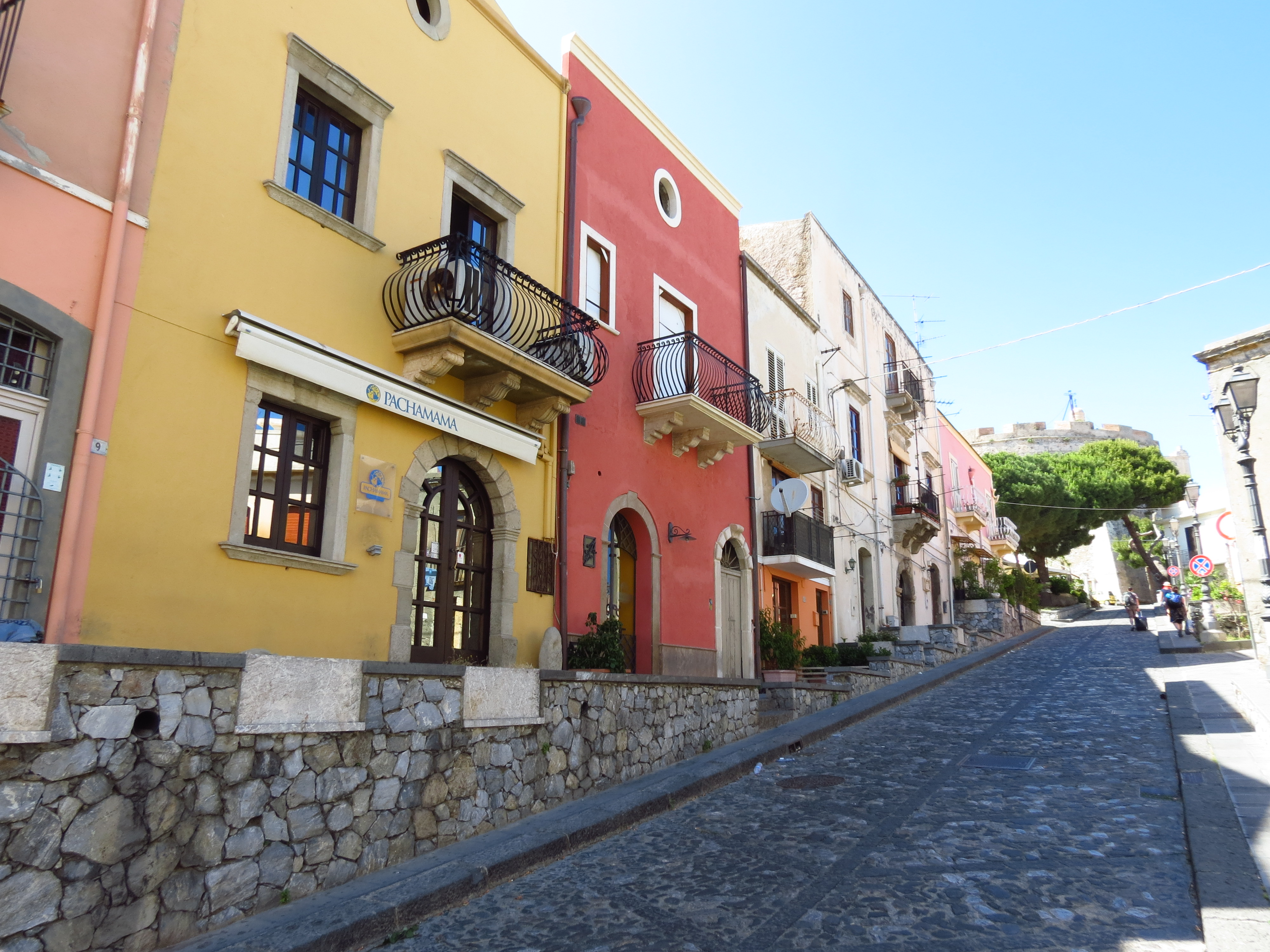
Ancient Cathedral Street

- The town hall.
- D'Amico Palace.
- Villa Lucifero.
- Villa Paradiso.
- Villa Gamberini.
- Milazzo theatre.

== Historic or important squares and streets ==
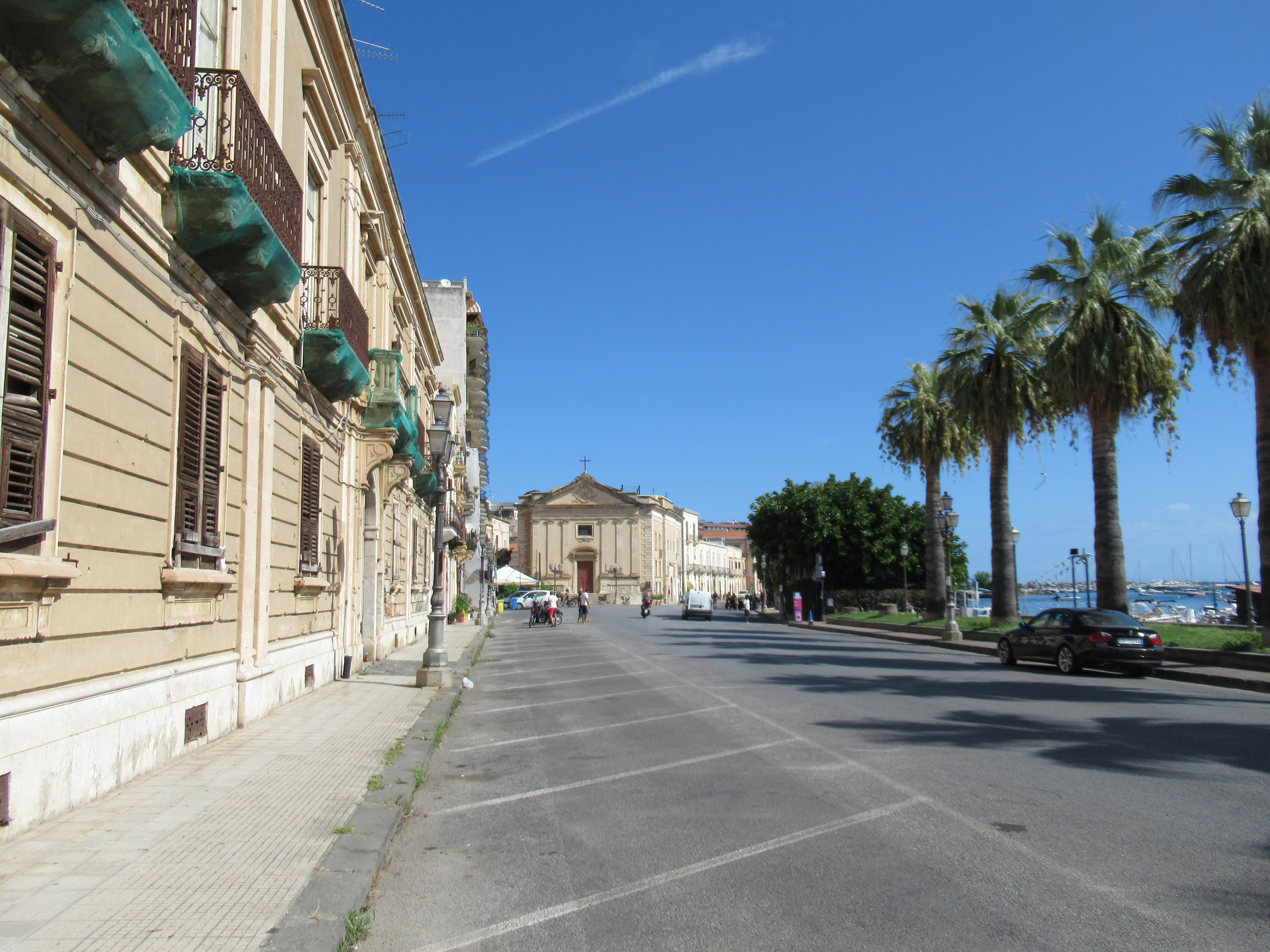
Lungomare Garibaldi

- Lungomare Garibaldi
- Via Capitano Massimo Scala
- Via Cumbo Borgia
- Piazza Duomo
- Via Domenico Piraino
- Via Francesco Crispi
- Via G.B. Impallomeni
- Via Giacomo Medici
- Via Luigi Rizzo
- Via Umberto I
- Piazza Caio Duilio
- Piazza della Repubblica
- Piazza Roma

== Society ==
=== Demographic evolution ===
Historical population

Year	Pop.	±%
1861	10,861	—
1871	12,841	+18.2%
1881	13,699	+6.7%
1901	16,214	+18.4%
1911	17,587	+8.5%
1921	20,573	+17.0%

Year	Pop.	±%
1931	19,064	−7.3%
1936	19,800	+3.9%
1951	22,013	+11.2%
1961	24,137	+9.6%
1971	27,204	+12.7%
1981	30,607	+12.5%

Year	Pop.	±%
1991	31,541	+3.1%
2001	32,108	+1.8%
2011	32,146	+0.1%
2021	30,397	−5.4%

Source: Data from ISTAT

=== Foreign ethnicities and minorities ===
As of December 31, 2023, foreigners residents in the municipality were 1,125, i.e. 3.7% of the population. The largest groups are shown below:

1. Bangladesh 248
2. Romania 152
3. Albania 125
4. Romania 168
5. Philippines 76
6. Poland 57
7. India 53
8. China 48
9. Sri Lanka 48
10. Morocco 38

== Museums ==
=== Sea Museum ===
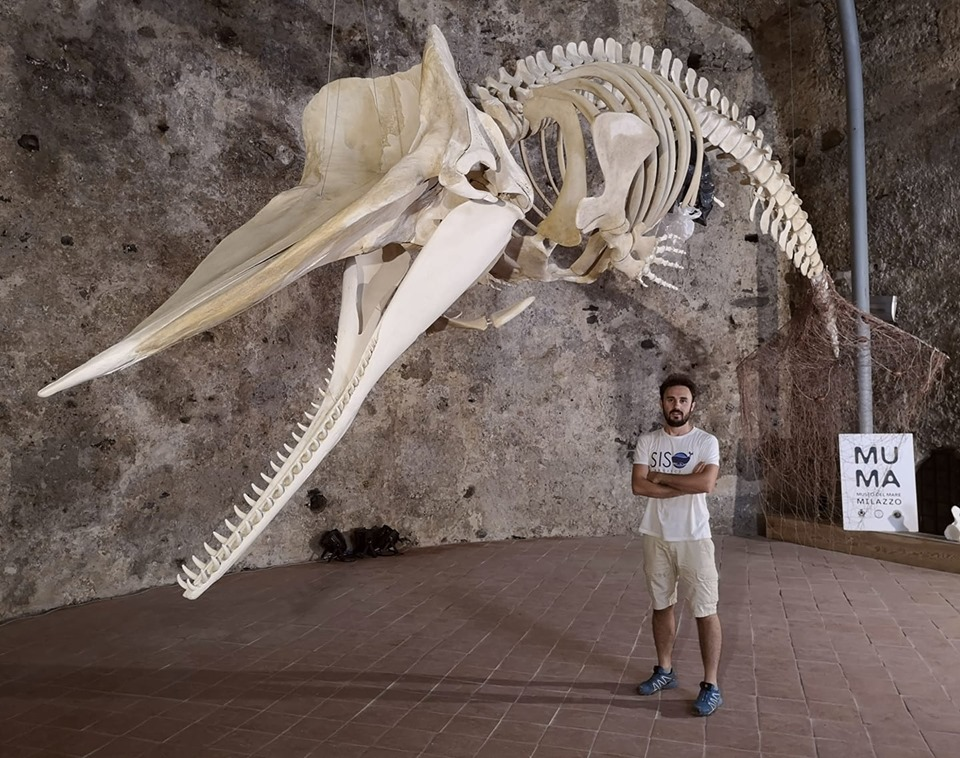
The skeleton of the Sperm Whale and the founder of the Museum, Carmelo Isgrò

The MuMa - Milazzo Sea Museum is located in a deconsecrated church from 1527 inside the Bastion of Santa Maria located in the castle of Milazzo. In fact, the church of Santa Maria stood here in 1527, the first cathedral of Milazzo, later transformed into a military bastion and in 1825 into a penal colony, or a prison where prisoners were forced to do forced labor.

The MuMa was founded in 2019 by the biologist Carmelo Isgrò who stripped the flesh of a 10-ton sperm whale that had beached along the coast of the Promontory of Capo Milazzo and that had died because of an illegal net "la spadara" that had gotten caught in its tail and because of the plastic it had ingested.

The biologist then reconstructed the skeleton by repositioning the plastic found and the illegal net respectively in the belly and tail of the skeleton of the Sperm Whale exposed as a warning for the new generations. Inside it, numerous scientific and artistic activities are held aimed at raising awareness of the protection of the marine environment: conferences, photographic exhibitions, musical concerts.

=== Archaeological Antiquarium "Domenico Ryolo" ===
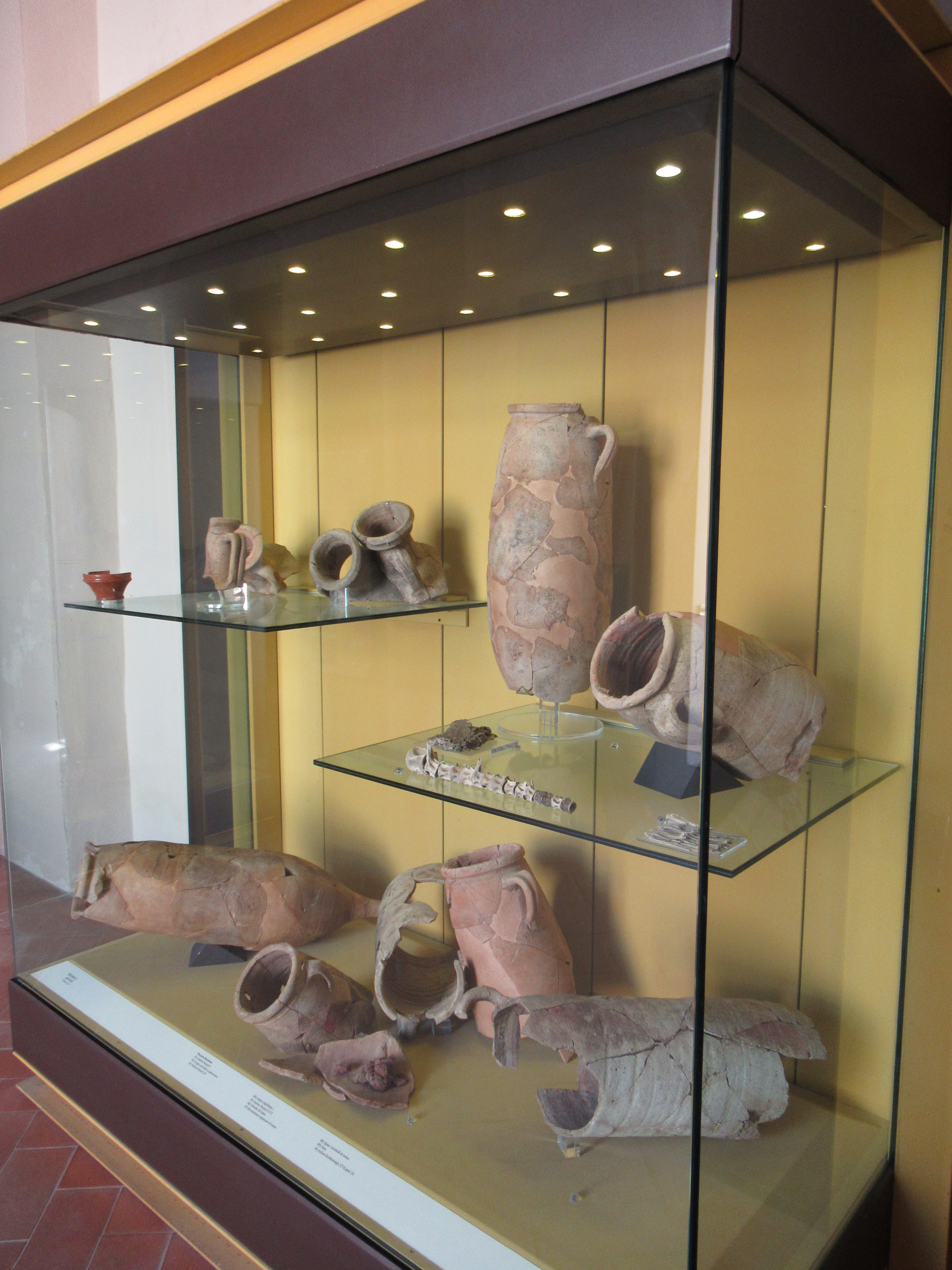
Findings shown at the Archaeological Antiquarium "Domenico Ryolo"

The building that houses the museum (a white construction with an elegant horizontally developed façade) is a former Bourbon women's prison built in 1816 with the typical features of military buildings of the time. The collection displays finds discovered during research in the areas of the necropolis. Among the various objects, important evidence of ceramic production both imported from Corinth and produced in the Strait area in imitation of Chalcidian ceramics, all probably from the workshops of Zancle (Messina) and Mylai itself. We can also see clay boats and rowers from the second half of the 3rd century BC, rare pieces symbolizing, it seems, the journey of souls and, in addition, funerary objects dating back to a period between the end of the 5th and the 3rd century BC.

=== Tuna Fishing Museum ===
The Tuna Fishing Museum hosts two sections:

- The Tuna Fishing Museum sector with photographs, texts, objects and various equipment, and with the integration of schematic and executive drawings and educational cards, with boats still existing integrated with small wooden models of those disappeared, with anchors and equipment used in fishing and in the processing and transformation of the catch;
- The Maritime Activities sector: section with maps, nautical and survey charts, drawings, project documents, nautical instruments (compasses, sextants). Also open to contributions from various associations and exhibition of underwater archaeology finds.

The warehouses retain intact the charm of the notable stratifications of the walls that occurred over the different eras; their transformation, which occurred mostly in height, is today easily readable in several points of the sea front. They occupy approximately 1,000 square meters and have entrances both on the street front and on the sea side, through which, once, the boats used for tuna fishing were brought in and stored.

== Traditions ==
The Patron Saint of Milazzo, Saint Stephen is solemnly celebrated on the first Sunday of September. The Co-Patron, Francis of Paola, is solemnly celebrated on the first Sunday of May, while two days later (usually on a Tuesday) the feast of the Berrettella is celebrated, that is, the headdress that the saint often used to wear during his stay in Milazzo, which lasted from 1464 to 1467. On a lesser scale, the feast of the Protector, Saint Papino martyr, is celebrated on 17 and 28 June with a Solemn Celebration in the church of the same name. There are many other religious feasts, such as Saint Joseph, John the Baptist, Anthony of Padua, Marina the Monk, Maria Goretti and Mark the Evangelist.

== Economy ==
=== Agriculture and fishing ===
During its history, Milazzo, compared to the province to which it belongs, has always had good economic resources. At the beginning, a robust agriculture, floriculture and fishing were the foundations of an intense trade. These sectors are still alive today.

=== Industry ===
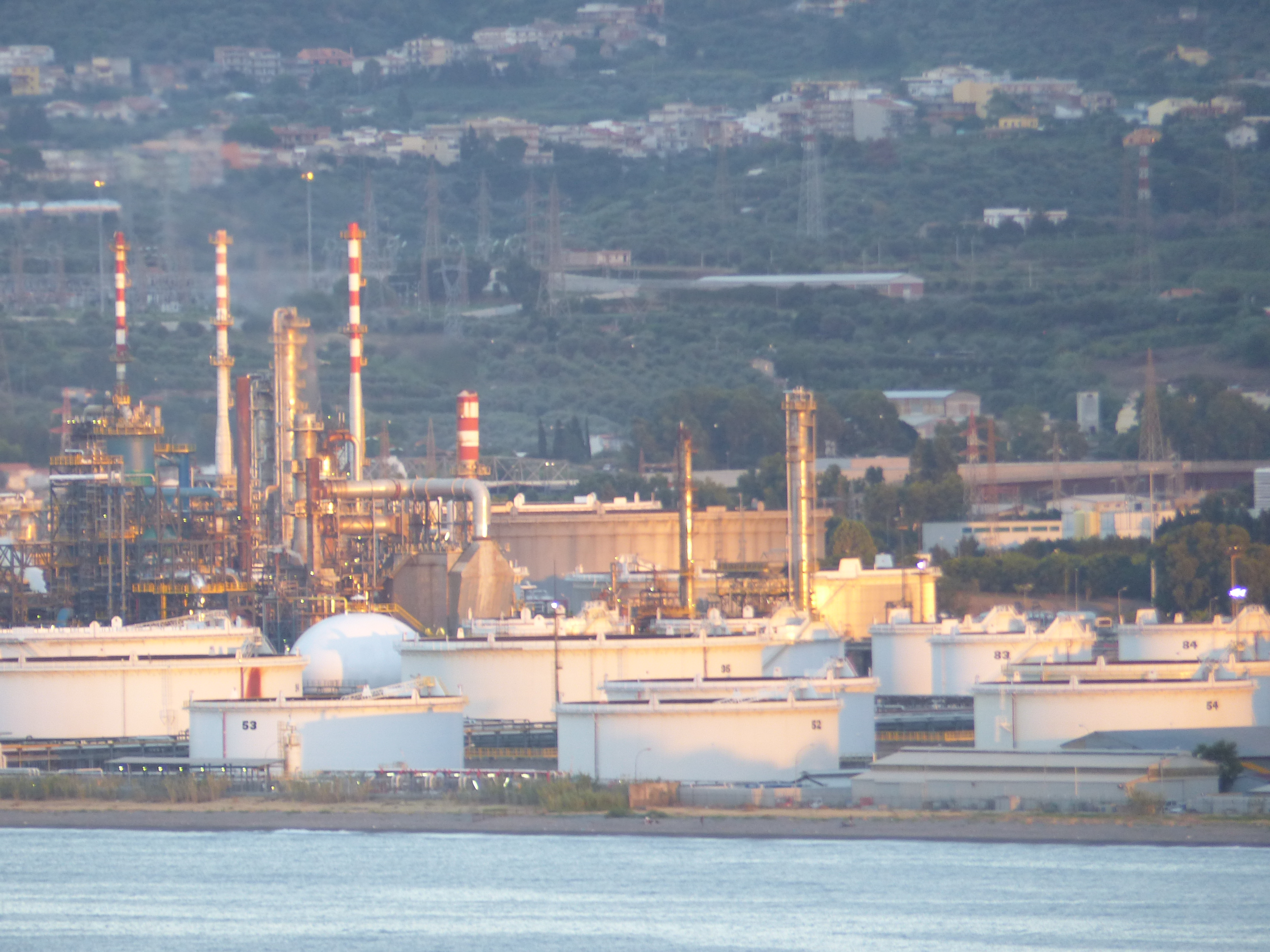
Milazzo Refinery

In the 1960s and 70s of the 20th century, the exploitation of environmental resources, the establishment of factories and the development of communications gave a boost to the spread of industrial activities (in the Industrial-ASI area of Giammoro, belonging to the neighbouring municipality of Pace del Mela), of large industries such as the Milazzo Refinery controlled by Q8 and Agip Petroli, the Edipower Power Plant of the shareholder group A2A and Iren, the Edison Thermal Power Plant (now owned by the Milazzo Refinery), the Duferdofin Nucor Steelworks belonging to the Tirreno Steelworks, and many other medium and small industries of different kinds.

=== Commerce and services ===
Milazzo has also been a protagonist in the tertiarization process: banks and insurance, advertising, publishing and media at a local level. The city has a good level of commercial activities, and has recently optimized the sector with the presence and expansion of shopping centers and large distribution areas of national and international brands.

=== Tourism ===
There are also port activities, which are divided into commercial (ferrous materials, hydrocarbons) and tourism (ships and hydrofoils to and from the Aeolian Islands, Naples and Ustica). Tourism is very important, with the presence of many tourist-receptive activities (hotels, B&Bs, restaurants); the sector is constantly growing, especially with the frequent arrival of cruise ships (projects are underway for the implementation of this initiative).

== Transportation ==
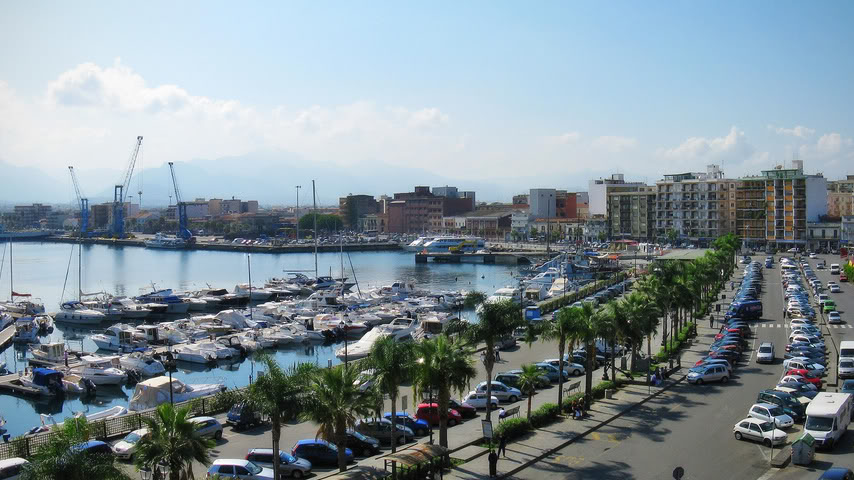
Port of Milazzo

The port of Milazzo is a departure point for ferries to the Aeolian Islands and Naples. The port of Milazzo was built in 1843, on the initiative of a minister of the Kingdom of the Two Sicilies, before the Italian unification.

Milazzo is connected to the Autostrada A20, with its own Milazzo-Aeolian Islands junction. On the border with San Filippo del Mela, there is the state highway 113 Settentrionale Sicula. The city is served by a road axis that connects the city centre with the various hamlets of the municipal territory.

The Milazzo railway station was initially located a short distance from the city center, in Piazza Marconi. At the end of 1991, it was decommissioned and replaced by a new one, located in the hamlet of Parco Nuovo and approximately 3 km from the city center, due to the modification of the Palermo-Messina railway line between Patti and San Filippo del Mela-Santa Lucia del Mela. It is connected to the port and the city center by two SAIS Autolinee bus lines: line n.5 Port - Station and line n.4 Port - Station - Hospital.

== Sport ==
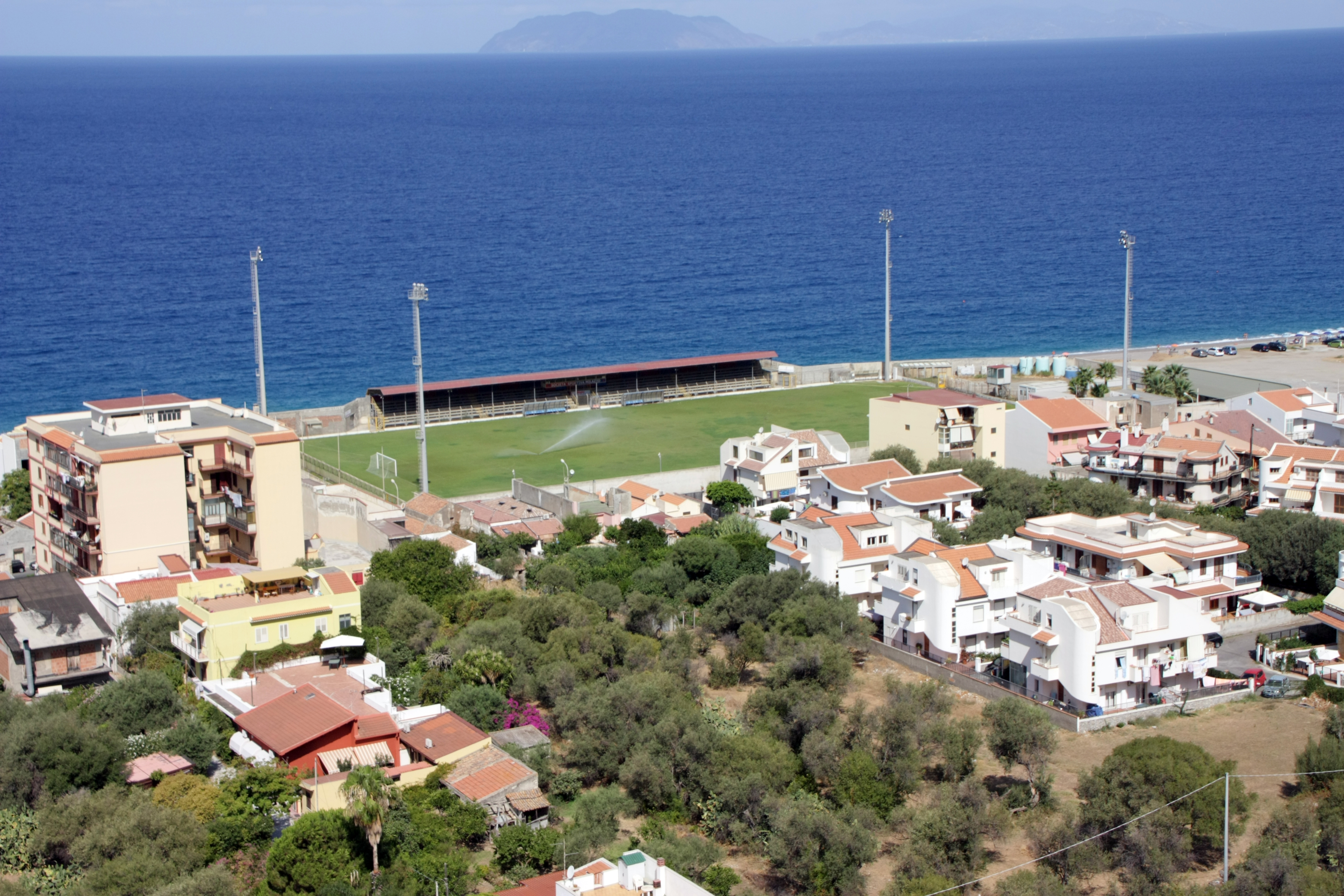
Municipal Stadium Marco Salmeri in Milazzo

Società Sportiva Milazzo, commonly known as SS Milazzo or Milazzo, is a football club based in Milazzo, who compete in Eccellenza Sicily, the fifth tier of the Italian football league system. The club was founded on 16 December 1830 by Giovanni Impallomeni, via a press release on "Gazzetta di Messina e delle Calabrie". The team's colours are red and blue.

== Notable residents ==
- Jean Lanti Prevost (born Salvatore Giovanni Riggitano; 1876–1960), paternal grandfather of Pope Leo XIV.

== See also ==
- S.S. Milazzo
- Taberna Mylaensis
