= Pironti =

Surname

Pironti is an Italian surname. Notable people with the surname include:

- Giordano Pironti (c. 1210–1269), Italian aristocrat, papal bureaucrat
- Massimiliano Pironti (born 1981), Italian painter

== See also ==
- Pironi
