= Siege of Messina (1848) =

Siege in the Sicilian revolution of 1848

- Part of Sicilian revolution of 1848
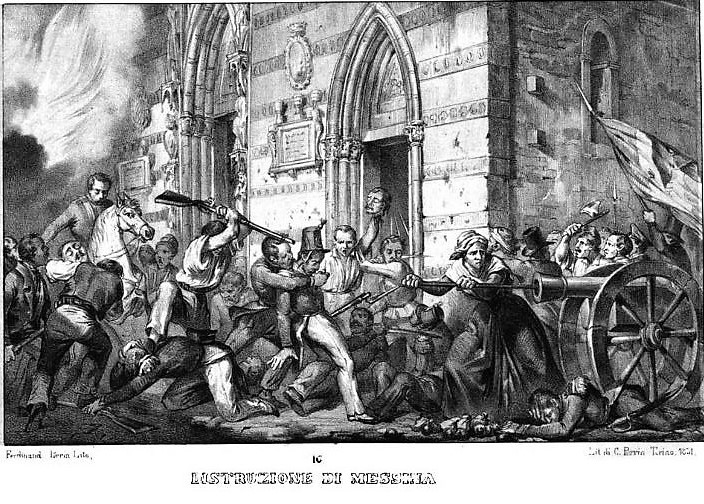
- Messina, 1848: clashes between the Bourbon royalists and the insurgents
Date	September 1848
Location	Messina, Sicily
Result	Neapolitan victory: The Bourbons of Naples regain control of Messina

Belligerents
Army of the Two Sicilies	Kingdom of Sicily

Commanders and leaders
Carlo Filangieri	

Strength
25,000	6,000

The siege of Messina during the Sicilian Revolution of 1848 was the final moment in a series of events that, from January to September of that year, pitted the forces of the Sicilian insurgents and those of the Bourbon army against each other in Messina, which, after a series of defeats, recaptured the city at the end of a heavy bombardment. Rather than a siege in the classical sense of the term, it can be described as a very long military operational cycle, with an uninterrupted succession of clashes of varying magnitude and scope.

== Context ==
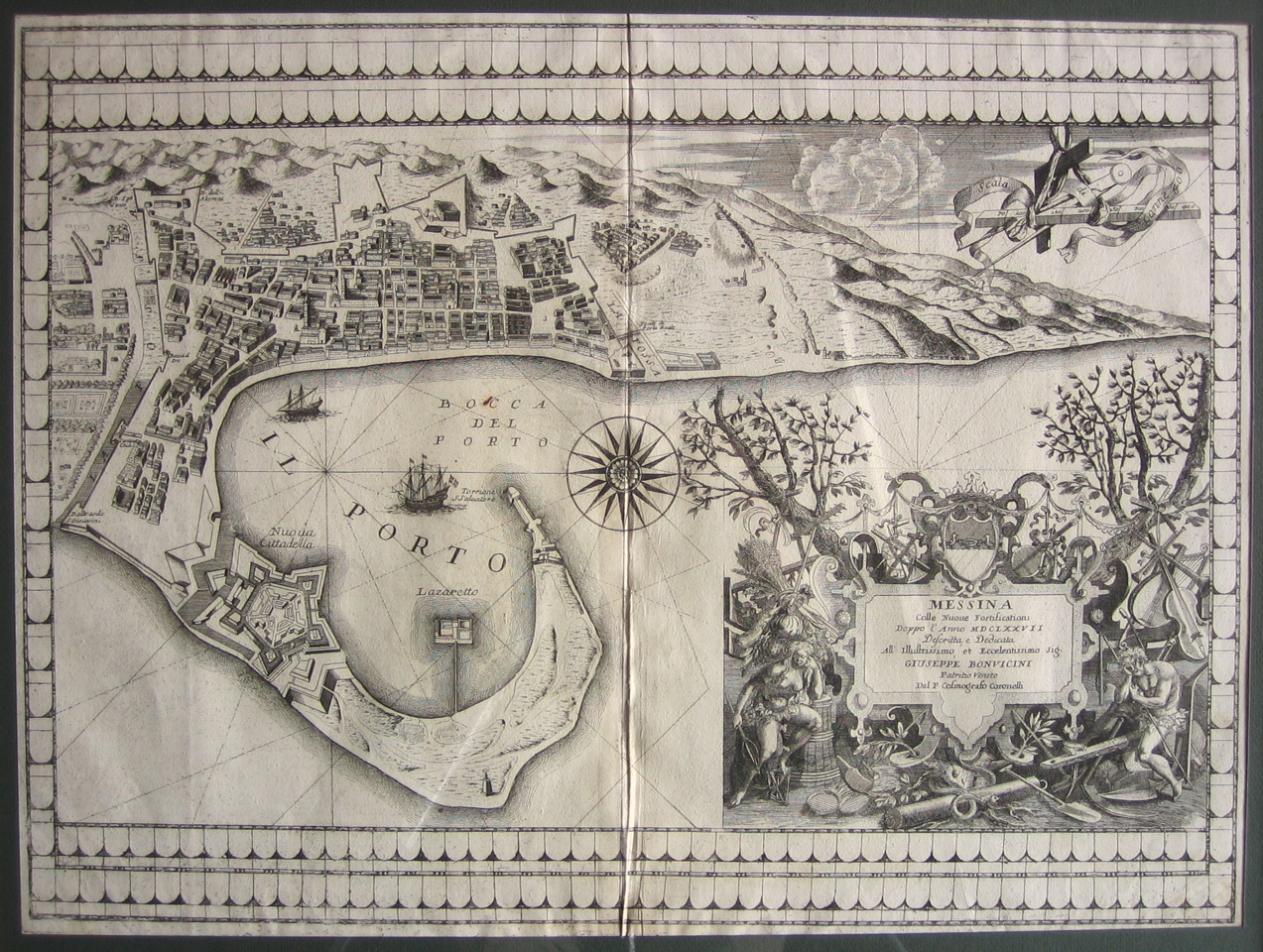
17th-century plan of the port of Messina

=== The fortified system ===
The port of Messina consists of a peninsula that starting from the southern end of the city turns north and then west in the shape of a sickle. At the starting point of this small peninsula, a massive fortress, known as the Citadel of Messina, formed by a pentagonal construction protected by deep moats and ramparts, had been built after Messina's great insurrection of 1674–78 against the Spaniards. In addition, on the other end of the peninsula there was another, smaller fortress, Fort San Salvatore, flanked by Fort Real Basso, located in front on the city beach. This complex of fortifications entirely barred the entrance to the harbor. On the opposite side, the Citadel at the point where it connected with the mainland also had a fortified arsenal and another fort, Fort Don Blasco.

Three other forts still existed to guard the city of Messina, those of Gonzaga, Rocca Guelfonia and Castellaccio, but they did not constitute a system with those placed at the port. There were also military garrisons at the prisons and the civic hospital. Messina was thus guarded by as many as seven different fortresses of varying sizes, among which the massive Citadel stood out.

=== The anti-Bourbon uprisings ===
==== September 1847 ====
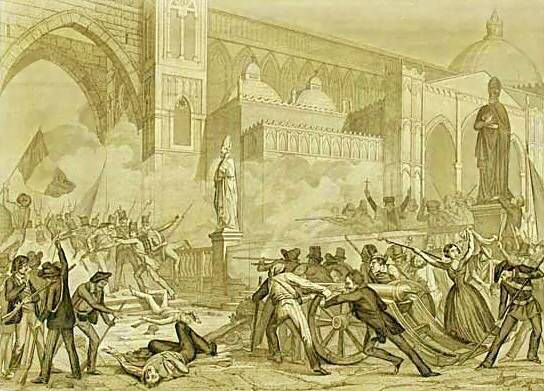
The Sicilian Revolution of 1848 in Palermo in an old print

The Sicilians' hostility to Bourbon rule was due to a variety of reasons, including the suppression of all forms of autonomy and the dominance of Neapolitan influences, the island's poverty-stricken condition, the harsh police regime, and the violations of commitments made by the governments in Naples.

In this context, Messina had become in Sicily one of the epicenters of the clandestine anti-Bourbon political network, along with Palermo and Catania, in connection with exiles residing on the neighboring island of Malta. Already on March 2, 1822, four liberals who had participated in an insurrectional attempt in Messina had been shot, namely the priest Giuseppe Brigandì, Salvatore Cesareo, Vincenzo Fucini, and Camillo Pisano. Many other Sicilians who had taken part in the movement were instead sentenced to prison or forced into exile.

Another insurrectionary attempt in Messina had taken place on September 1, 1847, but had been crushed by the Bourbon troops within hours. The insurgents, led by Giovanni Krymi, Antonio Pracanica and Paolo Restuccia, had gathered in front of the square in front of Messina Cathedral, with improvised weapons and a kind of uniform, consisting of a broad white smock and a wide-brimmed hat with a tricolor cockade on it. Bourbon troops came out of the Citadel and attacked the patriots, a violent clash that lasted many hours and ended with the defeat of the insurrection. A heavy repression by the Bourbon authorities then followed. Some insurgents were sentenced to death, many others forced to flee for their lives. The police also severely tortured the Abbot Giovanni Krymi, the priest Carmine Allegra and the chaplains Simone Gerardi and Francesco Impalà, but did not succeed in making them denounce others. Nevertheless, the Bourbon authorities ordered the closure of cultural clubs and associations and placed the university under control. All this, however, had strengthened the opposition to the regime, which now extended to all social classes and could rely on an extensive and ramified network of artisan associations, religious orders, monasteries, and academic circles.

The sudden insurrection that broke out in Palermo in early 1848 had freed almost all of Sicily from Bourbon rule, which was much hated on the island. However, the Bourbon army had taken care to retain the rule of the Citadel of Messina, which was large in size, powerfully fortified, and because of its location apt to constitute a real bridgehead for the reconquest of Sicily. The Citadel had about 300 cannons and a strong garrison, secure behind walls and moats.

==== January 29/February 21, 1848 ====
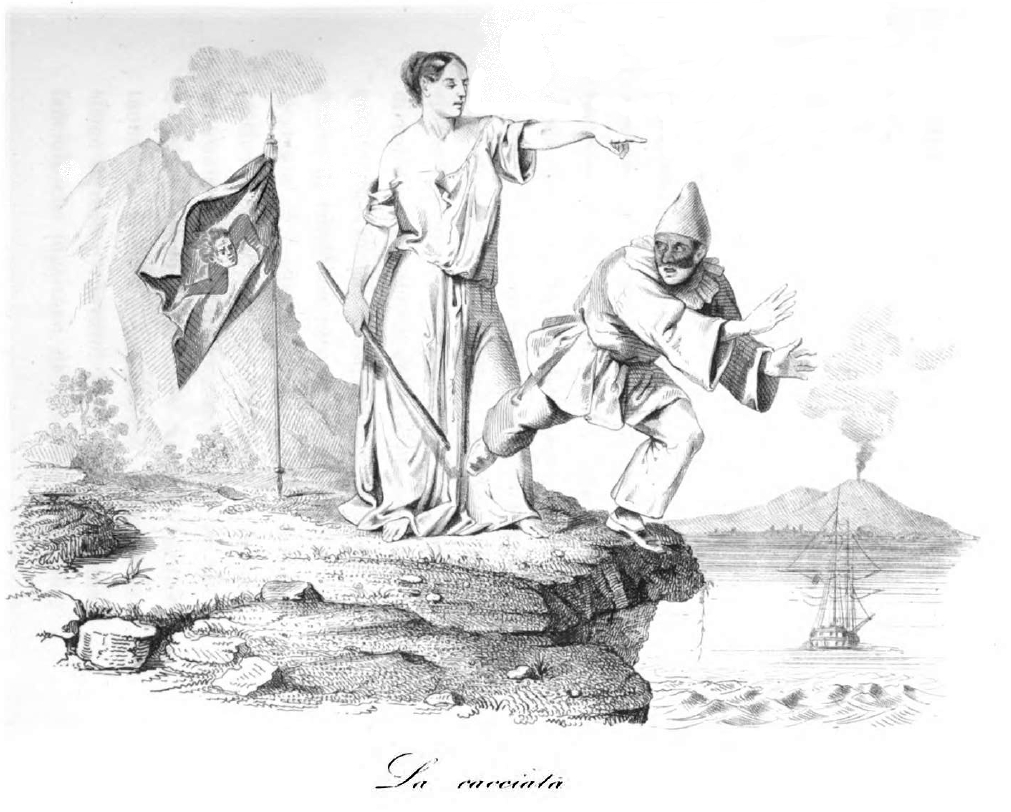
Allegorical print of the time depicting the expulsion of the Neapolitan troops from Sicily.

The citizens of Messina thus did not resign themselves to the defeat of the 1847 uprising and reconstituted a revolutionary committee in early January, with the collaboration of patriot Giuseppe La Masa.

On January 12, Palermo had risen up under the leadership of La Masa and Rosolino Pilo, and on the 23rd the Bourbon monarchy in Sicily had been declared overthrown.

On January 28 a public security and war committee was also created in the city, chaired by lawyer Gaetano Pisano, which decided in favor of the insurrection for the following day. In the course of the night the uprising was prepared and at nine o'clock on the morning of January 29, the people of Messina took to the streets en masse, improvisedly armed with hunting rifles, old firearms such as muskets or even white weapons such as sabers, rapiers, and knives. The insurgent committee tried to negotiate with the commander in charge, General Cardamona, but he refused. The Bourbon command, which included Generals Cardamona, Busacca and Nunziante and the Duke of Bagnoli, had received orders from King Ferdinand II to hold Messina at all costs, as the city represented the indispensable bridgehead for the reconquest of insurgent Sicily. The Bourbon high officials therefore decided to have the city bombarded with the numerous cannons and mortars at their disposal in the many fortresses, to which were still added the mobile artillery placed in the so-called Terranova plain, in front of the Citadel, and those of the warship "Charles III." The first victims were a child, killed while in his mother's arms, and an elderly woman. Taking advantage of the massive bombardment, Bourbon troops came out of the fortresses and attacked the insurgents, in an attempt to regain possession of the city. Their action, however, met with compact resistance from the entire citizenry, which saw together men, women and even children fighting against the Neapolitans. Among others, Francesco Munafò, Antonio Lanzetta and Rosa Donato, later nicknamed "artillerywoman of the people," distinguished themselves. Among the many Sicilian fighters who had to distinguish themselves in the long battle, Stefano Crisafulli also stood out. The Bourbon forces, contained and then counterattacked, were forced to retreat inside the forts.

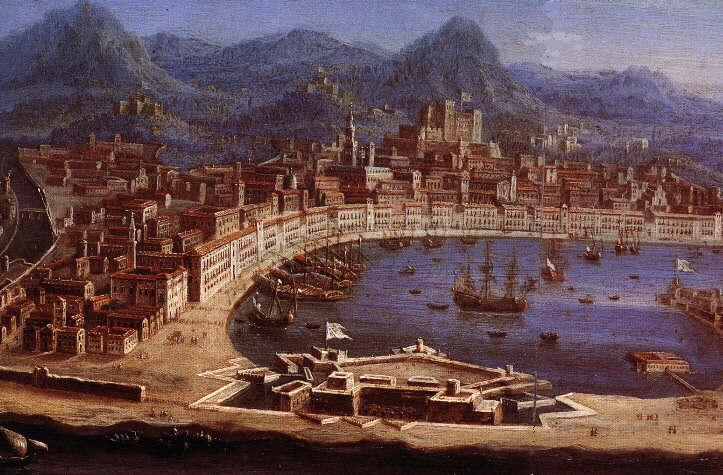
Messina in an old print

General Cardamono, furious, ordered the bombardment of the city to continue purely in retaliation, but this did not frighten the insurgents. On the contrary, Messina lit up festively, and the elderly Salvatore Bensaja walked the streets of the city at the head of a band playing warlike marches. In the meantime, the insurgents' forces were strengthened by the influx from the countryside and inland towns of groups of volunteers, with tricolor cockade on their heads and tricolor sashes slung over their shoulders, armed with firearms and white weapons. The Patriots' Public Security Committee assumed the organization of the struggle and together with the administration of the city and territory.

On January 30, General Cardamono attempted a counterattack to unite the Bourbon divisions scattered around the city, but it was decisively repelled. The attack by the Neapolitans, carried out with infantry and artillery, had moved from the entrenched camp known as Terranova, coming out of the Saracen gate, to try to break into the Pizzillari quarter. Sicilian squad leader Munafò, who was lightly wounded in the clash, pushed back the royals, also inflicting many casualties on them. However, on January 31 it was the insurgents who went on the offensive, targeting the smaller garrisons and weaker forts: the Neapolitan garrisons at the civic hospital and prisons and those placed at Rocca Guelfonia and Castellaccio surrendered practically without a fight. The following day, February 1, the Sicilians attacked Fort Gonzaga, which surrendered after almost no resistance. At this point only the Citadel and the forts attached to it remained in the hands of the Neapolitan royal troops. The Bourbon command attempted another counterattack and to do so ordered troops to raid the women's monastery of Santa Chiara. The Bourbons broke through a solid perimeter wall of the convent and raided it, to the dismay of the nuns. The monastery was then immediately used as a fortress by the Neapolitans, who attempted from this point to carry out a sortie against the insurgents. It was, however, energetically repelled by the Sicilians.

The military failures were compounded by political ones. The Archbishop of Messina, Monsignor Francesco di Paola Villadicani, outraged by the desecration of the sanctuary by the Bourbon army, issued an excommunication against those responsible. The English and French consuls, on the other hand, presented their protests to the Royal Military Command for the manner in which the repression had been carried out.

A truce phase began at that point. The insurgents received some aid from other parts of Sicily, while the Bourbon government attempted to detach Messina from the rest of the island, offering it a special status and its proclamation as the island's capital to replace Palermo. The insurrectionary committee responded, however, that the city preferred destruction to betrayal.

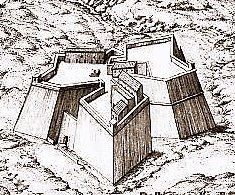
Fort Gonzaga

===== The taking of fort Real Basso and the fortified camp of Terranova =====
The insurgents controlled the entire city proper, but it could by no means be said to be safe as it was overlooked by the Citadel and the forts attached to it. Their goal therefore had to be the capture or neutralization of the massive fortified system in the hands of the Neapolitans. Such an intent seemed extremely difficult. The insurgents had about 4,000 men with improvised weaponry and little or no training, against an equivalent number of well-armed and trained Bourbons. There were 77 cannons on the Sicilian side, 50 of them from the fortress of Milazzo that had surrendered a short time earlier, against 300 on the royal side. To this already great disparity in resources was added the problem of breaking through the defensive walls of mighty fortresses. The Sicilian troops, on the other hand, had the moral and, if necessary, the physical support of the entire city of Messina. Moreover, the Bourbon troops had shown little will to fight in previous clashes and had often surrendered easily, as in the case of the Rocca Guelfonia, Castellaccio and Fort Gonzaga.

The commanders of the insurgents, who at the time were officers Porcelli, Longo, Scalia and Mangano, set as their first objective the conquest of Fort Real Basso. They therefore proceeded to build on the night of February 22 a parallel of barrels and sacks filled with earth, behind which the cannons were placed. At sunrise the Sicilian artillery opened fire on the enemy, who responded from all the forts. The duel was decidedly uneven, as the number of Bourbon pieces overwhelmed that of the Sicilians: 300 to 77. The insurgents, however, withstood the extremely intense fire and managed to open a breach in the walls of Fort Real Basso. It was then attacked en masse by the Sicilians, who filled the moat and then either broke through the breach or climbed the ramparts with escalators. The Neapolitan garrison surrendered immediately and the rebels seized about 30 large-caliber artillery pieces.

The determination of the Sicilian fighters was great, as some examples show. At the time of the attack on Fort Real Basso, the orphanage's band, which had gone there to encourage the fighters, was also present. Salvatore Bensaja's son, Giuseppe, fell during the final assault on Fort Real Basso, mortally wounded while raising the tricolor flag on the stands. The news of his death did not dismay his father, who declared that since his son had died gloriously for his country, he should not mourn his death.

At the same time other insurgent units attacked the so-called Terranova plain, which was the set of ancillary and secondary structures in front of the Citadel, which included the Don Blasco blockhouse, the Saracen gate, the arsenal, and the local barracks. Also in the same area was the monastery of Santa Chiara, which had been occupied by the Bourbons and turned into a makeshift fort. This complex of structures was stormed and conquered by the Sicilians, forcing the Bourbons to fall back inside the gigantic Citadel.

===== The Sicilian regular army. The birth of the "camiciotti" =====
However, the royal artillery insisted on the bombardment, which lasted from the morning of February 22 until the evening of the 24th. This reprisal bombardment of the city also elicited condemnation from politician and historian Adolphe Thiers in the French Chamber. Meanwhile, however, the Messinians managed to recover 17 naval guns from the rubble of the arsenal warehouses. General Cardamona was replaced in the meantime by Field Marshal Paolo Pronio, who also received troop reinforcements. A Bourbon counterattack succeeded in the afternoon of February 25 in retaking Fort Don Blasco.

For their part, the insurgents proceeded to reorganize their command structure. The revolutionary committee had Dr. G. Pisano as its chairman, although in fact the command of the insurgents on the military level temporarily passed to Ignazio Ribotti, a liberal and patriot who had been forced into exile in 1831 and had fought in Spain and Portugal, reaching the rank of colonel. The Sicilians made one last attempt to take the Citadel, ordering their artillery to fire at the Citadel itself and Fort San Salvatore, in an action that lasted for two days, March 7 and 8. The Bourbons retaliated by firing their own cannons on the city. While there was little damage on the massive fortifications in which the royals were entrenched, the damage to the built-up area of Messina was severe. As the Sicilians' artillery ammunition was now very low, the insurgents accepted the proposal of a truce of arms, which was routinely observed until the third week of April, although the Bourbon artilleries occasionally resumed fire on the city, causing damage and casualties and keeping the citizenry in a state of continuous apprehension.

This period was used by the new Kingdom of Sicily, proclaimed by the re-elected Sicilian Parliament and reopened on March 25, to try to create a regular army by the provisional government led by Ruggero Settimo. The first units formed had a uniform consisting of a dark blue blouse, a cap of the same color with a tricolor cockade, red insignia and gray trousers. The people soon nicknamed these soldiers "shirts" (camiciotti) because of the blouse they wore, and so they have gone down in history. The regular units were then joined by the National Guard, irregulars from the inland troops and, when necessary, by the sheer influx of citizens from Messina. On the other hand, there were few officers with valid technical training, which was indispensable for the kind of siege warfare waged, in which engineering and artillery, the so-called "scientific arms", were fundamental. In addition, the insurgent command had organizational problems.

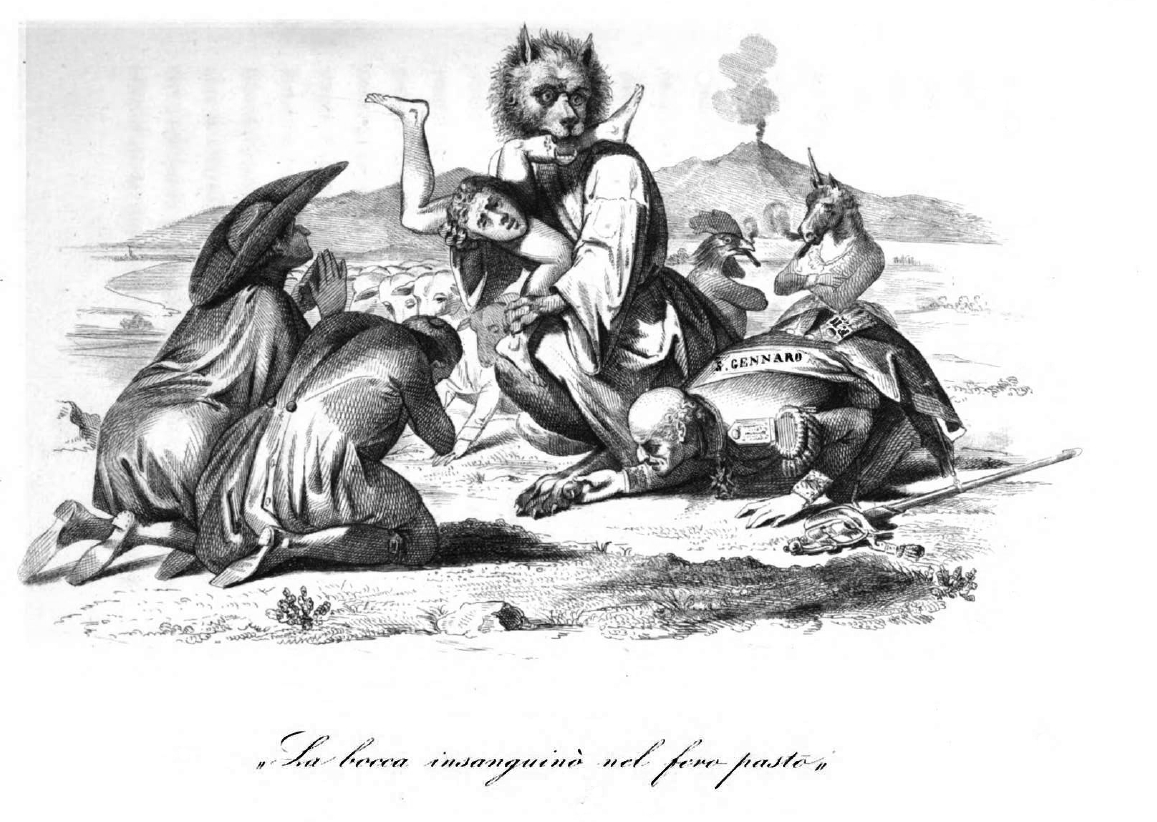
Satirical allegorical print depicting the suppression of the Sicilian Revolution by the Neapolitan government at the end of the 1848 rebellion.

==== Third phase: April 17-August 24 ====
The fragile truce was broken by the Bourbons, who launched another heavy bombardment of the city on April 17, firing from the Citadel and Fort San Salvatore. Meanwhile, large reinforcements of men and ammunition arrived for the Royals, who resumed the bombardment on April 21. That day was Good Friday of Easter week, and the citizens of Messina were all gathered in the churches for religious services, trusting in a respite from the bombardment for the sanctity of the day: "On the morning of the 21st day, the solemnity of Good Friday, the population, confident of a respite for the sanctity of the day, crowded into the churches and through the streets, as is customary, when suddenly a terrible bombardment of the city began, which lasted until late at night". On April 24, Easter Monday, the Bourbons launched an offensive. On both April 24 and 25, the Neapolitans bombarded the city and launched sorties from the Citadel toward the Terranova plain. However, the infantry attacks were repulsed by the Sicilians. The two sides then decided to sign an armistice.

After these events, the priest Giovanni Krymi, who had been sentenced to death for his participation in the insurrection of September 1, 1847, and had later been released from prison by the uprising at the beginning of the year, had a letter delivered to General Pronio, commander of the Bourbon troops at the Citadel, which was transmitted to him through the French vice-consul. In it, Krymi expressed his indignation as a Christian and a clergyman at "the plunder and massacre at the Monastery and the Church of the White Benedictines" for which the Bourbon troops had been responsible during the 1848 uprising in Palermo, and especially at Pronio's actions in Messina. The priest recalled that the general, who had come to fight in this city, had bombarded it "every day", but he especially reproached the Bourbon commander for having bombarded Messina even on Good Friday before Easter, and for having continued this operation even on days when the citizens had accepted an "armistice demanded of them by the Ministry of Naples". "For these and other reasons, Krymi formally challenged General Paolo Pronio to a duel. The message, which also appeared in the newspaper Il Procida, was entitled "Challenge of Giovanni Krymi to the bomber General Pronio".

Even the previously signed truce was broken, however, by Bourbon troops, who on June 5 launched another sortie in the direction of the Terranova plain, then repeated in the night. Both attacks broke against determined Sicilian resistance, whereupon the artillery of the royals resumed firing on the city. Fighting also continued on the sea: on June 15, in the Strait of Messina, Sicilian gunboats, commanded by Captain Vincenzo Miloro, confronted and forced a Neapolitan steam frigate to flee. On the night of the 17th the Bourbons attacked once again in the Terranova plain and once again were forced to retreat. Also participating in the clash on the Sicilian side were many improvised volunteers equipped with pikes and knives.

Although the insurgents continued to make partial gains, the citadel remained impenetrable and was able to hold the city, only a few hundred meters away, at gunpoint with its 300 cannons.

Even in the pauses between the actual bombardments, the artillery shots continued to fall on the citizens of Messina who were in the streets, on the roofs, or who lit lights, in short, on those who showed their presence: "It was not possible to do business in the public squares; it was not possible to walk the streets for domestic needs; it was not safe to stand for a few moments on a terrace; it was dangerous to put a small light on a window; in short, life was always troubled, uncertain and insecure. Pronio gave neither rest nor peace. He considered it an act of bravery to kill a poor woman or a child; he considered it a glory to take the house of a commoner or a rich citizen. Those were indeed very sad days, those eight months that passed under the tortures of this bombardment."

It was imperative for the Sicilians to conquer the great fortress, but this could not be done with a white-armed assault, which would have been crushed before the moats, the walls and the very numerous artillery: it was necessary to act with siege techniques, but there was a lack of both qualified men and means on the part of the insurgents. Meanwhile, the fighting continued, and from August 15 to 24, the Neapolitan artillery bombarded the city.

Civic morale remained high, however, and a song became popular among the people of Messina, defiantly denouncing the citadel's bombardment of the city and demanding freedom from Bourbon rule.

== The Bourbon siege ==
=== Preparations for the invasion ===
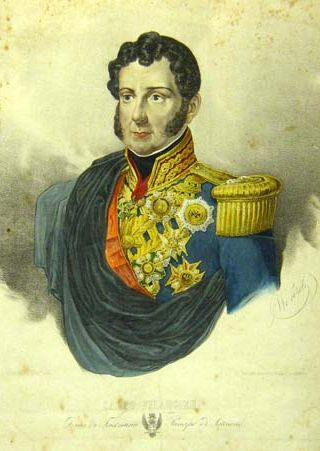
Bourbon general Carlo Filangeri

King Ferdinand II had provided for the crushing of Calabria's revolt during the summer and was now ready to invade Sicily to subject it once again to his rule. Preparations for the expedition began as early as the end of August. Its designated commander was the prince of Satriano, Lieutenant General Carlo Filangieri, the son of Gaetano Filangieri (the famous author of the Science of Legislation), a veteran of the Napoleonic army (he had been Joachim Murat's colonel) and undoubtedly the best of all Bourbon generals.

The expeditionary force included 18,000 infantrymen, 1,500 of the naval personnel embarked on the ships, plus the 5,000 men garrisoned in the Citadel, for a total of 24500 men engaged against Messina, with 450 cannons in total. Part of this army were the best units of the entire Bourbon army, namely the Swiss mercenaries. The superiority of forces was overwhelming on the Bourbon side, as the insurgents could count around 6,000 men.

Piero Pieri, an Italian military historian, reports the following calculations in this regard in his "Military History of the Risorgimento": "Two battalions of "camiciotti," 1,000 men in total, 400 artillerymen, 300 sappers of the Engineer Corps and 200 municipal guards; and in addition 500 navy gunners assigned to the batteries between Messina and Faro, who did not take part in the fight. In total the formations that we could call regulars amounted to 2,500 men, of whom 2,000 were at the points attacked. To these we had to add 2500 men from the squads; 500 National Guard men and 500 other men from the lifeboat crews; and in addition 2000 men from the squads stationed along the coast from Galati to Forza d'Agrò south of Messina, and from Torre Faro to Milazzo. On the whole, therefore, Messina had 6,000 men armed as best they could, unequally trained and without a real leader, against 25,000 soldiers representing the best part of the Bourbon army and with a leader, a veteran of the Napoleonic wars, of undeniable valor and energy." Among the 6,000 Sicilian units, only 5,000 were equipped with rifles. The gap was also great in artillery, with 112 cannons for the insurgents, 450 for the Bourbons. Citizens from all walks of life, rich and poor, clergy and laity, men and women, young and old, however, actively contributed to reinforcing the improvised fortifications to resist the expected attack by the Bourbons. Despite the huge disproportion of men and resources, on the order of 4 to 1 in favor of the Neapolitans, the final battle of the siege of Messina was exceptionally fierce.

=== The final attack in early September ===
The first attack by the royal troops took place on 3 September and was carried out with drastic measures, as the Bourbon generals had given orders to kill prisoners, and the Neapolitan units advanced, slaughtering civilians and destroying everything: "the enemy on its march killed defenceless men, burned houses, devastated and robbed everything". The Sicilian resistance, however, was extremely vigorous and forced the Bourbon units to retreat with a determined bayonet counterattack, after inflicting losses of many hundreds of men. The artillery of the Citadel, however, began to bombard the city with unprecedented intensity and continued to do so for the next few days, setting whole districts on fire or reducing them to rubble. The dense carpet bombing of the city continued uninterrupted for five days, using all kinds of projectiles: bombs and even incendiary shells. While the Bourbon artillery continued to bombard the city, Filangieri prepared another attack.

The operation consisted of a landing to the south of Messina, preceded and accompanied by an intense bombardment by the naval squadron (whose guns were firing on the consular road known as the Dromo and all the neighboring territory), which would coincide with direct bombardment from the forts and infantry action from the Citadel. The Sicilian troops sought to prevent the advance of the landed enemy, vastly superior in numbers and means, by concentrating their defense on a series of defensive lines. The "camiciotti" and volunteers took up positions successively at the villages of Contesse, then Gazzi, then Borgo San Clemente, from where they were driven out only after many hours of battle and following house-to-house fighting. The two villages of Contesse and Gazzi and Borgo San Clemente ended up practically destroyed by the Bourbon army: the houses that escaped the bombardment were set on fire by the soldiers through phosphorus bombs, while the civilians were shot on the spot. After losing these three lines of resistance, the Sicilians took up positions behind the Zaera River, which was reinforced by improvised entrenchments that rested on sturdy buildings. The Neapolitans attacked again using the artillery at their disposal to crush the insurgents, firing from the Citadel, from the sea with the fleet and with mobile artillery. The Bourbon attack now proceeded from two directions: from the Citadel toward the Terranova plain and from the landing beachhead in the direction of the Zaera River. However, the offensive essentially stalled in the face of the Sicilians' extremely tenacious defence, and the royal troops retreated in panic and disorder, to the point where there was talk among them of re-embarking and fleeing. Filangieri, seeing his troops so demoralised and ready to flee, ordered the fleet to move away to deny the troops any idea of retreat. The Bourbon commander, however, was very worried and spent sleepless nights keeping watch over his men. Meanwhile, in Messina, the population was still determined to fight, and there were even clerics and women inciting the men to fight. Much of the city, however, had been burned or destroyed by the relentless bombardment, which had killed or forced many of the inhabitants to flee. The next morning, 7 September, the Bourbons resumed their offensive with the same modus operandi as the day before: massive artillery bombardments, fires set on buildings by phosphorus bombs used by the soldiers, and infantry actions that raked the ground, killing everyone they found. The Sicilian defenders held their ground tenaciously, but the constant influx of enemy troops, who outnumbered them, led to the fall of all the strongholds, which were nevertheless defended to the end.

The Collereale hospice was also set on fire by Bourbon soldiers, who massacred the sick who were there: "The sick, the blind and the lame of the Hospice of Collereale were driven out with bayonet blows and entangled in the Bourbon ranks, they were all ruthlessly slain. All the houses in the hamlet of San Clemente, just before the Zaera stream, were burned and destroyed. On all sides there was nothing to be heard but groans and lamentations, on all sides nothing to be seen but mutilated corpses, women or children, soldiers or citizens, wounded and tormented in every posture or image of death".

The massacre of the inhabitants of the Hospice of Collereale, which housed the blind and lame, was also due to the drunken state in which most of the Bourbon soldiers found themselves: "Bayoneted out of their hospice, many blind and paralyzed people, supporting and guiding each other, felt their way up for shelter, for an escape: but entangled in the Neapolitan ranks, they were all cowardly slaughtered: the Neapolitan soldiers, and even more the Swiss, had been aroused during the night with wine and spirits, and most of them were in a state of fierce drunkenness".

The fighting continued with hand-to-hand clashes that took place house by house, until the insurgents' last major point of defense, the Magdalen convent, was surrounded and destroyed. Members of the clergy also took part in the defense of the monastery assaulted by the Neapolitans. The surviving "camiciotti" who defended it preferred to commit suicide than to fall alive into the hands of the Neapolitans by throwing themselves into a well. The names of seven of them are known: Antonino Bagnato, Carmelo Bombara, Giuseppe Piamonte, Giovanni Sollima, Diego Mauceli, Pasquale Danisi, and Nicola Ruggeri. Even the fall of the Magdalene monastery did not mark the end of the fierce battle, as the insurgents still defended themselves in the neighborhood behind, where the Swiss mercenaries proceeded to systematically set fire to all the buildings. The Bourbon troops did not spare even the City Hospital, to which they set fire, burning inside it many sick and wounded who were hospitalized there: "They set fire to the great Hospice, and burned inside it many sick and wounded." Having taken or rather destroyed the quarter that lay between Via Imperiale and Via Porta Imperiale, the Bourbon units advancing from the south, that is, from the naval bridgehead, joined those coming from the Citadel.

=== Violence against the defeated: massacres, rape, burning and looting ===
At this point, on the evening of September 7, the battle could be said to be practically over. Filangieri, however, did not dare to let his troops penetrate into the set of alleys that then made up the historic center of Messina: despite the fact that the regular Sicilian forces had been exterminated or forced to flee, the bombardment of the Bourbons continued over the undefended city, that is, the part that had not yet been occupied by the royals, for another seven hours. In the meantime, the soldiers of the Bourbon army engaged in looting and violence against the inhabitants: "The march of the Swiss and the Neapolitans was preceded by fires, followed by robbery, plunder, murder and rape. Women were raped in the churches, where they had hoped to find safety, and then slaughtered; priests were murdered on the altars, virgins cut to pieces, old people had their throats slit in their beds, whole families were thrown out of their windows or burned in their houses, loan funds were looted, sacred vessels were stolen."

There were numerous cases during the days of September 1848 of civilians being intentionally murdered by Bourbon troops, who in some cases raped women who had taken refuge in churches before murdering them, killed all the children and slaughtered sick people in their beds, as happened, for example, with the elderly farmer Francesco Bombace, an octogenarian, and Letterio Russo's daughter, who was beheaded and had her breasts amputated. A number of homes of foreigners living in Messina were also looted and destroyed, so much so that the English consul Barker reporting the incident to his government wrote that the houses of many English citizens residing there were reduced to ruin and that even a diplomat, the consul of Greece and Bavaria M. G. M. Rillian, despite the fact that he was in uniform, was wounded before his residence was also sacked and set on fire. Bourbon troops did not spare even religious buildings from looting. For example, the church of St. Dominic, rich in works of art, was first looted of its sacred objects, then set on fire and totally destroyed. The loss of life was incalculable. A Bourbon officer wrote to his brother immediately after the taking of Messina, stating that the Neapolitan divisions had recaptured the city with an extremely intense fire and "trampling corpses at every step for a distance of about two miles" and then commenting "How horrible! What a fire!" British Admiral Parker also condemned the actions of the Bourbons, and in particular the terror bombardment that continued over the city for a full eight hours after all resistance had ceased: "The greatest ferocity was displayed by the Neapolitans, whose fury continued unceasingly for eight hours after all resistance had ceased."

Messina was also troubled by the actions of common criminals sent by King Ferdinand II to Sicily against the insurgents, who, after harassing the Sicilians for months with brigandish acts (crimes, violence, theft, etc.), at the time of its fall, plundered the city, arriving in small boats from Calabria to loot.

Many of the inhabitants of Messina sought refuge by embarking and fleeing by sea, or by flocking to the French and British ships that were nearby. "From the first firing of the artillery, a multitude of merchant, transport, and fishing boats came out of the port of Messina, full of peaceful inhabitants, who united in crowding the English and French ships as in a place of health." The number of fleeing citizens was so great that the commanders of the French and English navies, who witnessed the battle, wrote to the Bourbon general Filangieri to grant a truce, since their ships could no longer take in other families fleeing from the plunder, so they begged him in the name of God to stop the military operations.

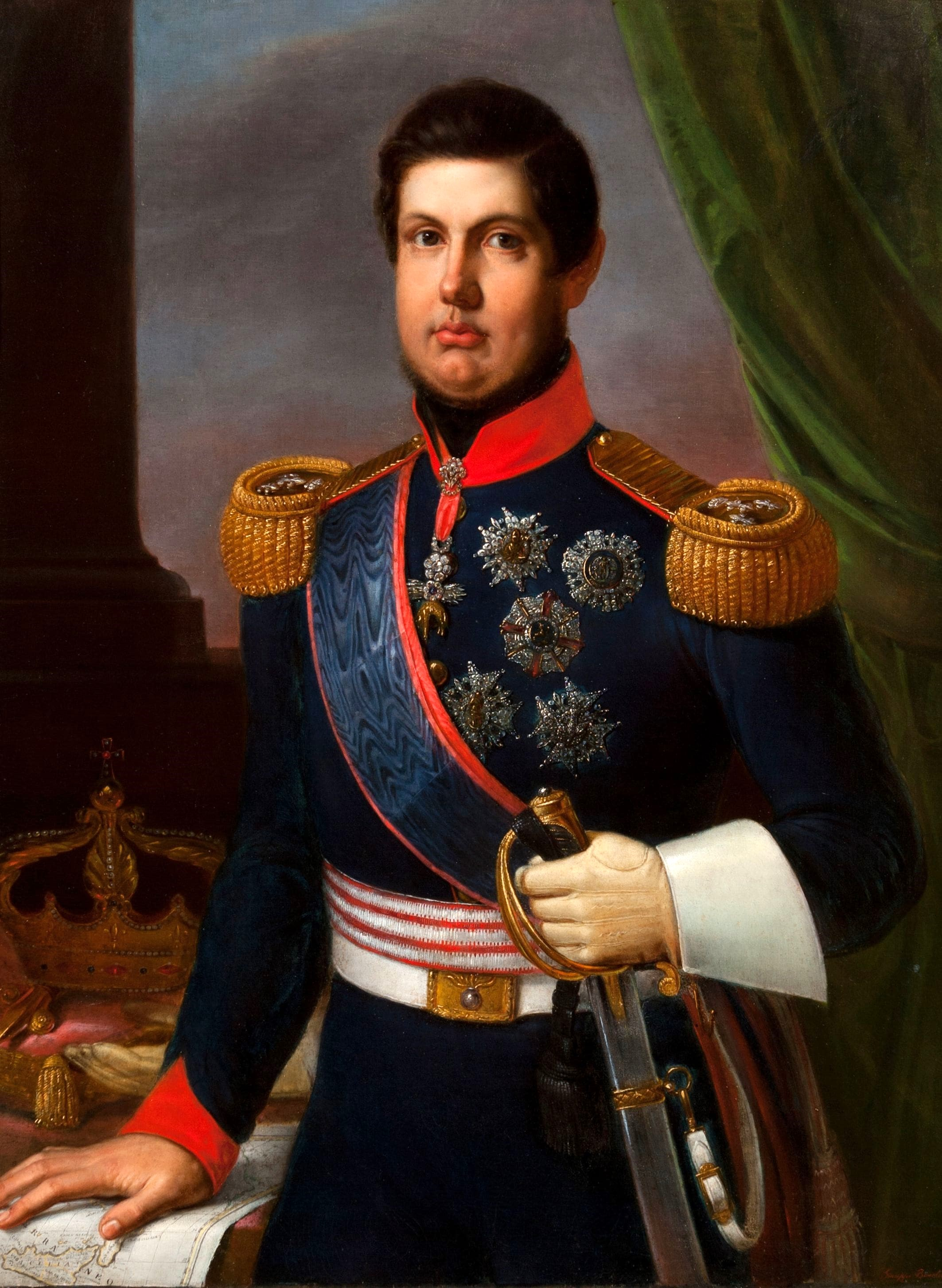
Ferdinand II was nicknamed "Bomb King" because of the bombing of Messina.

== Consequences ==
=== The consequences: human and material losses ===
The defeat of the insurgents in Messina marked the beginning of the end of the Sicilian Revolution of 1848-1849, with far-reaching political consequences. It is impossible to calculate the number of casualties that occurred in the course of the fierce battle, which lasted nine months and ended with a series of battles of exceptional violence. Pieri comments: "In truth, the defense of Messina was truly epic; three times the carefully prepared expedition with such overwhelming forces was on the verge of failure. The city had been half destroyed, but the bombardment had not tamed it, and the defenders had fought to the bitter end, so that it may be said that the city had not surrendered in spite of its inadequacy and lack of leaders. On the evening of September 7, the city was in flames, and the victors still feared new and desperate surprises".

The bombardment and the fires provoked protests from the foreign diplomats present in Messina, namely the consuls of Belgium, Denmark, France, the United Kingdom, the Netherlands, Russia and Switzerland.

The same report on the military operations in Messina in September 1848, published in Naples in 1849 by the Bourbon General Staff, admits that the bombardment had a devastating effect on Messina. It describes the effects of the royal artillery fire on the city during the days of the final battle: "The bombardment began at dawn on the 4th day [...] it began again with the same fury as the previous day; the fire resumed at sunrise and was only interrupted at nightfall. The condition of the city, because of this renewed attack, was exceedingly miserable and pitiful. [...] nothing could be seen but smoke and haze, nothing could be heard but the rumbling and bursting of the artillery; what damage and how much ruin Messina suffered in the midst of so much conflict is easier to imagine than to say; the neighborhoods closest to the batteries that exchanged fire presented no more than piles of ruins."

The following day the bombardment would be even more violent and destructive: "More terrible and bloody than the two already described was the 5th day; the fire began before dawn; [...] During the course of the day the bombardment became more active; the firing of the forts, which began one after the other on the hills and at the same time from the various points of the citadel, was so violent and continuous that it did not allow a moment of rest: it produced a very dense smoke, which enveloped everything in a thick haze, and the city seemed to be burning completely; during this sad spectacle, which lasted until evening, the houses were shaken by the multiple detonations, and the inhabitants fled from them, either because they were set on fire or because they had fallen into ruin. "At the end of the very long siege, the interior of the city seemed like a volcano; dense clouds of the blackest smoke rose on all sides".

In a private letter, a Bourbon front-line officer who had fought at Messina reported the outcome of the battle, saying that there were "many wounded and dead, both ours and theirs," while the city appeared almost completely destroyed, with only a few dwellings left intact: "I was horrified to see beautiful Messina reduced to a ruin, only a few houses remaining from three days of continuous cannon fire and shots from the citadel [...] The cries of those poor people who were left formed only desolation and distress."

On September 12, 1848, thus immediately after the defeat of the insurrection and in the immediacy of the Bourbon restoration, the designated mayor of the city of Messina, Marquis Cassibile, a notorious sympathizer of the Bourbon monarchy, wrote that there were few dwellings that could be used as military quarters for the occupying troops, the others having been burned or destroyed. The severity of the human and material losses was also recognized and denounced by foreign observers. A "Times" journalist sent to Messina reported in one of his articles on October 13, 1848, that the city had been largely destroyed, not only by bombardment, but to a good extent by fires set by Neapolitan soldiers. The destruction had also severely affected the villas and gardens, which, according to this journalist, had practically ceased to exist, and had not spared even the churches. The damage and destruction to Messina's artistic, cultural and historical heritage was also very serious, with the City Hall, the Archbishopric, the churches of San Domenico, San Nicola, Spirito Santo, Sant'Uno, Sant'Uomobono, Dei Dispersi, the monastery and the great church of the Benedictines being burned. The Magdalene monastery also contained a museum, founded in 1610, and a very rich library with codices with miniatures as well as valuable documents, most of which were destroyed: "The monastery was set on fire with barbaric fury and irreparably destroyed. The most dramatic aspect of that fire was the almost total destruction of the library and other works of art. Thus the city of Messina, already battered by mourning and ruin, had to tolerate also the brutal burning of the cultural element present, in large numbers, in the Benedictine monastery." The nuns of the sanctuary of Montalto, formerly the seat of the ancient Cistercian monastery of S. Maria dell'Alto, were forced to flee the bombardment, thus losing at least part of the precious objects of their monastery and part of the archives: the building was set on fire.

At the beginning of 1849, the Army of the Two Sicilies, under the command of Carlo Filangieri, Prince of Satriano, set out from Messina to reconquer the island. Catania was occupied on April 7 and Palermo on April 14, with the revolutionary leaders arrested or exiled.

=== Bourbon repression ===
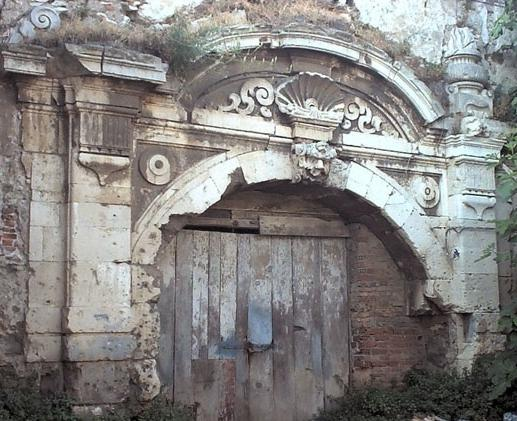
Gate of the Royal Citadel

The Bourbon government never fully regained its authority in Sicily after the repression. It had to rely on an alliance with the criminal world (the Bourbon chief of police from 1849 to 1860, Salvatore Maniscalco, used professional criminals against the revolutionaries) and on police repression of political dissent, which increased.

The military defeat of the revolt was followed by harsh Bourbon repression. A state of siege was imposed on Messina, which lasted for more than three years. In addition, General Filangieri decreed that the local university in Messina could only be attended by students from the province, effectively isolating it. Important cultural centers such as the "Circolo della borsa" and the "Gabinetto letterario" were also closed. Many prominent personalities and intellectuals of Messina who had participated in the great revolt were forced to flee and go into exile. Those who remained were often persecuted.

The Citadel of Messina continued to provide the Bourbon power with an instrument of domination and control over Messina, both with the latent threat of its cannons and garrison and as a prison for political prisoners. This huge fortress continued to pose a looming danger to the city with its artillery, so much so that even in the early 1860s the Bourbon military commander of the stronghold warned the population that he would bombard Messina at the first turmoil. The mayor of Messina, Baron Felice Silipigni, dared to protest these threats and was therefore removed from his post directly on the orders of King Francis II of Bourbon. The prison inside the Citadel, the penal colony of Santa Teresa, was infamous for its harshness, which led to the death of inmates. Some of the leading figures of the Sicilian Revolution died within the walls of this prison. For example, the priest Giovanni Krymi, among the leading exponents of the Messina revolt, was imprisoned by order of General Filangieri inside the prison of Santa Teresa, in which he ended up dying because of the appalling conditions of detention: "he was transported to the citadel of Messina, holed up by the military, who were ruling over the besieged city, in the colony of Santa Teresa, a terrible cave that rots the strongest temperament of man. There, from 1849 to 1854, he suffered torture and hunger worse than death: he died there." Francesco Bagnasco, brother of the more famous Rosario and author of the famous "defiance" placard (which appeared on the walls of Palermo on the morning of January 9 to invite the population to rise up for the 12th of the same month), was imprisoned in the Citadel of Messina in 1849 and perished there shortly afterwards, presumably as a result of poisoning. There were many Sicilians who ended up in the prisons of the fortress. For example, the Catanese patriot Pietro Marano wrote to Rosolino Pilo in December 1849: "The Neapolitan beast is raging more and more. On the 8th of this month, thirty-three honest citizens were arrested in Catania, and the same night they were taken to the citadel of Messina along with other political prisoners who were in the Catania prison".

The long and very harsh siege of Messina in 1848, with the enormous damage to the city and the heavy loss of life, also left a lasting mark on the collective memory, as was manifested in March 1861, when the remaining Bourbon units that still controlled the citadel surrendered to the Royal Army. At that time, the hatred of the population for the Neapolitan troops of the disbanded Bourbon Army became so evident that General Cialdini had a hard time holding back the Messinians, who wanted to destroy the fortress and massacre the prisoners. There was also an attempted lynching of the prisoners by a mob of Messinian citizens.

== See also ==
- Real Cittadella
- Sicilian revolution of 1848

== Bibliography ==
- “Archivio storico messinese. Atti della società storica messinese”, anno I, Messina 1900.
- “Archivio storico siciliano”, pubblicazione periodica della Società Siciliana per la Storia Patria, nuova serie, anno XXVI, Palermo 1901.
- Francesco Brancato (1963). "Bagnasco, Rosario". Dizionario Biografico degli Italiani (in Italian). Vol. 5: Bacca–Baratta. Rome: Istituto dell'Enciclopedia Italiana. OCLC 883370. rosario-bagnasco.
- M.Cannonero, "Un'idea senza fine. Così nacque la Croce Rossa: il Risorgimento italiano e oggi", Ed. Joker, 2014, www.edizionijoker.com
- A. Barbero, “I prigionieri dei Savoia. La vera storia della congiura di Fenestrelle”, Roma-Bari 2012.
- A. Berdar-C. La Fauci- F. Riccobono, La real cittadella di Messina, prefazione di R. Santoro, Messina, 1982.
- A. Bonifacio, Il monastero benedettino di S.Placido Calonerò e la sua biblioteca, in Archivio storico messinese, III Serie - Vol. XXV – XXVI, Anni 1975 -1976 - Vol. 34°dalla fondazione, a cura della Società Messinese di Storia Patria, Messina 1976.
- P. Calvi, Memorie storiche e critiche della rivoluzione siciliana del 1848, Londra, 1861.
- N. Checco-E. Consolo, Messina nei moti del 1847-1848, in Il Risorgimento: rivista di storia del Risorgimento e storia contemporanea, a. 51 (1999) n. 1.
- A. Caglià-Ferro, Monografia sui fatti del 1º settembre 1847 in Messina, Messina 1890.
- E. Casanova, Il Comitato centrale siciliano di Palermo (1849-1852), in «Rassegna storica del Risorgimento», anno XII, fascicolo II, 1925, pp. 310–311.
- S. Chiaramonte, “Il programma del '48 e i partiti politici in Sicilia”, in “Archivio storico siciliano”, n. 3., anno XXVI, 1901.
- G. Cingari, Gli ultimi Borboni: dalla Restaurazione all'Unità, in Storia della Sicilia, VIII, Napoli 1977.
- Gian Maria Varanini; Elena Sodini (2004). "La Masa, Giuseppe". Dizionario Biografico degli Italiani (in Italian). Vol. 63: Labroca–Laterza. Rome: Istituto dell'Enciclopedia Italiana. ISBN 978-88-12-00032-6. giuseppe-la-masa.
- C. Gemelli, “Storia della siciliana rivoluzione del 1848-49”, Bologna 1867.
- A. Elia, “Ricordi di un garibaldino dal 1847-48 al 1900”, vol. I, Roma 1904.
- F. Guardione, “Antonio Lanzetta e Rosa Donato nella rivoluzione del 1848 in Messina”, Messina 1893.
- F. Guardione, Giovanni Krymy, in «Rassegna storica del Risorgimento», anno II, fascicolo III, 1915, p. 619.
- Giovanni Krymi (1 May 1848). "Sfida di Giovanni Krymi al generale del re bombardatore generale Pronio" (jpg).
- G. Falzone, Il problema della Sicilia nel 1848 attraverso nuove fonti inedite, Palermo, 1951.
- Filangieri Fieschi Ravaschieri, Il generale Carlo Filangieri, Milano, 1902.
- A. Frediani, "101 battaglie che hanno fatto l'Italia Unita", Roma, Newton Compton Editori 2011.
- G. La Farina, Storia della rivoluzione siciliana e delle sue relazioni coi governi italiani e stranieri. 1848-1849, Milano 1860.
- G. La Masa (a cura di), Documenti della rivoluzione siciliana del 1847-1849 in rapporto all'Italia illustrati da G. La Masa, Torino 1850.
- Francesca Maria Lo Faro (2004). "Krymi, Giovanni". Dizionario Biografico degli Italiani (in Italian). Vol. 62: Iacobiti–Labriola. Rome: Istituto dell'Enciclopedia Italiana. ISBN 978-88-12-00032-6. giovanni-krymi.
- C. Naselli, Il Quarantotto a Catania: la preparazione, gli avvenimenti, in «Archivio Storico per la Sicilia orientale», serie IV, a. II e III, 1949-1950.
- Notiziario delle cose avvenute l'anno 1848 nella guerra siciliana, a cura di F. Azzolino, Napoli 1848
- G. Oliva. Annali della città di Messina.Continuazione all'opera di C. D. Gallo ....Messina. 1892-1954.
- P. Pieri, Storia militare del Risorgimento, Torino 1962.
- L. Riall, La Sicilia e l'unificazione italiana. Politica liberale e potere locale (1815-1866), Torino 2004.
- R. Romeo, Il Risorgimento in Sicilia, Bari 1950.
- R. Santoro, Storia dei precipui rivolgimenti politici accaduti nel regno delle Due Sicilie nel 1848-1849, Napoli 1850.
- R. Stracuzzi, “Il tabulario di S. Maria dell'Alto di Messina (1245-1718)”, in “Archivio storico messinese”, vol. 89°-90° dalla fondazione.
- L. Tomeucci, Le cinque giornate di Messina nel'48, Ferrara, Messina, 1953.
- L. Tomeucci, Messina nel Risorgimento, Milano 1963.
- L.Tomeucci, La verità sul moto del 1º settembre 1847, in Messana, Messina 1953.
