= Filippo Foderà =

Italian lawyer

Filippo Foderà (9 September 1789 – 5 July 1837) was an Italian lawyer who advocated for reform of the legal system in his native Sicily.

Filippo was born in Girgenti to an agricultural family of modest means. He was initially educated at the Bishop's Seminary in his native town, leading to university studies in Palermo, where he received a broad education. He ultimately specialized in law. He recognized the legal codes in Sicily were an accumulation of statutes from many foreign ruling societies, from Romans to Normans to Spaniards and Austrians. This created an intricate but confusing code that needed urgent refurbishment in this period of advancing Jacobin's ideas. Filippo was elected a representative in the Sicilian parliament, representing Girgenti. Since the kingdom remained bereft of a constitution until the overthrow of the Bourbon monarchy, it needs to be clarified how much progress was made in reforms. His major opus was a multivolume work on Principi della legislazione criminale e della riforma dei codici criminali which made use of comparing legal systems from other country. He published a text on musical theory and some poetry late in life. He died in Girgenti during the cholera epidemic of 1837.
