= Real Cittadella =

Fort in Messina, Sicily

- Part of the fortifications of Messina
- Messina, Sicily, Italy
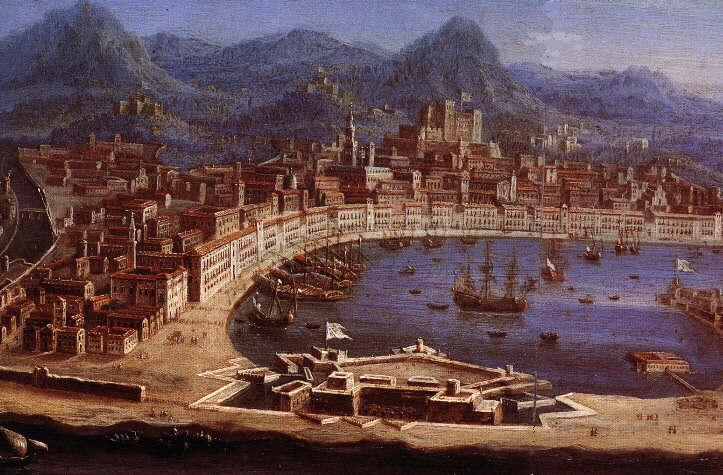
- View of Messina before the earthquake of 1783, with the Cittadella in the foreground

Site information
- Type: bastion fort
- Condition: Two bastions, some curtain walls and outworks intact

Location
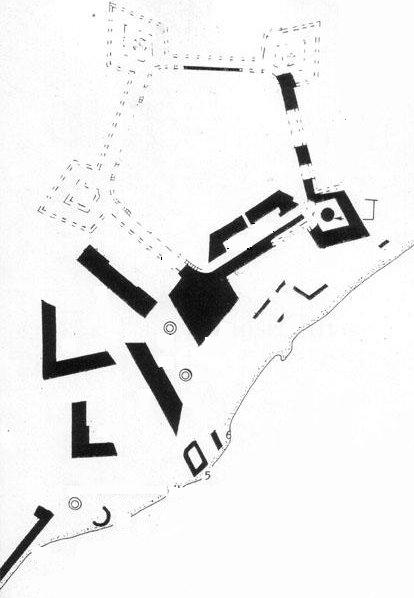
- Map of the Cittadella, with the surviving parts in black
- Coordinates: 38°11′16″N 15°34′0.6″E

Site history
- Built: 1680–1686
- Built by: Spanish Empire
- In use: 1680s–20th century
- Materials: Limestone
- Fate: Partially demolished
- Battles/wars: War of the Quadruple Alliance; War of the Polish Succession; Sicilian revolution of 1848; Expedition of the Thousand; World War II

The Real Cittadella was a fort in Messina, Sicily, southern Italy. The Cittadella was built between 1680 and 1686 by the Spanish Empire, and it was considered to be one of the most important fortifications in the Mediterranean. Most of the fort was demolished in the 20th century, but some parts can still be seen.

== History ==
=== Background and construction ===
The Real Cittadella was built by the Spanish Empire (who controlled the Kingdom of Sicily) between 1680 and 1686. It was built to defend the port of Messina, but it was also meant to establish a strong garrison in the city to prevent the population from revolting, as had happened a few years earlier in 1674.

The fort was designed by Carlos de Grunenbergh, the military engineer of the Viceroy of Sicily. It was built in the centre of the peninsula of San Raineri, and was cut off from the mainland by a moat. The extremity of the peninsula was occupied by the Forte del Santissimo Salvatore.

A neighborhood populated by 8000 people, a Benedictine monastery and several churches had to be demolished to make way for the construction of the Cittadella.

=== 18th and 19th centuries ===
The Spanish lost control of Sicily to the House of Savoy in 1713. In 1718, they invaded the island during the War of the Quadruple Alliance, and the Cittadella surrendered to the Spanish general Spinola. A year later it was recaptured by the Austrian Count Claude Florimond de Mercy. The Cittadella was again captured by the Bourbon Charles III of Spain in 1735, during the War of the Polish Succession.

The fort was also used as a prison, and the French geologist Déodat Gratet de Dolomieu was imprisoned there in 1798.

During the Sicilian revolution of 1848, the rebels did not capture the Cittadella, although they succeeded in taking over Forte Gonzaga and a number of other fortifications in the city. The rebels bombarded the Cittadella, but Bourbon troops held out until a relief force arrived in September 1849 and crushed the rebellion.

The Cittadella was again heavily bombarded by the Piedmontese army during the Expedition of the Thousand in 1860. It was the last stronghold of the Kingdom of the Two Sicilies on the island, and its garrison surrendered on 13 March 1861.

Following the capture of the fort, the people of Messina demanded its demolition, but the new government saw its importance and the damage sustained in the sieges of 1848-49 and 1860-61 was repaired. The fort remained an active military installation until the earthquake of 1908, when it was converted into a warehouse.

=== Partial demolition ===
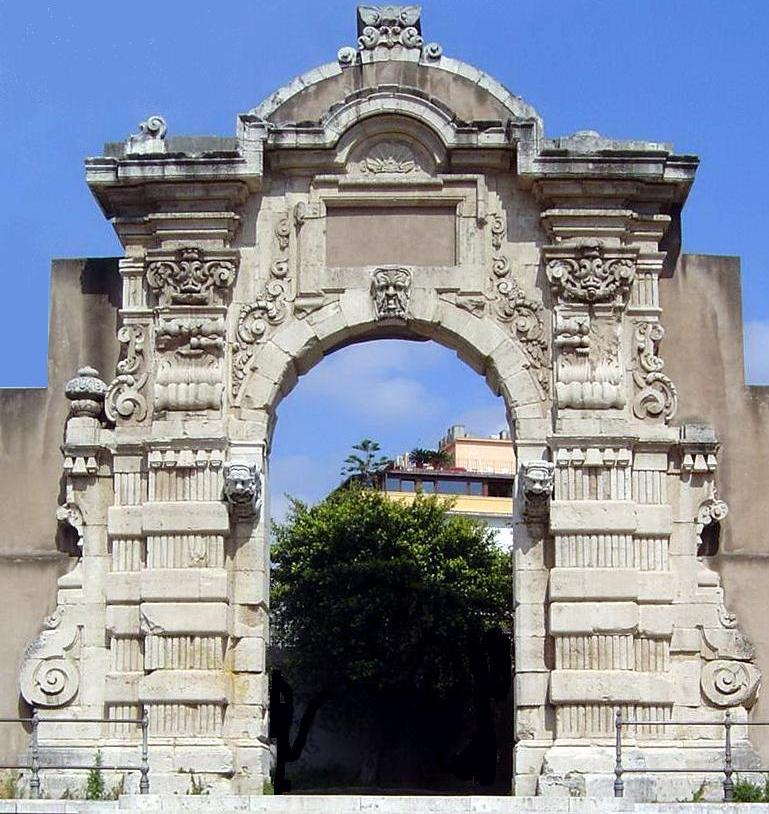
Porta Grazia, now relocated to Piazza Casa Pia dei Poveri

In the 1920s, Norimberga, San Francesco and San Carlo Bastions were demolished following the opening of a new road. The remaining parts of the fort were occupied by the military once again during World War II, and the structure was damaged by aerial bombardment. After the war, the area was industrialized.

Porta Grazia, the fort's main gate, was relocated to Piazza Casa Pia dei Poveri in 1961.

=== Present day ===
Today, San Stefano and San Diego Bastions, the adjoining curtain walls and some of the outworks remain intact. The foundations of the demolished bastions still exist underground, and are worthy of preservation.

The remaining parts of the Cittadella are neglected, and sometimes waste is illegally dumped in the fort.

== Layout ==
The Real Cittadella was a pentagonal star fort, and was typical example of 17th century military architecture. It had five corner bastions (named Norimberga, San Francesco, San Carlo, San Stefano and San Diego), which were linked by curtain walls. A cavalier was located on each bastion.

In addition, the fort had a number of outworks, including a ravelin, lunettes, counterguards and faussebrayes.
