= Forte Castellaccio (Messina) =

Fort in Messina, Italy

- Part of the fortifications of Messina
- Messina, Sicily, Italy
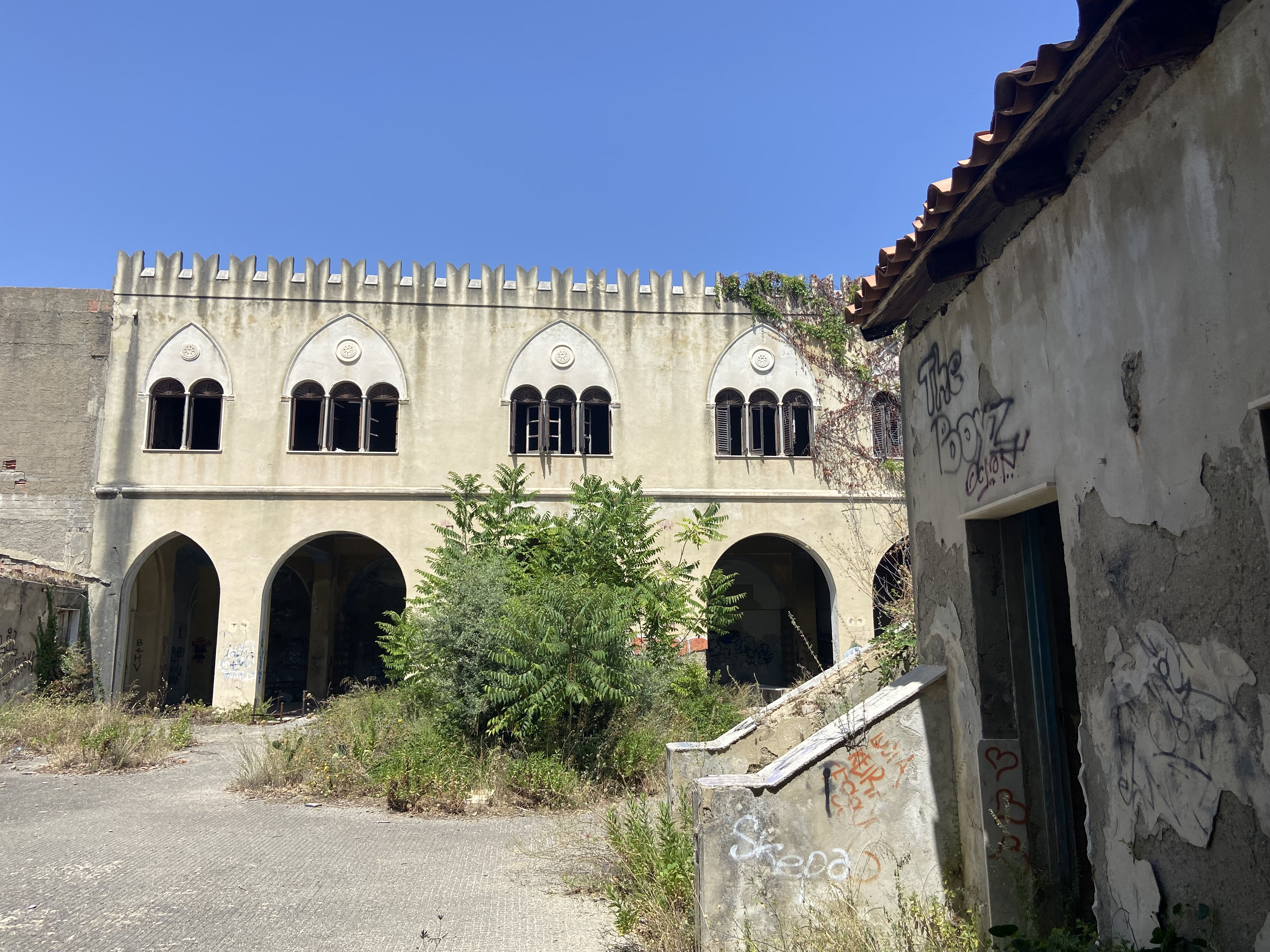
- View of Forte Castellaccio

Site information
- Condition: Derelict

Location
- Coordinates: 38°11′46.046″N 15°32′26.909″E

Site history
- Built: c. 1547
- Built by: Kingdom of Sicily
- Materials: Limestone

Forte Castellaccio is an abandoned hilltop fortress in Messina, Sicily built by Juan de Vega, Viceroy of Sicily around the middle of the 16th Century as part of a defensive project ordered by Emperor Charles V of Habsburg. It was designed by the Italian military architect Antonio Ferramolino (died. 1550). It was damaged by the 1908 Messina earthquake before being briefly reused as a 'colony for boys' in the 1940s. Despite several attempts to renovate the site since, it has remained abandoned and considered locally to be haunted by the ghosts of orphans and by the apparition of a nun.

== Description ==
The fortress stands on a hill between Gravitelli and Montepiselli, a short distance from Forte Gonzaga, another 16th Century defensive structure also built by Juan de Vega and designed by Antonio Ferramolino. The original structure has a quadrangular design and is annexed by several more modern buildings, all now in a state of dereliction.

== Images ==
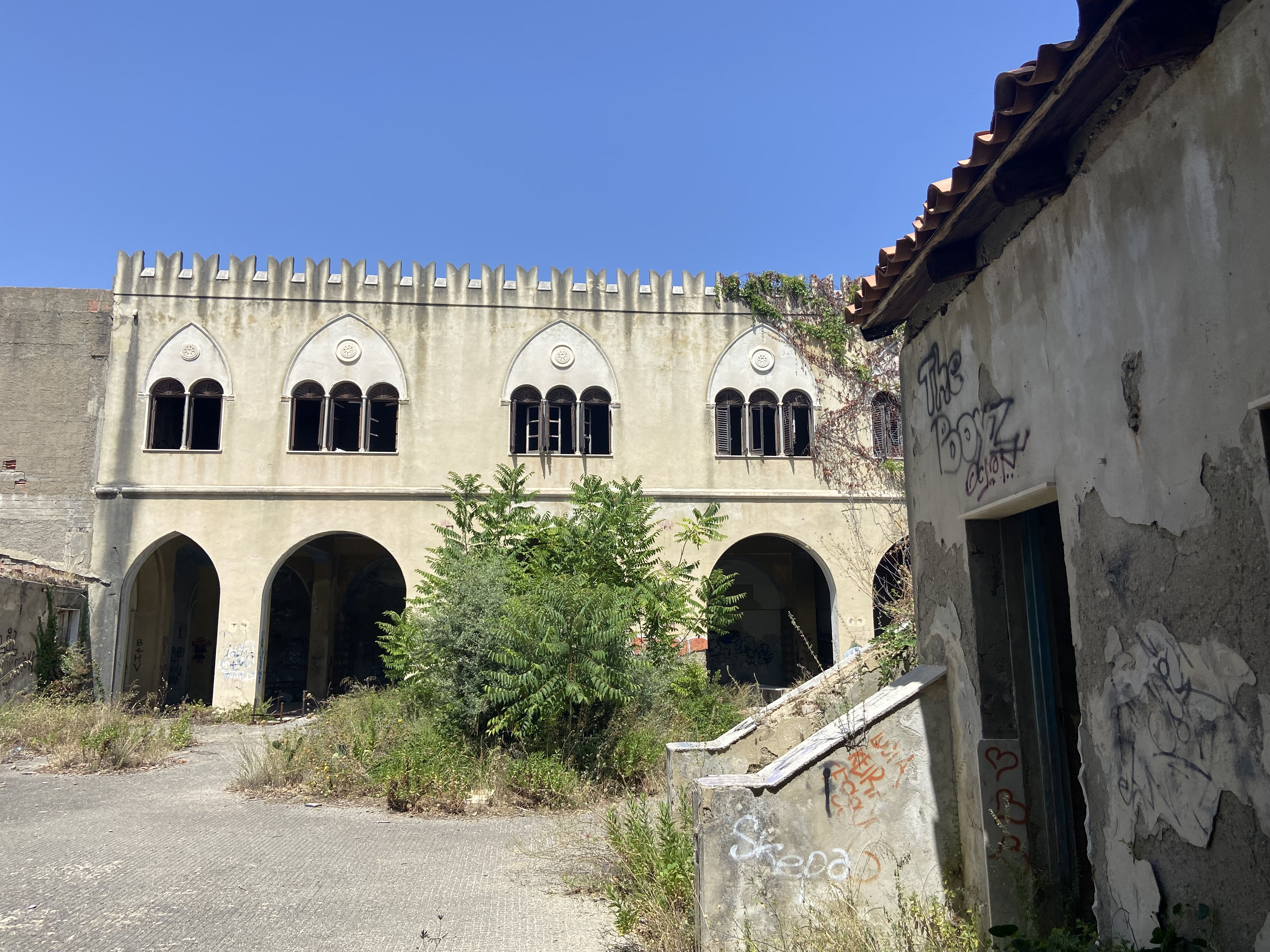
Abandoned Forte Castellaccio

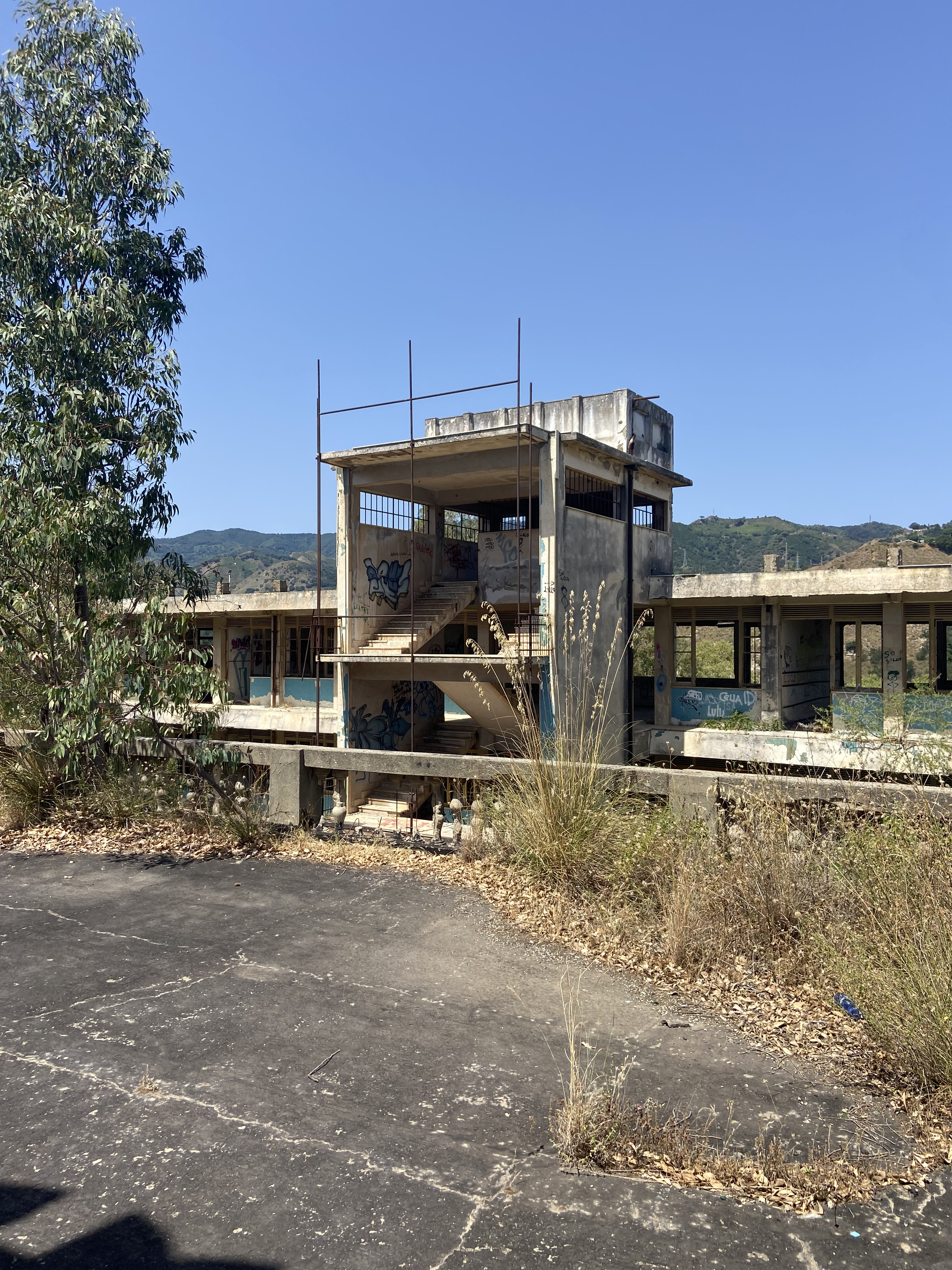
Derelict building annexed to Forte Castellaccio
