= Fortifications of Messina =

- Fortificazioni di Messina
- Messina, Sicily, Italy

Site information
- Type: City wall

Location
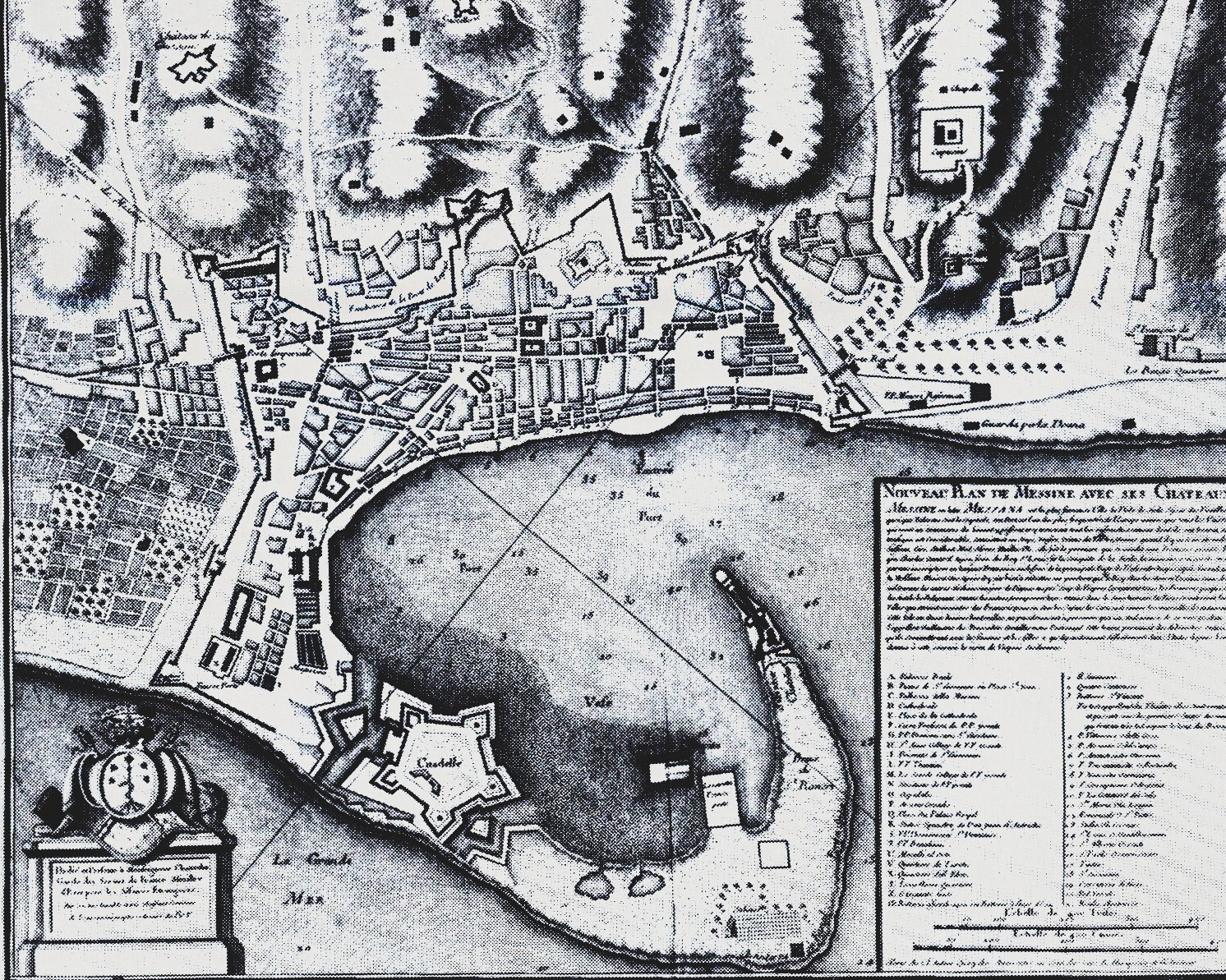
- 18th century map of Messina showing the fortifications
- Coordinates: 38°11′51.1″N 15°33′58″E

Site history
- Built: c. 1200–1686
- Built by: Kingdom of Sicily/Spanish Empire
- In use: c. 1200–1850s
- Battles/wars: War of the Quadruple Alliance; War of the Polish Succession; Sicilian revolution of 1848; Expedition of the Thousand
- Events: Earthquake of 1783; Earthquake of 1908

The fortifications of Messina were a series of defensive walls and other fortifications which surrounded the city of Messina, Sicily. The first walls were built during the Middle Ages in around 1200. A system of bastioned fortifications was constructed around the city in the 1530s and 1540s. The fortifications were modified over the years, with the last major addition being the Real Cittadella, which was built in the 1680s. Most of the walls were demolished in the 19th and 20th centuries, but some parts of the walls still survive today.

== History ==
=== Medieval walls ===
The first walls around Messina were built in around 1200.

=== Bastioned fortifications ===
In 1535, Emperor Charles V (who was also King of Sicily) ordered the strengthening of Messina's fortifications. A new defensive system of bastioned fortifications was built between 1536 and 1538, to a design of the military engineers Antonio Ferramolino and Francesco Maurolico. In the 1540s, a number of forts were built strengthening the walls:

- Forte Gonzaga, to control the mountains to the west of the city
- Castellaccio, to control the hillside of the city
- Forte del Santissimo Salvatore, to control the entrance to the harbour

In the 1680s, the Real Cittadella was built, and it was intended for both coastal defence and to establish a strong garrison in the city to prevent the population from revolting.

The city of Messina and its fortifications changed hands a number of times in the first half of the 18th century during the War of the Quadruple Alliance and the War of the Polish Succession.

During the Sicilian revolution of 1848, rebels managed to capture most of the fortifications, with the exception of the Real Cittadella and Forte del Santissimo Salvatore. The forts' defenders bombarded the city until a relief force crushed the revolution in 1849.

=== Demolition and recent history ===
The fortifications remained in active use until the 1850s, when the government of the Kingdom of the Two Sicilies began dismantling some of the walls, including the city's main gates. Despite this, the Real Cittadella and some other forts remained in use, and saw action during Garibaldi's Expedition of the Thousand in 1860–61, when they capitulated to Piedmontese forces after a siege.

After the earthquake of 1908, parts of Forte del Santissimo Salvatore were demolished. Most of the Real Cittadella was also demolished in the 1920s.
