= Forte del Santissimo Salvatore =

Fort in Messina, Sicily

- Part of the fortifications of Messina
- Messina, Sicily, Italy
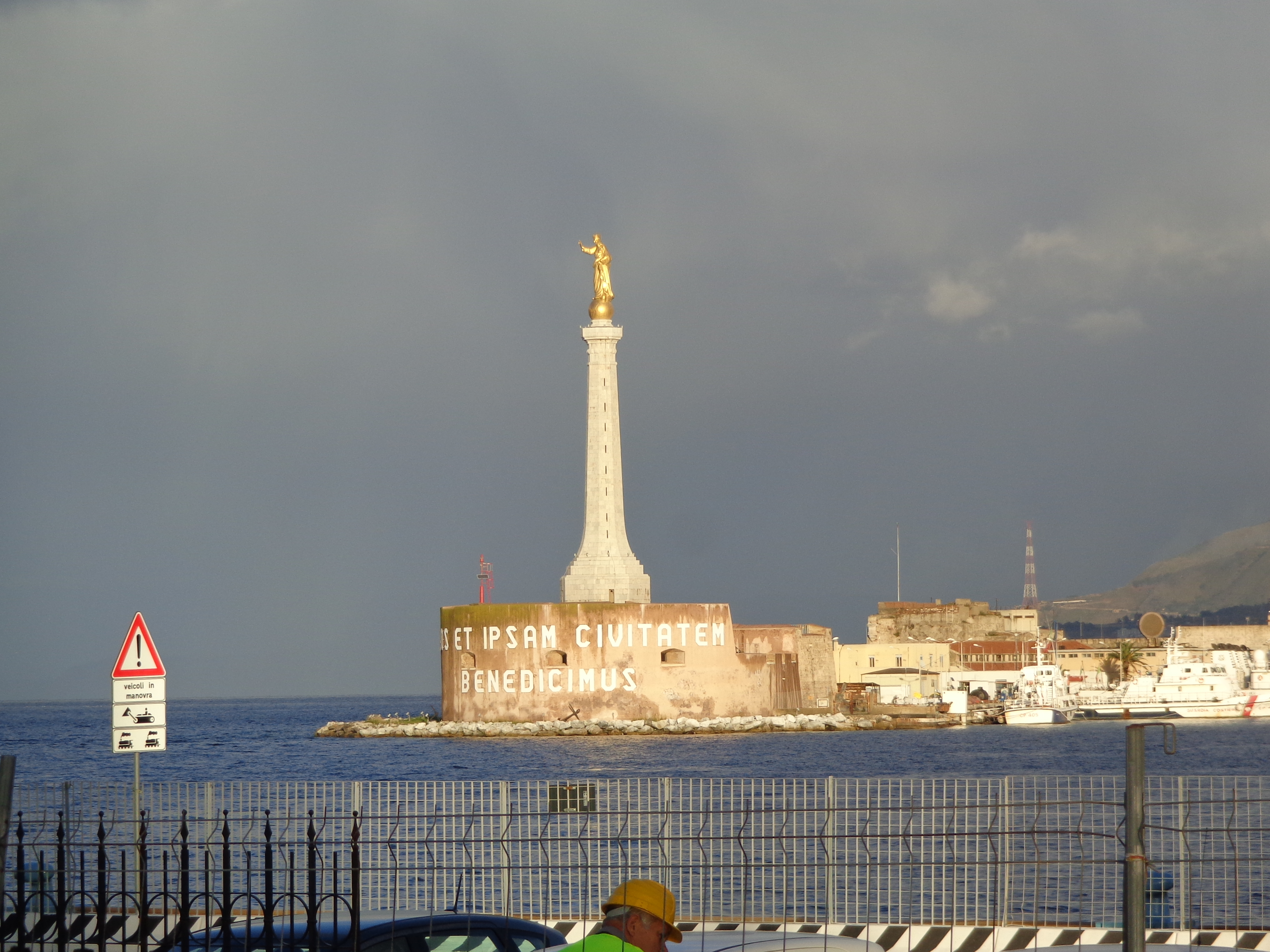
- View the Madonna della Lettera and the fort

Site information
- Type: Fort
- Condition: Partially intact

Location
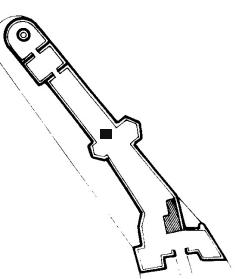
- Plan of the fort
- Coordinates: 38°11′47.7″N 15°33′46.8″E

Site history
- Built: 1537–1546
- Built by: Kingdom of Sicily
- Materials: Limestone and brick
- Battles/wars: Sicilian revolution of 1848; Expedition of the Thousand
- Events: Earthquake of 1783; Earthquake of 1908

Forte del Santissimo Salvatore, also known as Castello del Santissimo Salvatore, is a fort in Messina, Sicily, southern Italy. It was built in the mid-16th century, and it is still military property. Some of its walls were demolished after the earthquake of 1908, but the rest of the fort is still intact.

== History ==
The peninsula of San Raineri, on which Forte del Santissimo Salvatore was eventually built, had been inhabited since antiquity, and Greek pottery dating back to the 8th century BC was found at the site. The fort got its name from a monastery and church dedicated to the Holy Saviour, which were built on the peninsula in the Middle Ages. In around 1081, a tower dedicated to Saint Anne was built on the peninsula, and it saw action during the War of the Sicilian Vespers in 1282.

In the 1540s, the fortifications of Messina were being modernized due to fears of the expanding Ottoman Empire. The monastery and other medieval buildings were demolished to make way for Forte del Santissimo Salvatore, but the church and tower were retained and incorporated into the new fort. The fort was completed in 1546 to a design by Antonio Ferramolino, a military engineer from Bergamo. In 1549, the fort's gunpowder magazine blew up, destroying the church in the process.

The fort was captured by local rebels during the 1674 uprising against Spanish rule. After the revolt was suppressed in 1678, the Real Cittadella was built in the centre of the San Ranieri peninsula, close to Forte del Santissimo Salvatore. The fort was damaged during the earthquake of 1783, but was repaired soon afterwards.

During the Sicilian revolution of 1848, the fort and the nearby Cittadella remained in Bourbon hands, and was used to bombarded the city of Messina, which had been captured by rebels. It was eventually captured by Piedmontese forces during the Expedition of the Thousand in 1861.

The fort was again severely damaged in the earthquake of 1908. The walls facing the port of Messina had to be demolished a year later.

In 1934, a large statue of Saint Mary, known as the Madonna della Lettera was erected in the fort, on the site of the medieval tower of St. Anne.

Some restoration work has been carried out at the fort. It is still military property, being located near the Italian Coast Guard's base in Messina.

== Layout ==
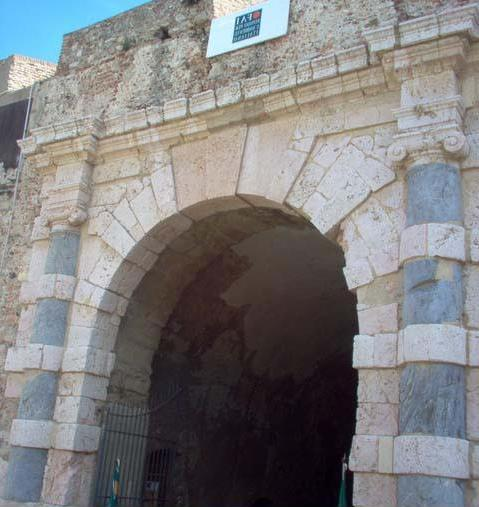
The fort's main gate

The fort has a polygonal shape running along the natural shape of the peninsula. The extremity is occupied by a semi-circular bastion known as Forte Campana. The medieval tower of St. Anne was incorporated into the bastion, and its remains can still be seen.

The fort's land front originally consisted of two bastions linked together by a curtain wall containing the main gate. One of the bastions is still intact, but the other one was demolished after it sustained damage in the earthquake of 1908.

The land front was linked to the semi-circular bastion by two curtain walls, each containing artillery batteries and a small bastion. The wall facing the Strait of Messina is still intact, but the one facing the harbour was demolished after the earthquake.
