= Vincenzo Fardella di Torrearsa =

Italian politician

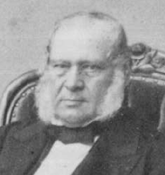

8th President of the Senate
- In office 1 December 1870 – 20 September 1874
- Preceded by: Gabrio Casati
- Succeeded by: Luigi Des Ambrois

Personal details
- Born: 16 July 1808 Trapani, Kingdom of Sicily
- Died: 12 January 1889 (aged 80) Palermo, Kingdom of Italy
- Party: Moderate Party (1848–1861); Historical Right (1861–1873)
- Profession: Politician

Vincenzo Fardella di Torrearsa (16 July 1808 – 12 January 1889) was an Italian statesman who served as President of the Senate from 1 December 1870 to 20 September 1874.

== Life ==
Born in Trapani, was Count and Marquis of Torrearsa. He was a protagonist of the Italian Risorgimento. In Sicilian revolution of 1848 was president of Sicilian Parliament. Fardella was then in exile in Turin, London and Nice.

In 1860 following the expedition of Giuseppe Garibaldi's Mille was minister in the Dictatorship of Garibaldi. In 1861 he was elected Member of Italian Chamber of Deputies and soon after appointed Senator of the Kingdom.

In 1870, after the capture of Rome, he was elected president of the Senate of Italy, the first in Palazzo Madama, until 1874.
