= Forte Gonzaga =

Fort in Messina, Italy

- Part of the fortifications of Messina
- Messina, Sicily, Italy
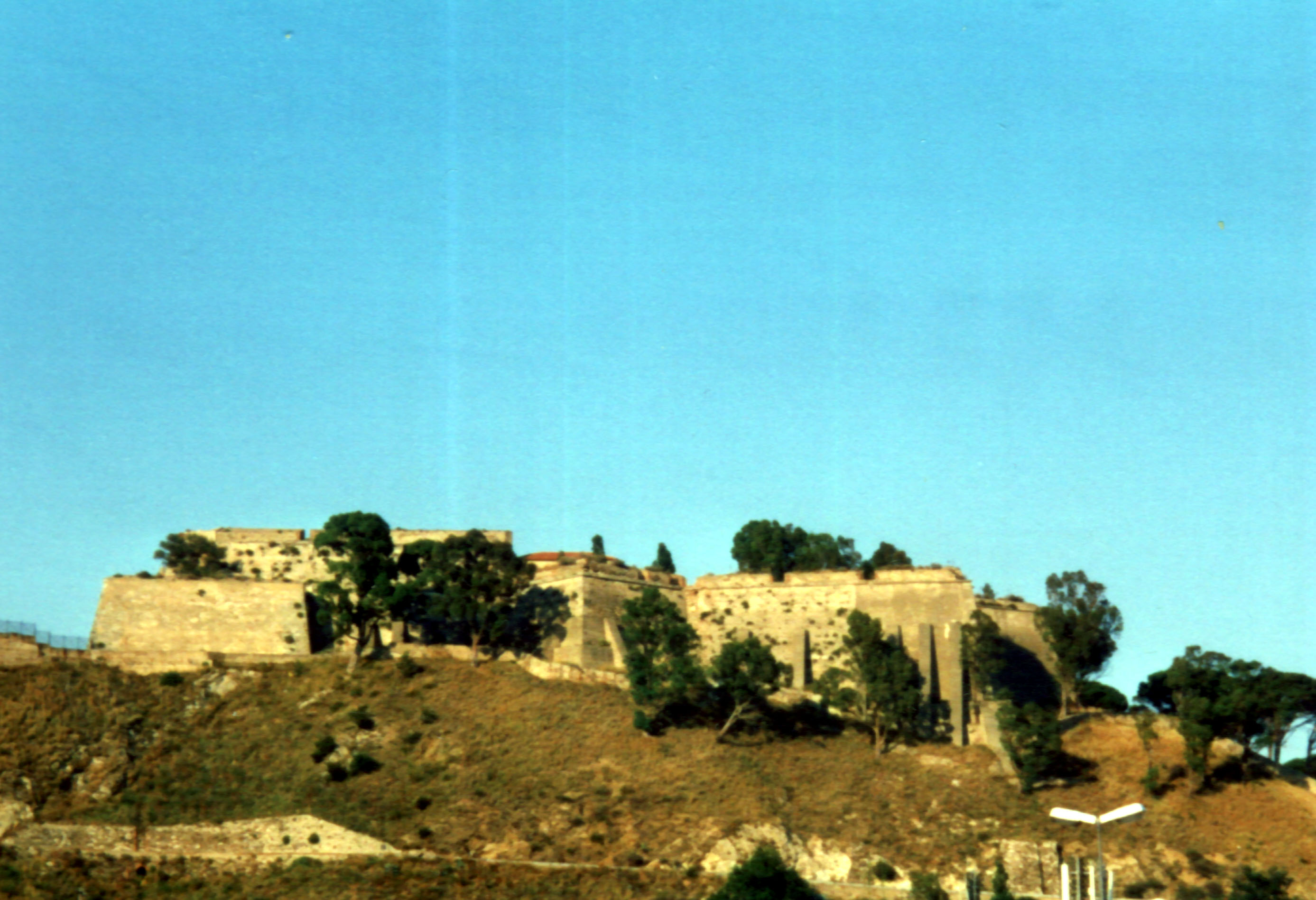
- View of Forte Gonzaga

Site information
- Condition: Intact

Location
- Coordinates: 38°11′17.2″N 15°32′27″E

Site history
- Built: c. 1540–1545
- Built by: Kingdom of Sicily
- In use: 1545–1973
- Materials: Limestone
- Battles/wars: War of the Quadruple Alliance; Sicilian revolution of 1848; World War II

Forte Gonzaga, also known as Castel Gonzaga, is a bastioned fort in Messina, Sicily. It was built in the mid-16th century, and it remained in use by the military until 1973. Today, the fort is in good condition.

== History ==
In the 1540s, the fortifications of Messina were being modernized due to fears of the expanding Ottoman Empire. Forte Gonzaga was built on the hill of Montepiselli, outside the city walls. It was able to defend the mountainous landward approach to the city, and it also overlooked the Strait of Messina. The fort was designed by Antonio Ferramolino, a military engineer from Bergamo. He was assisted by Francesco Maurolico, a native of Messina. It was named after the Viceroy of Sicily Don Ferrante Gonzaga, and was completed in 1545.

The Ottoman threat was reduced after the Catholic victory in the Battle of Lepanto in 1571, and the fort's importance began to decline. It saw use during the 1674–78 uprising against Spanish rule. Spain eventually lost Sicily in 1713, but invaded the island five years later during the War of the Quadruple Alliance. During the invasion, the fort did not offer much resistance and was captured by the Spanish general Luca Spinola.

During the Sicilian revolution of 1848, the fort was captured by rebels, who used it to bombard the Real Cittadella which was still in Bourbon hands.

Forte Gonzaga saw use in World War II when it was used by German and Italian forces prior to the Allied invasion, and it was subsequently used by American forward observers to direct artillery fire during the invasion of Italy. It remained a military establishment until 1973, when the Italian Army handed it to the municipality of Messina. There are plans to restore the fort and turn it into a museum and conference centre.

== Layout ==
The fort has an irregular star shape with a number of bastions. The entire structure is surrounded by a moat. A small chapel is located on the fort's terrace.
