= Antonio Ferramolino =

Italian architect and military engineer

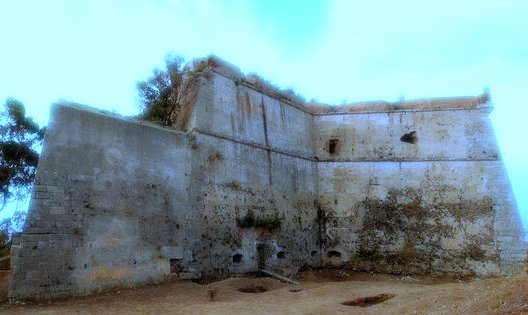
Forte Gonzaga in Messina, which was designed by Ferramolino in 1540

Antonio Ferramolino was a 16th-century Italian architect and military engineer. He is also known as Sferrandino da Bergamo, and is called Hernan Molin in Spanish sources. He is mostly known for his work in Sicily, but he also designed fortifications in Ragusa and Malta.

== Life ==
Ferramolino was born in Bergamo, which was then part of the Republic of Venice. He began his career as a soldier, but little is known about his early works. In 1529 he oversaw the construction of artillery at the Venetian Arsenal.

In 1532, he fought for Ferdinand of Habsburg against the Ottomans in the Little War in Hungary. The following year he was hired by Holy Roman Emperor Charles V and sent to Coron, which had been conquered by admiral Andrea Doria. Ferramolino worked in the local defenses and was recalled before the place was sieged again by the Ottomans.

Ferramolino was also present at the conquest of Tunis in 1535. In 1536, Charles V sent him to review the fortifications of Messina and the rest of Sicily. Over the next couple of years, he designed several fortifications around Sicily, including at Messina, Palermo and Catania.

In 1538, Ferramolino went to the Republic of Ragusa (modern Dubrovnik, Croatia) and designed the Revelin Fortress.

In 1540, he was sent to Malta, which was ruled by the Order of Saint John. He designed the cavalier and ditch of Fort St. Angelo, and designed two bastions of the fortifications of Mdina. He also proposed the construction of a fort on the Sciberras Peninsula.

Ferramolino was killed on 18 August 1550 during the siege of Mahdia in modern Tunisia.

== Works ==
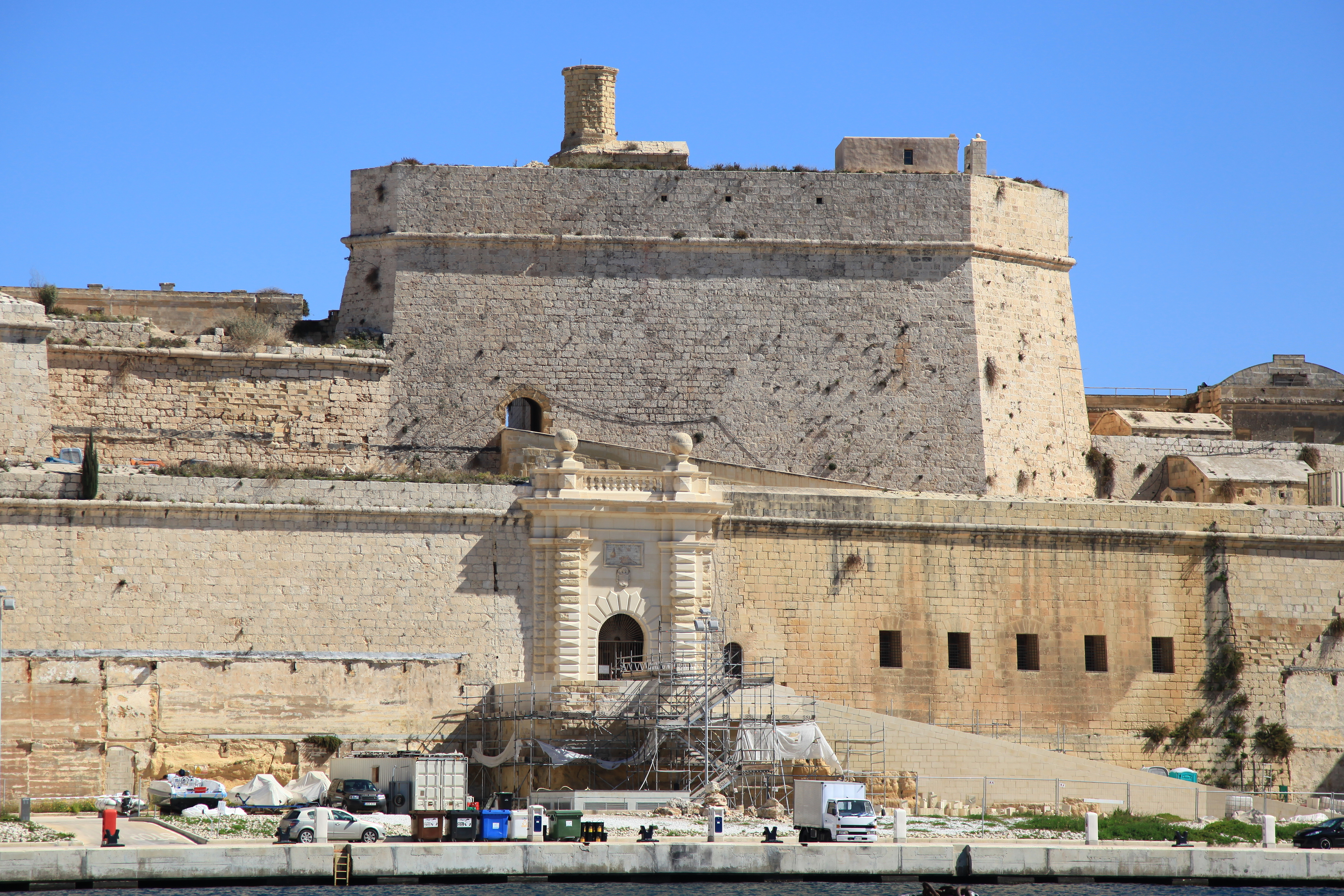
The cavalier of Fort St. Angelo in Birgu, Malta, which was designed by Ferramolino

Ferramolino designed or modified the following fortifications, among others:

- Forte Gonzaga, Messina, Sicily
- Forte Castellaccio, Messina, Sicily
- Forte del Santissimo Salvatore, Messina, Sicily
- Castello Matagrifone, Messina, Sicily
- Fortifications of Palermo, Sicily
- Fortifications of Catania, Sicily
- Castello di Milazzo, Milazzo, Sicily
- Revelin Fortress, Dubrovnik, Croatia
- Modifications to the fortifications of Mdina, Malta
- Cavalier and ditch of Fort St. Angelo, Birgu, Malta
