= Sicilian revolution of 1848 =

Rebellion against Bourbon rule in the Kingdom of Sicily

- Part of Revolutions of 1848 in the Italian states
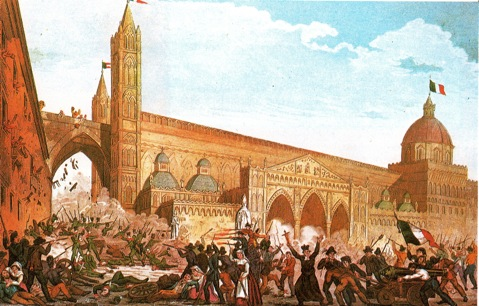
- The revolution in Palermo (12 January 1848)
Date	12 January 1848 – 15 May 1849
Location	Sicily, Kingdom of Two Sicilies
Result	Revolution suppressed; more powers to the Sicilian local administration

Belligerents
Sicilian rebels	Two Sicilies

Commanders and leaders
Ruggero Settimo; V. Fardella di Torrearsa; Francesco Crispi; Ludwik Mierosławski	Ferdinand II; Carlo Filangieri

Units involved
Sicilian rebels	Army of the Two Sicilies

Strength
c. 20,000	Unknown

Casualties and losses
Unknown	

The Sicilian revolution of 1848 was the first of the numerous Revolutions of 1848 which swept across Europe. It was a popular rebellion against the rule of Ferdinand II of the House of Bourbon, King of the Two Sicilies. Three revolutions against the Bourbon ruled Kingdom of the Two Sicilies had previously occurred on the island of Sicily starting from 1800: this final one, which commenced on 12 January 1848, resulted in an independent state (the self-proclaimed Kingdom of Sicily) which survived for 16 months. The Sicilian Constitution of 1848 which survived the 16 months was advanced for its time in liberal democratic terms, as was the proposal of a unified Italian confederation of states. It was in effect a curtain-raiser to the end of the Bourbon kingdom of the Two Sicilies, finally completed by Giuseppe Garibaldi's Expedition of the Thousand in 1860, the Siege of Gaeta of 1860–1861 and the proclamation of the unified Kingdom of Italy.

== The revolution ==
=== Background ===
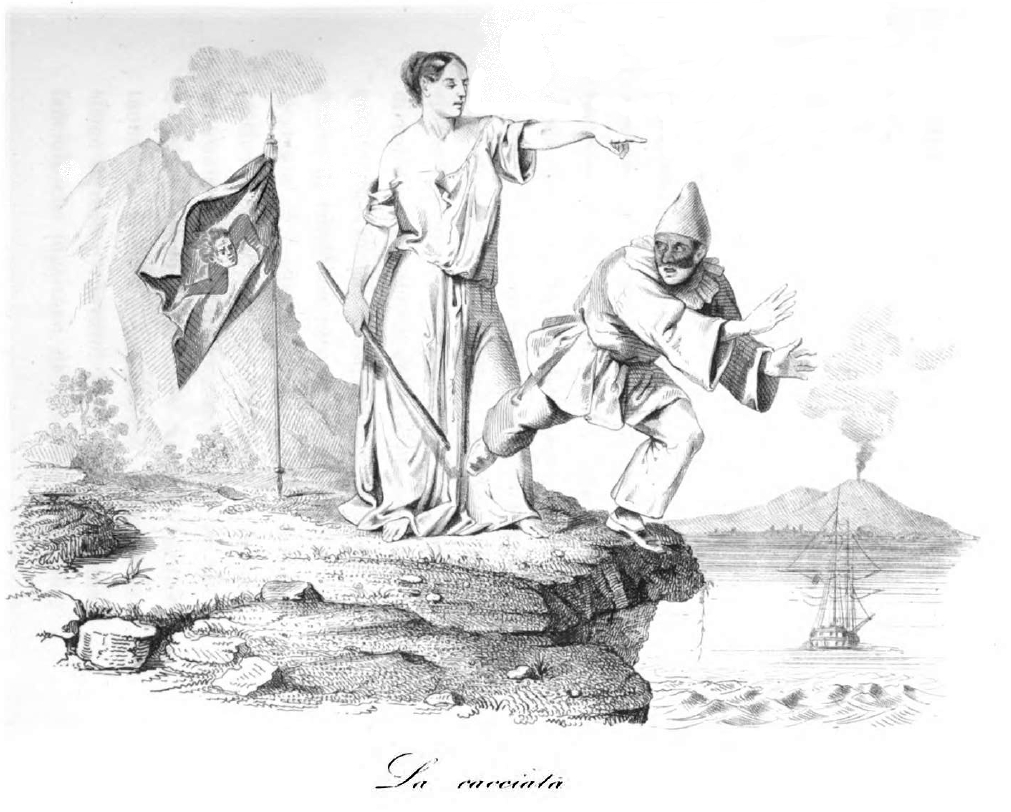
Allegorical print of the time depicting the expulsion of Neapolitan troops (represented by Pulcinella) from Sicily at the beginning of the revolt

The former kingdoms of Naples and Sicily were formally united following the 1815 Congress of Vienna to become the Bourbon Kingdom of the Two Sicilies. Both geographic areas had previously formed the single Kingdom of Sicily created by the Normans in the 11th century, but split in two following the War of the Sicilian Vespers in 1302.

The seeds of the revolution of 1848 were sown prior to the final defeat of Napoleon and the Congress of Vienna. This was during the tumultuous period during which in 1798 the Bourbon royal court was forced by Napoleonic troops to flee from Naples and to re-establish itself in Palermo in Sicily, with the assistance of the British navy under Admiral Nelson. The Sicilian nobles took the opportunity to force on the Bourbons a new constitution for Sicily. However, after the Congress of Vienna in 1815, Ferdinand IV of Naples (and III of Sicily) immediately abolished the constitution upon returning the royal court to Naples.

The hostility of the Sicilians towards Bourbon rule was due to many reasons, which included the suppression of all forms of autonomy of the Sicilian people and the dominance of Neapolitan elements, the poverty of the island, the harsh police regime and violations of the commitments made by the governments of Naples. These feelings were exacerbated in 1837 by a serious cholera epidemic which caused almost 70,000 deaths in Sicily and which increased the feelings of mistrust towards the royal government, accused of having voluntarily spread the pestilence by polluting water and air. Social tension erupted in a popular uprising that broke out in Syracuse and Catania.

=== Political events after the revolution ===
Flag used by Sicilians during the revolution

The 1848 revolution was substantially organized from, and centered in, Palermo. The popular nature of the revolt is evident in the fact that posters and notices were being handed out a full three days before the substantive acts of the revolution occurred on 12 January 1848. The timing was deliberately planned to coincide with the birthday of Ferdinand II of the Two Sicilies, himself born in Palermo in 1810 (during the Napoleonic period mentioned above).

The Italian tricolour was a symbol of the revolutions of 1848. The Provisional Government of Sicily, which then gave rise to the self-proclaimed Kingdom of Sicily, which lasted from 12 January 1848 to 15 May 1849 during the Sicilian revolution, adopted the Italian tricolour as flag, defaced with the trinacria, or triskelion. The Sicilian insurgents used to sing, in Sicilian language, the popular song Lu dudici jnnaru 1848 (en. "The 12 January 1848"): [...] January 12th, day of valour, unfurl the tricolour, freedom, freedom. [...].

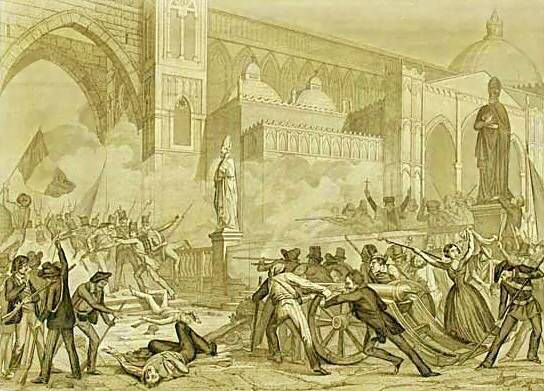
The Sicilian revolution of 1848, which was characterised by a wide use of the Italian tricolour. Fighting outside Palermo Cathedral

The Sicilian nobles were immediately able to resuscitate the constitution of 1812, which included the principles of representative democracy and the centrality of Parliament in the government of the state. Vincenzo Fardella was elected president of Sicilian Parliament. The idea was also put forward for a confederation of all the states of Italy. However the Sicilian Parliament was never able to control the well fortified city of Messina, which ultimately would be used to take back the island by force. Similarly, it was the city of Messina that held out the longest against Garibaldi’s attack on the island in 1860.

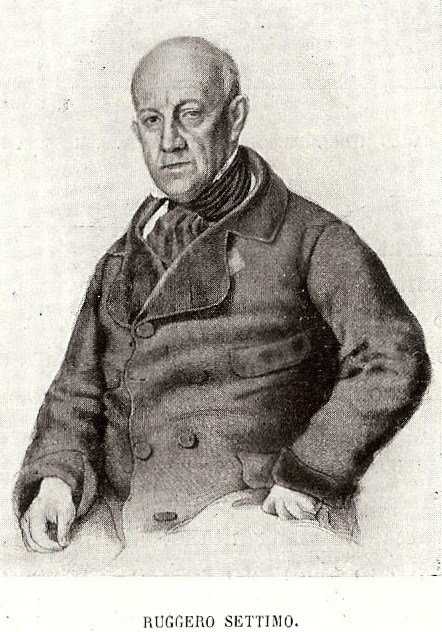
Ruggero Settimo

Thus, Sicily survived as a quasi-independent state for 16 months, with the Bourbon army taking back full control of the island on 15 May 1849 by force. The effective head of state during this period was Ruggero Settimo. On capitulating to the Bourbons, Settimo escaped to Malta where he was received with the full honours of a head of state, and remained exiled there for twelve years. Upon the formation of the new Kingdom of Italy in 1861, Settimo was offered the position of first President of the Senate of the newly created national parliament, and remained in that office until his death in 1863.

The Revolution which began in Palermo was one of a series of such events in Italy, though perhaps more violent than others. It quickly spread across the island and throughout Italy, where it prompted Charles Albert, King of Sardinia, to follow the example of Ferdinand II and issue a written constitution, the Albertine Statute (the Albertine Statute later became the constitution of the unified Kingdom of Italy and remained in force, with changes, until 1948). In imitation of these events, riots and revolutions followed around Europe at the same time, and may be considered a taste of the socialist revolts to come.

=== Violence towards Sicilians ===
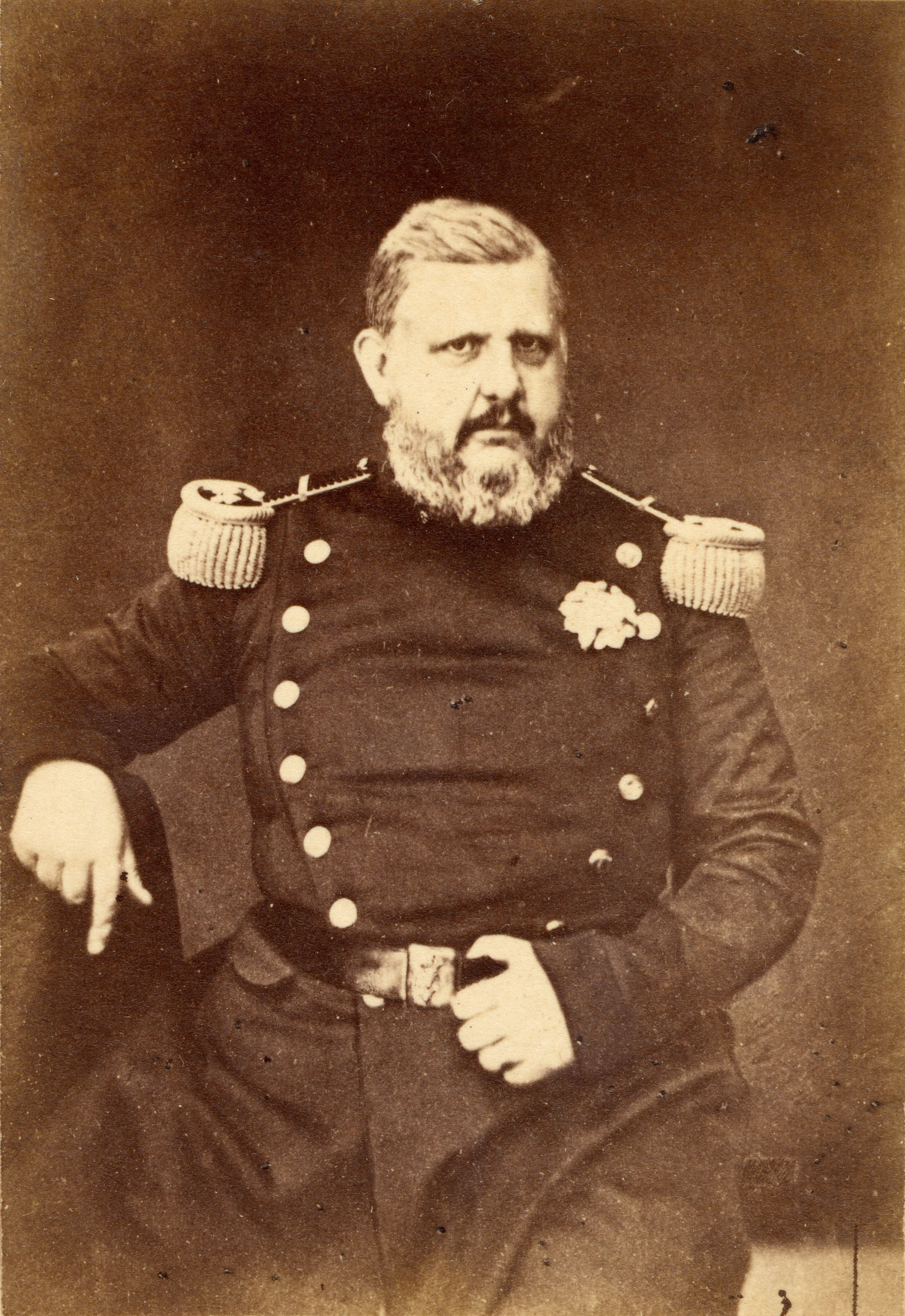
King Ferdinand II of the Two Sicilies

By the recapture of Sicily in May 1849, the battle was said to be practically over. Filangieri, however, dared not let his troops enter the set of alleys that then made up the historic center of Messina: although the regular Sicilian forces had been exterminated or forced to flee, the bombardment of the Bourbons continued on the defenseless city, that is, on the part that had not yet been occupied by the regi, for another seven hours. The soldiers of the Bourbon army partook in looting and violence against the inhabitants: "(The Swiss and the Napolitani marched only preceded by fires, followed by robberies, looting, murder, rape, etc.) Women were violated in churches, where they hoped for security, and then murdered, priests killed on altars, maidens cut to pieces, old and sick slaughtered in their own beds, whole families thrown from the windows or burned inside their homes, the Monti family of the loan looted, the sacred vases violated".

During the days of May 1849, there were numerous cases of civilians who were intentionally killed by Bourbon troops, who in some cases raped women who took refuge in churches before murdering them, killed all the children and murdered sick people in their beds, as happened for example for the elderly farmer Francesco Bombace, octuagenarian, and for the daughter of Letterio Russo, who was beheaded and whose breasts were amputated. Homes of foreigners living in Messina were also looted and destroyed, so much so that the English consul Barker reported the incident to his government writing that many English subjects living there were reduced to ruin and that even a diplomat, the consul of Greece and Bavaria M. G.M. Rillian, despite being in uniform, had been wounded by sabre, before his dwelling was also looted and burned down. The Bourbon troops did not spare even the religious buildings from looting. For example, the church of San Domenico, rich in works of art, was first looted of its sacred objects, then burned down and totally destroyed. Loss of life was incalculable. A Bourbon official wrote to his brother, immediately after the capture of Messina, stating that the Neapolitan departments had recaptured the city with a very intense fire and "trampling corpses in every step that progressed for the space of about two miles" and then commenting "What a horror! What a fire!" British Admiral Parker also condemned the work of the Bourbons, and in particular the prolonged terrorist bombardment of the city even after the end of all resistance for eight hours: "The greatest ferocity was shown by the Neapolitans, whose fury was incessant for eight hours, after all resistance had ceased".

During the siege of Messina, the last insurgents who resisted the attack of the Bourbons inside a convent, rather than hand themselves over, chose to throw themselves into a well, taking their tricolour flags with them. Messina was also troubled by the work of common criminals sent by King Ferdinand II to Sicily against the insurgents and that after tormenting the Sicilians for months with brigand actions (crimes, violence, thefts, etc.) they gave themselves at the time of the fall of the city to its looting, arriving with small boats from Calabria to make loot.

== See also ==
- Kingdom of the Two Sicilies
- Revolutions of 1848
- Revolutions of 1848 in the Italian states

== Bibliography ==
- Bellocchi, Ugo (2008). Bandiera madre – I tre colori della vita (in Italian). Scripta Maneant. ISBN 978-88-95847-01-6.
- Correnti, Santi (2002). A Short History of Sicily. Les Editions Musae. ISBN 978-2-922621-00-6.
- Scianò, Giuseppe (2004). Sicilia, Sicilia, Sicilia!: diario politico di un indipendentista nel primo anno del terzo millennio. Saggistica (in Italian). Palermo: Anteprima. ISBN 978-88-88701-06-6.
- Villa, Claudio (2010). I simboli della Repubblica: la bandiera tricolore, il canto degli italiani, l'emblema (in Italian). Comune di Vanzago. SBN IT\ICCU\LO1\1355389.
