= Statues and monuments of patriots on the Janiculum =

Coordinates: 41.888189°N 12.465277°E

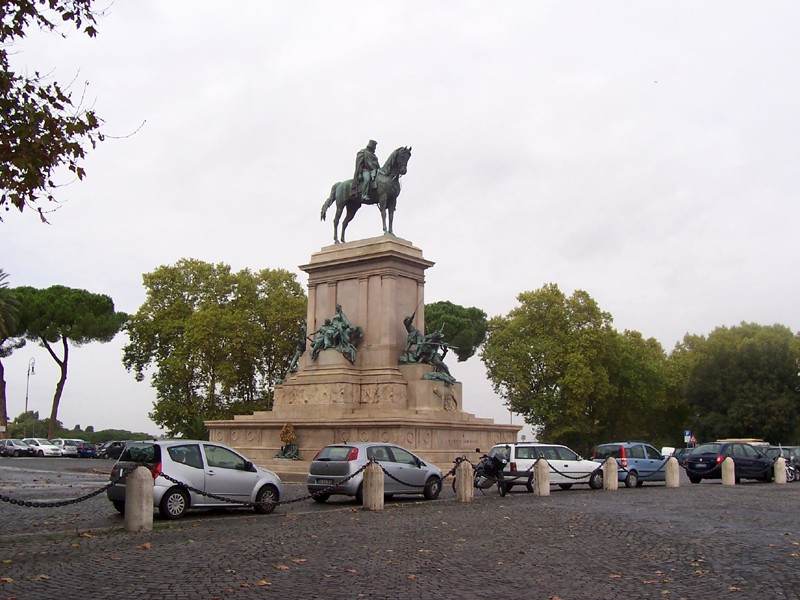
Equestrian monument dedicated to Giuseppe Garibaldi on the Janiculum

There are many busts of Italian patriots of the Risorgimento, and foreigners who fought with weapons or words for the unification of Italy, on the Janiculum in Rome.

== Overview ==
The Roman Republic commissioned marble busts to be displayed in the gardens of the Pincian Hill on May 28, 1849, for 10,000 lire. By the end of the war, the 52 busts had been made, but because of the temporary power of the Pope they remained in warehouses on Capitoline Hill.

In June 1851, Pius IX ordered the arrangement of most of the fifty-two busts in the gardens of the Pincian Hill. He excluded some busts because they were atheists. In 1860 the sculptors Achille Stocchi and Titus Sarrocchi were commissioned to create new busts. Their busts made a total of 228.

The initial placement of the statues took place between the end of 19th and early 20th centuries; the equestrian monument dedicated to Giuseppe Garibaldi was placed in 1896. In the 1920s, during the Fascist regime, the war memorial on the Janiculum was built for the Roman cause. It preserves the remains of some patriots.

The first restoration of the statues was done in the 1960s. Later more restorations were completed for the Great Jubilee, during which a Roman villa was discovered, and new statues were restored and relocated, including those of Anita Garibaldi, Giuseppe Garibaldi, and their children.

== Current monuments ==
The crest of the Janiculum is dominated by the 1895 equestrian Monument to Garibaldi, designed by Italian sculptor Emilio Gallori. This site was chosen for its proximity to the Villa Doria Pamphili, where Garibaldi mounted a military defense of the short-lived Roman Republic in late April 1849.

The hill also features a number of busts of historically significant Italians. All the busts were restored during 2010 and 2011, coinciding with the 150th anniversary of Italy. A 2011 guide published by the local Associazione Amilcare Cipriani group lists a total of 84 busts on the hill, 30 of them along the promenade north of the Garbaldi monument, and the rest to the south. The busts have been prone to vandalism.

== Statues on the Janiculum ==
Following is a partial list.

Name	Sculptor and year of inauguration	Birth and death	Biography
Luigi Masi	Belpassi, October 3, 1897	Petrignano (Assisi), 1814 – Palermo, 1872	Staff, Brigadier General and commander of the Umbria brigade. During the second Roman republic Roman, he strenuously defended Porta Cavalleggeri, Porta Evangelica, and Leonine City with the Second Brigade of the town militia and with a light infantry battalion. He also distinguished himself during the uprising in Palermo of 1866.
Luigi Ceccarini	Giuseppe Trabacchi, 1893	Rome, 1819–1887	He was captain, and later major, of the papal army during the First Italian War of Independence. He fought in Venice and Vicenza. He became a colonel in 1849 and went to Rome to defend the Republic. He was excluded from the amnesty of Pius IX and went into exile in Piedmont. He also fought in the campaigns of 1859 and 1866.
Pietro Pietramellara	Alfredo Luzi, 1886	Bologna, 1804 – Rome, 1849	A marquis of liberal tendencies, he defended Vicenza in 1848 and defended the second Roman Republic.
Alessandro La Marmora	Riccardo Grifoni, June 7, 1886	Turin, March 27, 1799 – Crimea, June 7, 1855	A Piedmontese general who promoted the formation of the Bersaglieri. As a colonel, he took part in the Crimean War, where he became ill with cholera and died in 1855.
Pietro Roselli	Pietro Benedictines, 1886	Rome, 1808 – Ancona, 1865	As part of the papal army in 1848, he fought in the War of Independence and in 1849 defended the second Roman Republic. In 1860 he entered the regular army with the rank of lieutenant general.
Alessandro Gavazzi	Raffaele Cotogni, 1892	Bologna, March 21, 1809 – Rome, January 9, 1889	A Barnabite, he wrote liberal tracts from 1846 to 1847. He was chaplain of the legion of volunteers led by A. Ferrari, who fought in the Veneto. He left the Barnabites in 1848, and in 1849 defended the new republic. He went into exile for 10 years abroad before returning for the campaigns of 1859, 1860, 1866, 1867.
Angelo Masina	Michele Capri, 1886–1887	Bologna, 1815 – Rome, June 3, 1849	Commander of the Garibaldi Cavalry, he was killed in the Palazzo Corsini during the second defense of the Roman Republic.
Ludovico Calandrelli	Enrico Simonetti, 1886	Rome, 1807 – Erzurum, 1855	He was captain of the artillery that defended the Second Roman Republic.
Luciano Manara	Ilarioli Antonio, 1886	Milan, March 23, 1825 – Rome, June 30, 1849	He died during the second defense of the Roman Republic.
Goffredo Mameli	Attilio Temperoni, 1926	Genoa, September 5, 1827 – Rome, July 7, 1849	He died during the second defense of the Roman Republic.
Nino Bixio	Biagio Salvatore, 1887	Genoa, October 2, 1821 – Sumatra, December 16, 1873	
Nicola Fabrizi		Modena, 1804 – Rome, 1885	
Natale Del Grande			
Giacomo Pagliari		Persico Dosimo, 1822 – Rome 1870	Austrian officer who died in the breach of Porta Pia
Giovanni Nicotera		Sambiase (Lamezia Terme), 1828 – Vico Equense, 1894	
Alessandro Calandrelli		Rome 1805 – Albano Laziale 1888	Papal artillery commander and general
Giacinto Bruzzesi		Cerveteri, 1822 – Turate, 1900	Lieutenant of the Roman Republic, he was one of four gold medal recipients.
Filippo Cerroti		Rome, 1819–1892 General	
Giacomo Medici		Milano, 1817 – Rome, 1882	Aide-de-camp to the king, senators, and marquises
Gaetano Sacchi		Pavia, 1824–1876	
Giuseppe Avezzana		Chieri, 1797 – Rome, 1879 General	
Francesco Daverio		Calcinate del Pesce (Varese) 1815 – Rome 1849	Chief of Staff of the Roman Republic, died in defense of the Casino dei Quattro Venti on the Janiculum.
Colomba Antonietti		Bastia Umbra, 1826 – Rome 1849 Wife of Luigi Porzi, she died at the port of St. Pancrazio	
Carlo Pisacane		Naples, August 22, 1818 – Sanza, July 2, 1857	Famous for the landing of the 300 at Sapri
Mattia Montecchi		Rome, 1816–1871	
Angelo Tittoni		Rome, 1820–1882	Commander of the Battaglione Universitario Romano in the battle of Vicenza, participated in the Roman Republic
Tommaso Salvini		Milan, January 1, 1829 – Florence, December 31, 1915	
Gustavo Modena		Venice, 1803 – Turin, 1861	
Ugo Bassi		Cento, August 12, 1801 – Bologna, August 8, 1849	He fought in the War of Independence, and he followed Garibaldi when he decided to continue fighting outside of Rome.He was captured by the Austrians in Bologna and executed by a firing squad.
Luigi Bartolucci		Cantiano, 1788 – Nice, 1859	General and friend of Garibaldi. He fought with Napoleon in the French invasion of Russia. He was captain in 1848 and deputy to the Constituent Assembly in Rome. As a General of a cavalry division of the Roman Republic, he heroically endured the French siege. After the fall of the Republic, he emigrated to England and Nice. He was awarded several orders and medals including the Legion of Honour and the order of the Iron Crown.
Righetto	Bronze replica of the marble L'audace Righetto of Giovanni Strazza (1818–1875) created in 1851.		The brave Righetto (1851). Replica of the statue in the lobby of the grand staircase in Palazzo Litta. It portrays a 12-year-old child who died with his dog in 1849 while trying to stop a bomb during the defense of the Repubblica Romana in 1849. See Military use of children.
Menotti Garibaldi		Mostardas, September 16, 1840 – Rome, August 22, 1903	Son of Garibaldi
Ricciotti Garibaldi	1931	Montevideo, February 24, 1847 – Riofreddo, July 17, 1924	Son of Garibaldi
Constante Garibaldi	1932, Constantino Garibaldi		Son of Ricciotti Garibaldi. He died in his early twenties in Argonne.
Bruno Garibaldi	1931		Son of Ricciotti Garibaldi. He died in his early twenties in Argonne.
Giacomo Venezian	September 9, 1895	Trieste, 1824 – Rome, July 2, 1849	Sergeant of the Medici Legion. In 1848 he led an unsuccessful revolutionary movement in Trieste. In 1849 he participated in the War of Independence. He was mortally wounded by the French on June 22, 1849 while defending the Casino Barberini. He died on July 2 at age 25.
Maurizio Quadrio	1911, Spontini	Chiavenna, 1800 – Rome, 1876	He participated in the November Uprising of 1830. He defended Rome in 1849. He went into exile in Marseille, Switzerland, and London. He was a member of the Action Party and the Italian Republican Party.
Bartolomeno Filipperi	1911, Giovanni Cozza	Rome, 1833–1877	In 1849 he fought on the barricades of Porta San Pancrazio and the event inspired his painting La difesa del Vascello. He went into exile in Nîmes for ten years. He followed Giuseppe Garibaldi in 1854 and 1867.
Achille Sacchi	1911, Giovanni Prini	Mantua, 1827–1890	A volunteer in the War of Independence, he tenaciously defended Porta San Pancrazio in 1849. He hatched an insurrection in 1853 with Mazzini, which led to his exile in Switzerland.He participated in Garibaldi's campaigns of 1859, 1860, and 1866. Afterwards, he returned to Mantua where he directed the local insane asylum.
Quirico Filopanti	1911, A. Pantoresi	Budrio, 1812 – Bologna, 1894	A writer with degree in mathematics and physics, he taught at the University of Bologna. He participated as a volunteer in the war of 1848. He was Deputy Secretary of the Constituent Assembly of the Roman Republic. In 1849 he went in exile in London. He was a deputy of the extreme left.
Carlo Mayr	1911, M. Trispiciano	Ferrara, 1810–1882	A soldier with Garibaldi, who was the interior minister of the Roman Republic.He was senator of the Kingdom of Italy.
Carlo Bontemps	1911, Riccardo Rossi		
Domenico Piva	1928, Enrico Quattrini	Rovigo, 1826–1907	He took part in the defense of Rome in 1849 and was wounded in the head. He was captured by Austrians and was forced to enlist in the Austrian army for eight years. He was discharged in 1860 and joined Garibaldi as a lieutenant in the Compagnia dei Mille. He became a lieutenant general.
Nino Costa	1911, Giovanni Cozza	Rome, 1833–1877	
Raffaele Tosi	1949, V. Mancoratti		He took part in the campaigns of 1848–49, 1859–60, and 1866–67. The bust was proffered by the family.
Giuseppe Rosi	1912, G. Mangionello	Calcara di Ussita, 1798 – Rome, 1891	He was a poet and pastor.
Oreste Tiburzi	1911, Aurelio Temperoni	Rome, 1825–1849	He was a friend of Philip Casini.
Filippo Zamboni		Trieste, 1826 – Vienna, 1910	When he was 22 years old, he took part in the defense of the Roman Republic. He taught literature in the Accademia Commerciale di Vicenza.
Alessandro MelonI	1941, C. Docchi	Imola, 1813 – Rome, 1849	As a young man he fought in 1848 in Vicenza and Venice. He was made a captain. He took part in the defense of Rome in 1849 and at Porta S. Pancrazio was mortally wounded in front of Garibaldi who promoted him to Major on the day of his death.
Bernardo Serafini		Serungarina, 1822–1906	He was a liberal who conspired against the papal government. He fought in the War of Independence in Sicily. He was a deputy until 1886, when he joined the Senate.
Raffaele De Benedetto	1941, Benedetto De Lisi	Palermo – Rome, 1867	A major under Garibaldi, he died during the 1867 Rome insurrection.
John Whitehead Peard	Giovanni Paganucci – 1904 set in Janiculum	Fowey 1811 – Trenython, 1880	British captain and lawyer, colonel in Garibaldi's Expedition 1860, known as “Garibaldi’s Englishman”.
