= Peard =

Peard may refer to:

== People ==
- Frances Mary Peard (1835–1923), English novelist
- George Peard (1594–1645), English politician
- John Peard (born 1945), Australian rugby league footballer (soccer player) and coach
- John Whitehead Peard (1811–1880), British soldier, the son of Shuldham Peard
- Shuldham Peard (1761–1832), British admiral, father of John Whitehead Peard
- Susan Devlin Peard (born 1931), also known as Sue Peard, Irish-born American badminton player who competed for Ireland and the United States

== Places ==
- Peard Bay, a bay in the Chukchi Sea in Alaska in the United States
- Peard Bay DEW Line Station, an abandoned United States Air Force Distant Early Warning Line Radar station that closed in 1963
