= Giuseppe Rosi =

Italian poet and patriot

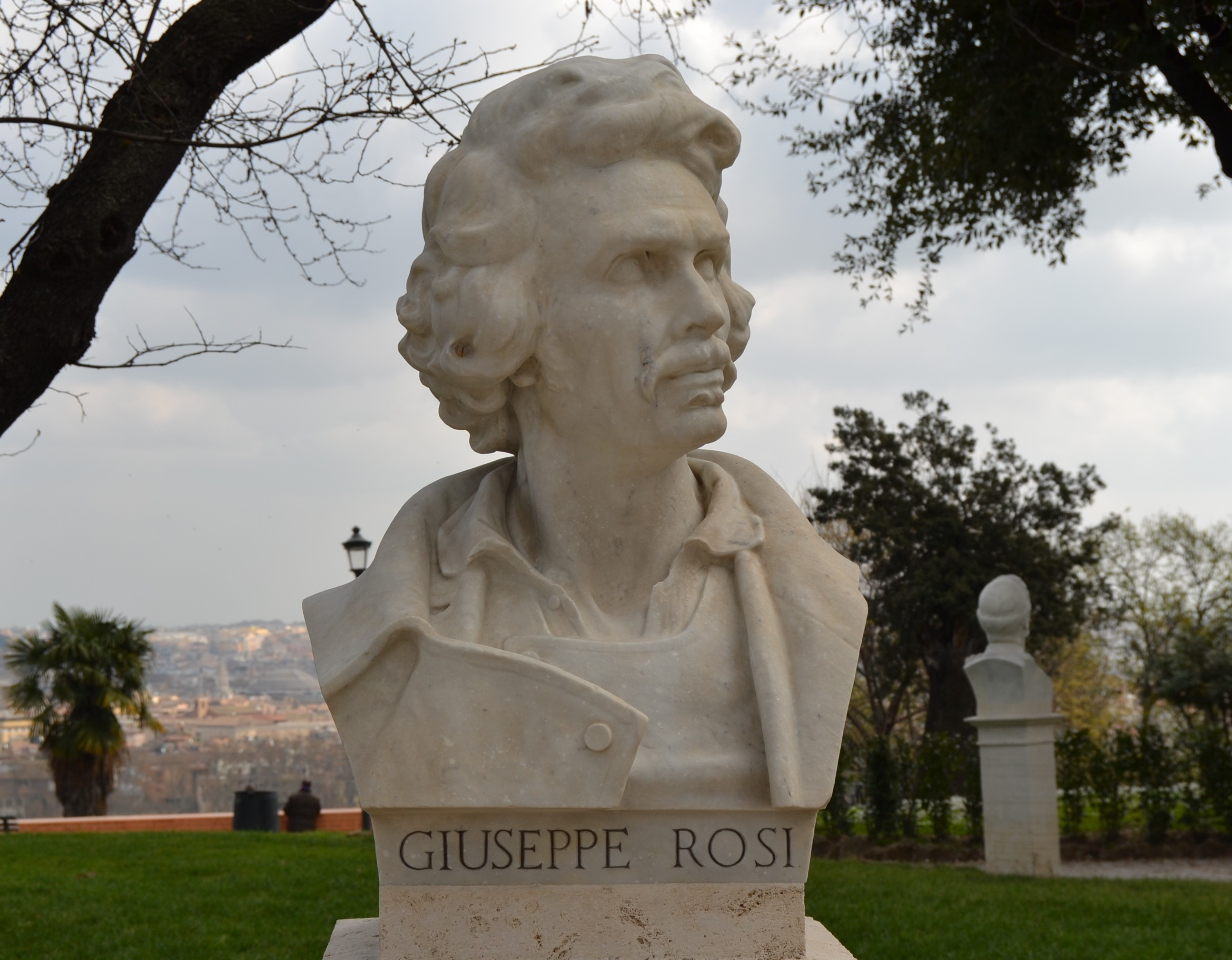
- Portrait of Giuseppe Rosi on Gianicolo, made by Giuseppe Mangionello.
- Born: 8 January 1798; Calcara di Ussita
- Died: 9 March 1891; Roma
- Other names: Poeta Pastore
- Occupations: patriot, poet

Giuseppe Rosi (Calcara di Ussita, 8 January 1798 – Rome, 9 March 1891) was an Italian poet and patriot known as poeta pastore.

== Life ==
Born in Ussita into a family of farmers, Rosi earned the nickname "poet shepherd" (poeta-pastore). Initially supportive of Pope Pius IX, for whom he composed the piece "Oh Italia, Italia, dolce suol natìo," Rosi later became disillusioned with him and aligned himself with the ideals of the Italian Risorgimento.

Beginning in 1821, Rosi was an adherent of the Carboneria. Later, in 1831, he joined the Giovane Italia of Giuseppe Mazzini. He actively participated in the revolutions of 1848, 1859, and 1870. He was named captain of the Stato Maggiore by Giuseppe Garibaldi during the Second Roman Republic, as shown by two letters from Garibaldi himself (29 February and 29 March 1849), with whom he became a close friend. After the fall of the Republic, Rosi was captured by the authorities and remained in jail for three years. He was later imprisoned again due to his renewed involvement in the activism for Italian unification. He was with Garibaldi again in 1867, and after the capture of Rome in 1870, he finally moved to Rome, where he lived until his death.

Rosi was portrayed in a statue by Giuseppe Mangionello placed on the Gianicolo in Rome in 1912 and in another statue and a street in his native town.

== Bibliography ==
- Giuseppe Rosi, Vita e poesie politiche di Giuseppe Rosi, detto il Poeta Pastore, E. Mantegazza, Roma, 1912
