= Trabacchi =

Trabacchi is an Italian surname. Notable people with the surname include:

- Giuseppe Trabacchi (1839–1909), Italian sculptor
- Thomas Trabacchi (born 1965), Italian actor

== See also ==
- Trabocchi Coast
