= Cispius (disambiguation) =

Cispius may refer to:

- various members of the Roman gens Cispia; see also Cispius.
- the Mons Cispius, or Cispian Hill, one of several summits of the Esquiline Hill in Rome.
- Cispius (spider), a genus of spider.
