= Southern Army (Italy) =

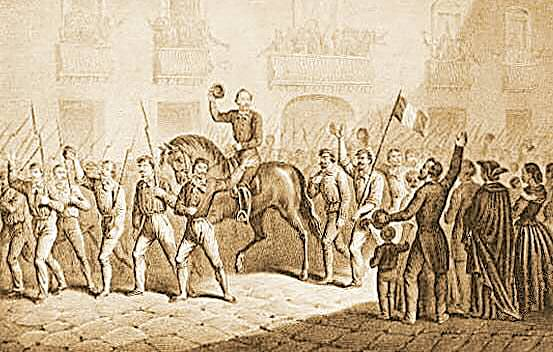
The Medici column enters Palermo.

The Southern Army (Italian: esercito meridionale) was the force of around 50,000 Italian and foreign volunteers which formed as a result of the Expedition of the Thousand. The name was coined by Giuseppe Garibaldi. Its officers wore red uniforms and so - like the Thousand - the force's rank and file became known as redshirts. It was dissolved before the proclamation of the Kingdom of Italy.

== History ==
=== Landing at Marsala and the picciotti ===
Garibaldi landed at Marsala in May 1860 with the Thousand, a force mainly made up of northern Italian volunteers but also including 45 Sicilians. They were immediately joined by around 200 more Sicilian volunteers, with still more joining when Garibaldi proclaimed his dictatorship of Sicily and Salemi, led by the Sant'Anna brothers.

On 14 May 500 Sicilian volunteers arrived from the Erice campaign under the command of Giuseppe Coppola and the doctor Rocco La Russa. They then fought at the Battle of Calatafimi. By the time the 'picciotti' arrived in Palermo they numbered 3,000 and at the end of the battle had reached 6,602.

=== Sicilian national militia ===
Garibaldi's second dictatorial decree on 14 May formed a national Sicilian militia and set up a tax to fund keeping public order. Men between 17 and 30 would join the army as the active militia, those from 30 to 40 would maintain public order at a district level and those from 40 to 50 would keep order in their own towns. The decree also introduced compulsory conscription for men between 17 and 50. The militia was subdivided into battalions, each made up of four companies with 60-150 militiamen each. It was placed under the command of Nicolò Turrisi Colonna within the Italian National Guard and by decree number 289 on 22 October 1860 'prodittatore' Antonio Mordini placed it under the commander in chief.

=== Reinforcements and reorganisation ===
Only 600 of the Thousand remained after Palermo was captured on 30 May, but in June reinforcements from northern Italy began to arrive by sea - the first as the 'Agnetta expedition' on 1 June, followed by 2,500 men under Giacomo Medici. 800 more volunteers, then attached to Enrico Cosenz's division, sailed from Genoa in the steamer 'Washington' on 2 July (a letter by Ignazio Invernizzi describes the voyage) and landed at Palermo on 5 July, reinforcing the forces at the Battle of Milazzo - Another column left Genoa under Gaetano Sacchi's command on 16 July, including several Mantuans. Other contingents also headed south, with several other volunteers setting off from Genoa and Livorno.

Another decree issued by Garibaldi's dictatorial regime as "commander in chief of the national forces in Sicily" on 2 July set up a Sicilian army formed of the XV and XVI divisions, commanded by Stefano Turr and Giuseppe Paternò respectively and totalling five brigades. A final decree on 3 July set up a "Sicilian navy" (Marina militare siciliana). On 14 July the 'Corpo dei Carabinieri di Sicilia' was established.

When Garibaldi's forces landed in Calabria on 19 August they were joined by Calabrian volunteers and after its arrival in Basilicata the 2,000 men of the 'Lucana Brigade' joined him and the 'Sicilian army' was renamed the 'southern army'. During the redshirts' advance even more volunteers joined little by little from all across southern Italy, making a major contribution to the battle of the Volturno, at which they outnumbered the Savoy element in Garibaldi's forces. When Vittorio Emanuele II of Savoy's army reached the front line in October 1860, Garibaldi handed over his force of around 50,000 redshirts to him and returned to Caprera.

On 6 May 1860 Domenico Damis and the Thousand left Genoa for Marsala. From Sicily he advised the patriots from Lungro to prepare to follow Garibaldi to Naples. When news spread of his arrival, 500 volunteers set out from Lungro alone.

== Structure ==
=== Foreign volunteers ===
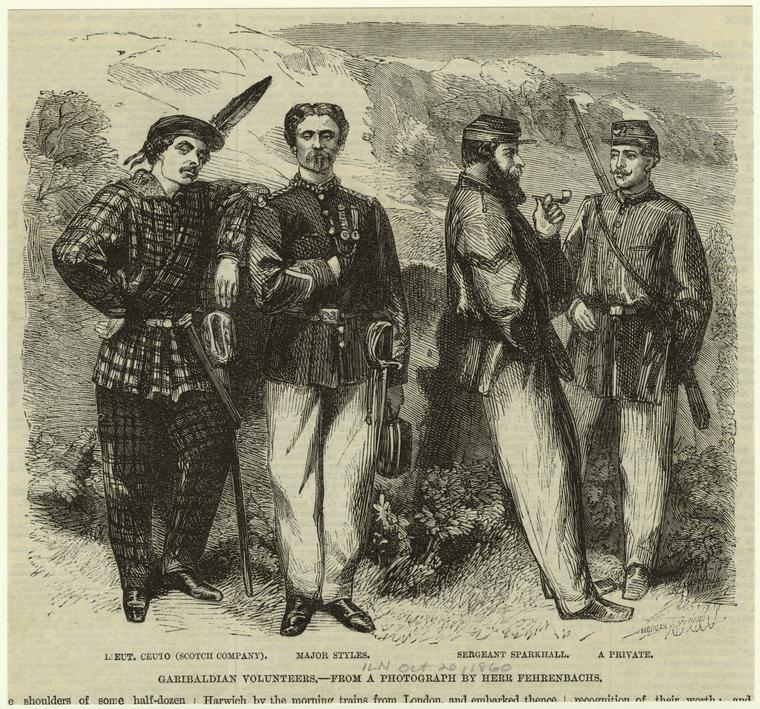
British volunteers

The force also included non-Italian volunteers, joining at different times. Around 200 Hungarian cavalry and 200 Hungarian infantry fought in the battle on 1–2 October, at which point 50 French volunteers under Paolo De Flotte had already fallen in Calabria. The Southern Army also included 100 foreign Bourbon deserters commanded by Adolfo Wolff and "a few score of English". There were also 3,000 Bourbon soldiers under Von Mechel, as well as some Swiss companies known as "Schweizertruppen". On 15 October the 600-strong British Legion disembarked from the SS Emperor and SS Melazzo at Naples - it was also known by the euphemism of the 'Garibaldi Excursionists' after the Foreign Enlistment Act forbade British citizens enlisting in foreign armies.

Several thousand Sicilians enlisted in the force whilst it was still in Sicily and were trained by Sicilian, northern Italian and British officers., whilst the Garibaldi Division's chief of staff was the German Wilhelm Friedrich Rüstow, who in 1862 published an account of the campaign as The Italian War. The earliest foreign volunteer was the English engineer and linguist Hugh Forbes, who had fought alongside Garibaldi as early as 1849. Others included Percy Wyndham, the Irish artilleryman Dick Dowling and for short periods the Americans Chatham Roberdeau Wheat and Charles Carrol Hicks, who returned to America to fight in the Confederate Army, along with Garibaldi's 'English-Garibaldian' body-double John Whitehead Peard.

One of the most notable foreign volunteers in the Southern Army was the English colonel John William Dunne, nicknamed 'milordo' by the Sicilian street-urchins he enlisted into his regiment. Only some of the officers in Dunne's regiment were British and its soldiers were all Sicilians He was injured at Capua. There were also many Scottish volunteers such as captain Cowper of Aberdeen, noted for his command of an artillery battery at Volturno - Garibaldi was very popular in Scotland, where many saw him as an Italian William Wallace fighting for national freedom. The foreign officers also included the exiled Hungarians István Türr., Nándor Éber, Carlo Eberhardt and Lajos Tüköry (who fell at Palermo), the Polish soldier Aleksander Izenschmid de Milbitz and the "Finnish-Garibaldian" Herman Liikanen. Türr, Peard and Liikanen were all given busts on the Janiculum.

These foreign volunteers arose from Italian political refugees fleeing to Britain, where they met not only British sympathisers but Hungarian and Polish political refugees with similar nationalist and anti-Habsburg sentiments. They had also raised British awareness on the issue of Italian unification and formed associations such as the People's International League, founded by Giuseppe Mazzini in 1847, replaced in 1856 by the Emancipation of Italy Fund Committee led by Aurelio Saffi, Jessie White, Alessandro Gavazzi and Felice Orsini, which set up a conference circuit in Britain and the USA. Funds were also raised by the Italian Refugee Fund from 1849 onwards, the Society of the Friends of Italy (with patrons including Caroline Ashurst Stansfeld and her politician husband James Stansfeld, both Mazzini supporters). Garibaldi was already popular in Britain and the USA in 1849, which also contributed to the rise in foreign volunteers. 1859 saw the foundation of the Garibaldi Fund in the UK, followed in 1860 by the Garibaldi Special Fund the following year to fund the British Legion and the Garibaldi Italian Unity Committee to back complete Italian unification and the annexation of what was left of the Italian states.

== Bibliography (in Italian) ==
- Gaetano Falzone, Sicilia 1860, Flaccovio, 1978.
- Rosario Romeo, Vita di Cavour, Roma-Bari, Laterza, 1998, ISBN 88-420-7491-8.
- Cecchinato E., Camicie rosse. I garibaldini dall'Unità alla grande guerra, Laterza, Roma-Bari 2007.
- Cecchinato E., Isnenghi Mario, La nazione volontaria, in Storia d'Italia. Annali 22. Il Risorgimento, Einaudi, Torino 2007, pp. 697 - 720.
- Martucci R., L'invenzione dell'Italia unita 1855-1864. Sansoni, Firenze 1999.
- Riall L., Garibaldi. L'invenzione di un eroe, Laterza, Roma-Bari 2007.
- Riall L., La Sicilia e l'unificazione italiana. Politica locale e potere liberale (1815-1866), Einaudi, Torino 2004.
- Osvaldo Perini, F. Candiani (editor), La Spedizione dei Mille – Storia documentata della liberazione della Bassa Italia, Milano, 1861.
