= Southern Army =

Southern Army may refer to:

- Southern Expeditionary Army Group, part of the Imperial Japanese Army during the World War II era
- Southern Army, a name under which Southern Command of the British Indian Army operated from 1942–45
- Southern Army of Gondor, from J. R. R. Tolkien's Middle-earth fiction
- Confederate States Army of the U.S. Civil War
- Southern Army (Italy)
- Southern Army (Syria), an Israeli-proposed paramilitary force in southern Syrian.
