= Daverio (surname) =

Daverio is a surname. Notable people with the surname include:

- Francesco Daverio (1815–1849), Italian patriot
- John Daverio (1954–2003), American violinist, scholar, teacher, and author
- Philippe Daverio (1949–2020), Italian art critic, teacher, writer, author, politician, and television personality
