= HMS Britannia (1762) =

Ship of the line of the Royal Navy

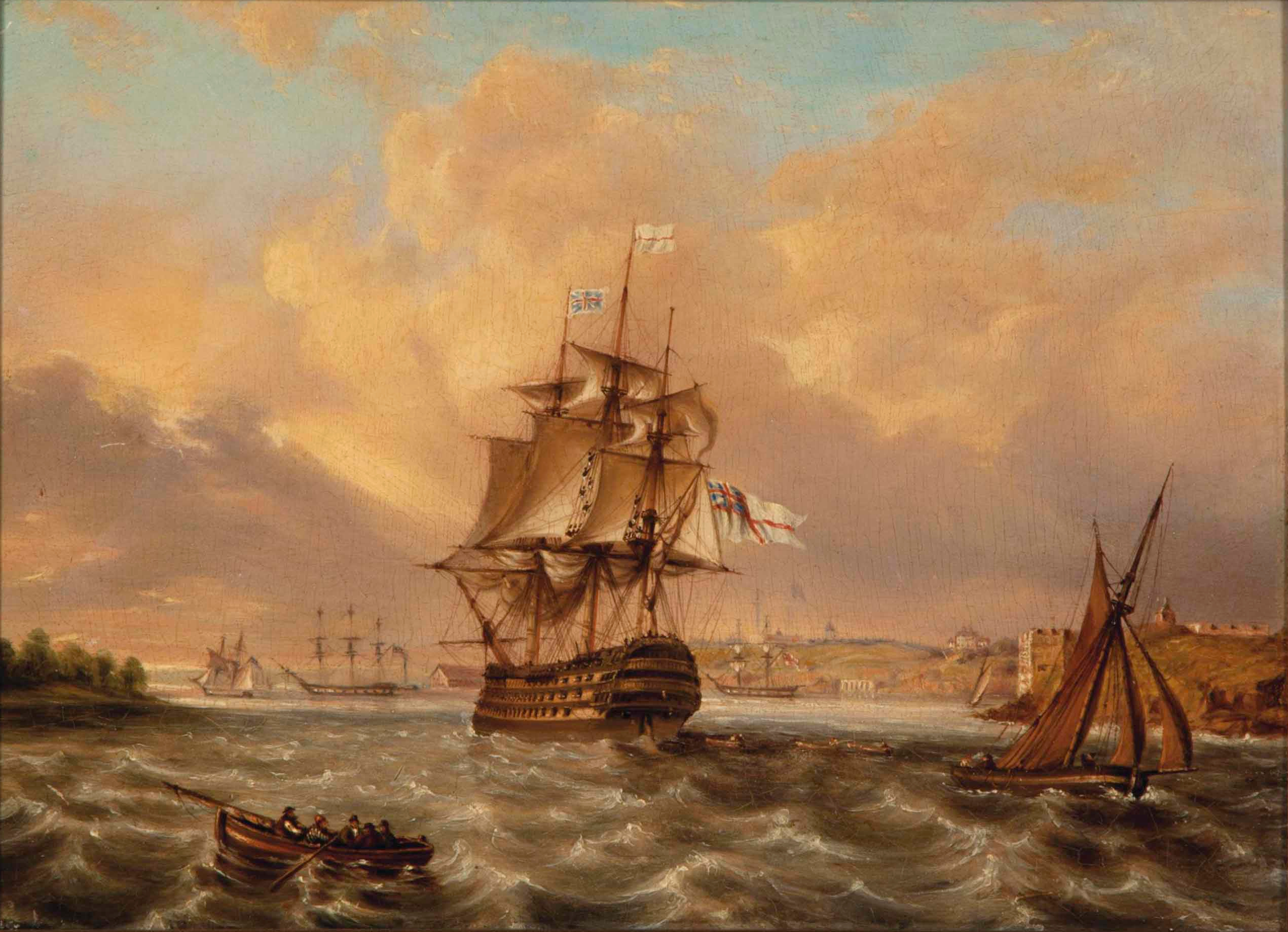
- 1820 painting of Britannia on the Hamoaze entering Devonport

History

Great Britain
- Name: Britannia
- Ordered: 25 April 1751
- Builder: Portsmouth Dockyard
- Cost: £45,844/2s/8d
- Laid down: 1 July 1751
- Launched: 19 October 1762
- Renamed: HMS Princess Royal – 6 January 1810; HMS St. George – 18 January 1812; HMS Barfleur – 2 June 1819
- Nickname(s): Old Ironsides
- Honours and awards: Participated in: Battle of Cape Spartel (1782); Battle of Genoa (1795); Battle of the Hyères Islands (1795); Battle of Cape St. Vincent (1797); Battle of Trafalgar (1805)
- Fate: Broken up, 1825

General characteristics
- Class & type: 1745 Establishment 100-gun first rate ship of the line
- Tons burthen: 2116
- Length: 178 ft (54.3 m) (gundeck)
- Beam: 51 ft (15.5 m)
- Depth of hold: 21 ft 6 in (6.6 m)
- Propulsion: Sails
- Sail plan: Full-rigged ship
- Complement: 850 officers and men
- Armament: 100 guns: Gundeck: 28 × 42 pdrs; Middle gundeck: 28 × 24 pdrs; Upper gundeck: 28 × 12 pdrs; Quarterdeck: 12 × 6 pdrs; Forecastle: 4 × 6 pdrs

HMS Britannia was a 100-gun first-rate ship of the line of the Royal Navy. The vessel was laid down in 1751 and launched in 1762. Nicknamed Old Ironsides, she served in the American Revolutionary War, the French Revolutionary Wars and the Napoleonic Wars, including at the Battle of Trafalgar in 1805. One of the largest Royal Navy warships of her era, Britannia was one of only three British first-rates present at the battle, alongside HMS Victory and HMS Royal Sovereign. In 1806, the vessel was laid up and eventually converted into a hulk, before being broken up in 1825.

== Construction ==
She was ordered on 25 April 1751 from Portsmouth Dockyard to the draught specified in the 1745 Establishment. She was built by Thomas Bucknall. Her keel was laid down on 1 July 1751 and she was launched on 19 October 1762. The cost of building and fitting totalled £45,844/2s/8d. Her main gundeck armament of twenty-eight 42-pounder guns was later replaced by 32-pounders. In the 1790s ten of her quarterdeck guns and two of her forecastle guns were replaced by the same number of 32-pounder carronades. She was third of seven ships to bear the name Britannia.

== Service ==
Britannia was first commissioned in August 1778, under the command of Captain Charles Morice Pole, for the American Revolutionary War. The ship was the flagship of Vice-Admiral George Darby between April 1779 and June, at which point Rear-Admiral Sir John Lockhart-Ross replaced Darby. Britannia was coppered at Portsmouth Dockyard in January 1780, and in September Captain James Bradby assumed command. He was in turn replaced by Captain Benjamin Hall in April 1782, with Britannia being paid off in February the following year. The ship underwent a repair at Portsmouth between May 1788 and September 1790 at the cost of £35,573.

Britannia was recommissioned for the French Revolutionary War in January 1793, under the command of Captain John Holloway. She was appointed flagship to Vice-Admiral William Hotham, and sailed for the Mediterranean Sea on 11 May. There she fought in the Battle of Genoa on 14 March 1795, and at the Battle of the Hyères Islands on 13 July. In January the following year Holloway was replaced in command by Captain Shuldham Peard as the ship became flagship to Vice-Admiral Hyde Parker, and Peard handed over to Captain Thomas Foley in May. Vice-Admiral Charles Thompson took Britannia as his flagship early in 1797, and as such the ship fought at the Battle of Cape St. Vincent on 14 February, in which she had one man wounded.

In March Captain Sir Charles Knowles replaced Foley, and Captain Edward March in turn replaced him in around June. The ship was then paid off in December. In 1800 Britannia was adapted to become a convalescence ship, and she then underwent a repair between June 1801 and January 1802 at the cost of £21,739. With the Napoleonic Wars having begun, the ship was then recommissioned by Captain Lord Northesk in April 1803 to serve on the Brest blockade. In April 1804 Northesk was promoted to rear-admiral, and Britannia became his flagship with Captain Charles Bullen assuming command in June. On 21 October 1805 Britannia fought in the windward column of the British fleet at the Battle of Trafalgar, in which she had ten men killed and a further forty-two wounded. Then in 1806 the ship was laid up in the Hamoaze.

On 6 January 1810 Britannia was renamed Princess Royal, and then again to Saint George on 18 January 1812. By 1813 Saint George was in ordinary in Plymouth Dockyard, and there between October and December she was converted into a prison ship. In the following year she was recommissioned in that role, under the command of Lieutenant John Cawkit. The ship then underwent another refit between March and June 1815 to enable her to serve as a receiving ship and flagship. In March she was recommissioned under the command of Captain James Nash, becoming the flagship of Admiral Sir John Duckworth, Commander-in-Chief, Plymouth. Saint George was paid off in December and renamed to Barfleur on 2 June 1819. Ordered to be broken up after this, the process was completed on 25 February 1825.
