= Santa Maria Assunta, Ussita =

Church building in Ussita, Italy

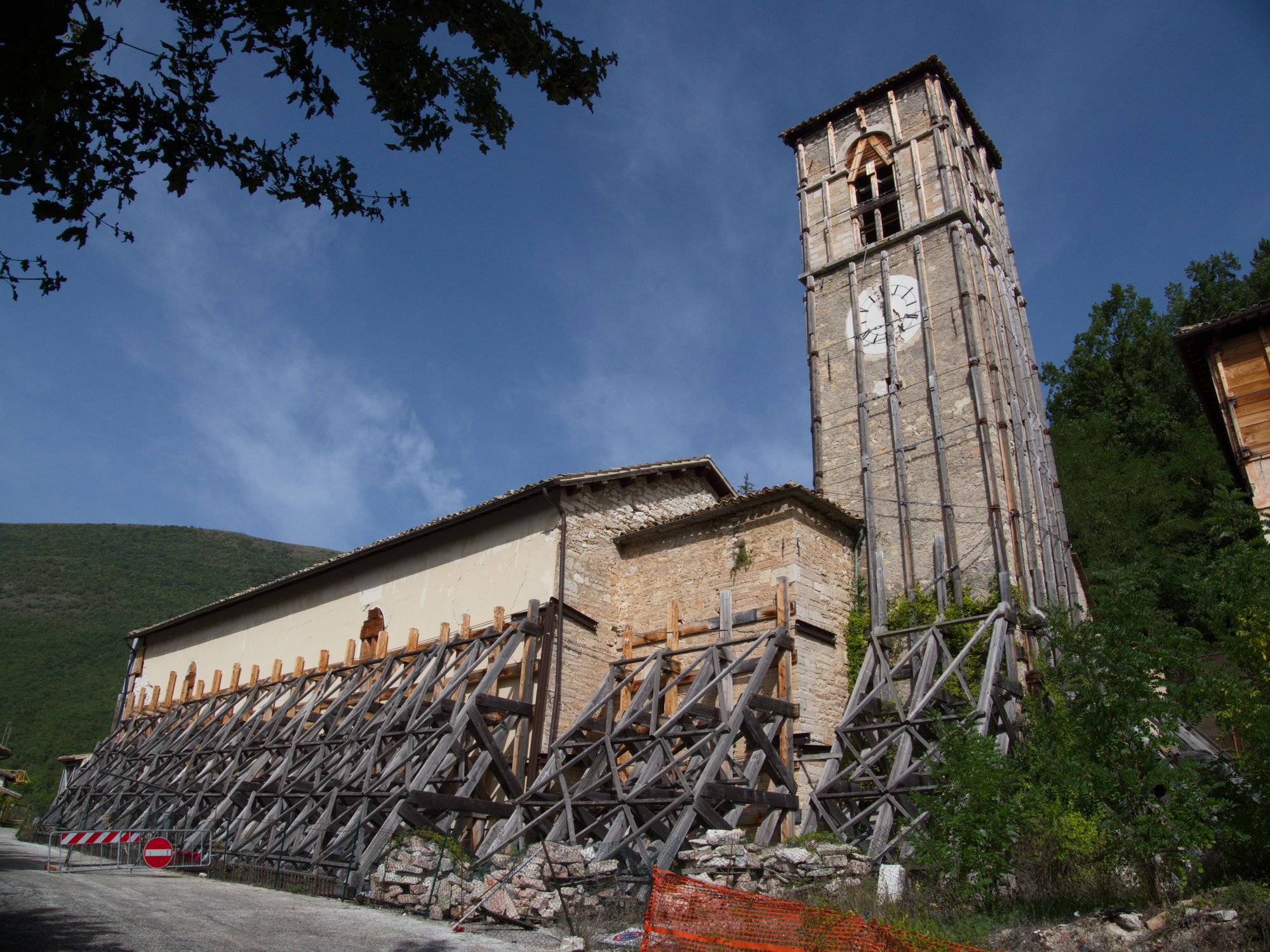

Santa Maria Assunta is a Romanesque and Gothic-style, Roman Catholic church located in the town of Ussita, province of Macerata, region of Marche, Italy.

== History ==
The church was built in the 14th century. The façade had a rose window and narrow peaked lateral windows. The interior has 15th-century frescoes by Paolo da Visso and 16th-century frescoes by Camillo and Fabio Angelucci. The church suffered grave damage from the 2016 earthquake.
