= Santi Vincenzo e Anastasio, Ussita =

Church building in Ussita, Italy

Santi Vincenzo e Anastasio is a Romanesque-style, Roman Catholic church located in the frazione of Casali, some 6 kilometers outside of the town of Ussita, province of Macerata, region of Marche, Italy.

== History ==
The small stone church was originally built in 1093 to house an eremitic lodging of Benedictines, linked to the Sant'Eutizio di Preci monastery. The apse is semicircular, and the portal has a rounded arch with a mullioned window above. The belfry with two bells is a sail-like projection above the tympanum. The church suffered damage from the 2016 earthquake. The interior houses an altarpiece depicting Christ between Saints Vincenzo and Anastasio (1638) attributed to Angelo Righi.
