= British Legion (1860) =

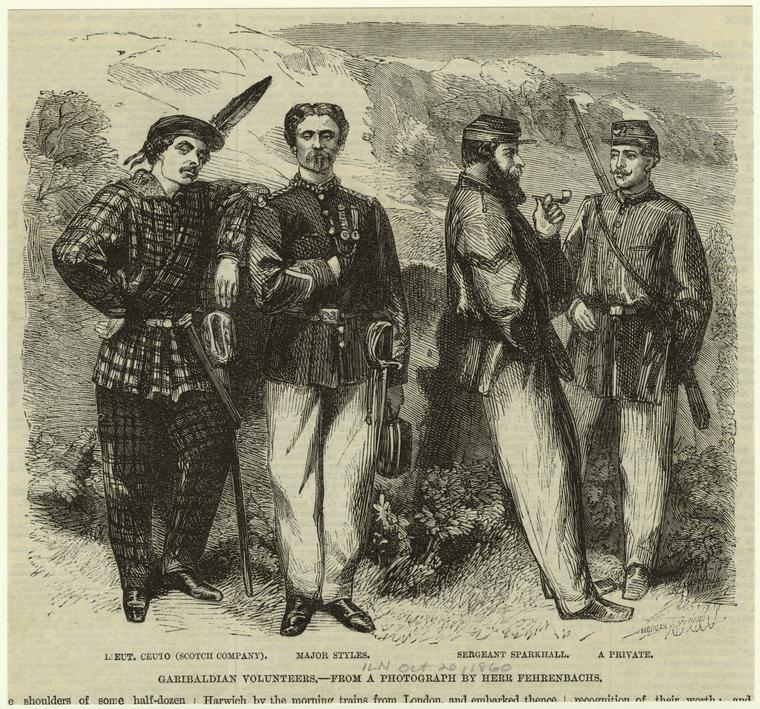
- Volunteers of the British Legion
- Active: 1860–1861
- Country: United Kingdom
- Engagements: Expedition of the Thousand

The British Legion (Italian: Legione Britannica) was a military corps composed of English and Scottish volunteers, who in 1860 joined Giuseppe Garibaldi during the Expedition of the Thousand and fought for the unification of Italy, together with the Italian Redshirts, as part of their Southern Army against the Bourbon Army of the Kingdom of the Two Sicilies.

Officially they were "Garibaldi Excursionists" to avoid any problems of diplomatic appearance and were recruited by Major Styles, who appears in the engraving wearing his uniform and medal of the Crimean War.

The departure of "The British Legion" was financed by the "Garibaldi Special Fund Committee", one of the British organizations supporting the unification of Italy.

== Recruiting of the Legion ==
The advertisement that enlisted them ran as follows: "Excursion to Sicily and Naples. All persons (particularly Members of Volunteer Rifle Corps) desirous of visiting Southern Italy and of aiding by their presence and influence the 'Cause of Garibaldi and Italy', may learn how to proceed by applying to the Garibaldi Committee at the offices, No. 8 Salisbury Street, London."

== The volunteers ==
The volunteers of the British Legion are described in a news item of The Illustrated London News of Oct. 20, 1860 regarding the departure from Harwich of 800 Englishmen and Scotchmen, who put their sword at the disposal of Garibaldi.

The Illustrated London News remarks that, including volunteers already with Garibaldi, the total amount is a considerable more than 1,000 volunteers in the Garibaldian Army, often from middle-class or well-paid jobs, who left their country attracted by adventure and love of freedom, to fight for the liberty of a foreign country.

Before their departure from England other British volunteers were already at the side of Garibaldi in the south of Italy, such as Hugh Forbes, who was with Garibaldi in 1849, taking part in the defence of the Roman Republic against the French troops supporting the papacy, John Whitehead Peard, and the Colonel John Dunne and his "English battalion" of soldiers who were all Sicilians and called Dunne "Milordo". Dunne was wounded in Capua, Percy Wyndam and several others. John Whitehead Peard took the lead of the British Legion after its landing in Naples.

After having sailed from Great Britain by the ships Melazzo and Emperor, the British Legion landed in Naples on 15 October 1860 and took part in a fight, under the command of John Whitehead Peard in Sant'Angelo up to the wall of Capua, where two volunteers were killed and eight wounded.

Even if a half of the volunteers were enthusiastic and behaved properly, there were some roughs, principally from Glasgow and London who lacked discipline, so the Legion acquired a name for disorder similar to that which the Pope's Irish Zouaves had acquired in Rome. The Italians said "indulgently", "these men are not accustomed to a country where wine is cheap."

== The Legion on the battlefield ==
The Legion had a short war experience, after having advanced northwards with Garibaldi and a few regiments of Italians, on the morning of October 26, while they were in Vajrano, an Englishman from the Garibaldian outposts heard the war-cry Viva il re!, "Long live the king!", usually shouted by the soldiers of the Bourbon Army, but it was the same war-cry from the Royal Sardinian Army of King Victor Emmanuel II, the future King of Italy, coming from the north. The red-shirts were replaced by the king's army in the final siege of the fortress of Gaeta, where the Bourbon Army surrendered in February 1861.

== Sources ==
- Trevelyan, George Macaulay (1911). Garibaldi and the making of Italy.
- Janet Fyfe, Scottish volunteers with Garibaldi, Scottish Historical Review Trust, Edinburgh, 1978.
- Marcella Pellegrino Sutcliffe, British Red Shirts: A History of the Garibaldi Volunteers (1860), University of Cambridge, Chapter 12 of Transnational Soldiers: Foreign Military Enlistment in the Modern Era by di N. Arielli, B. Collins,
- Antony P. Campanella, La Legione Britannica nell'Italia meridionale con Garibaldi nel 1860, Fondazione "Ignazio Mormino" del Banco di Sicilia, 1964.
- G.J. Holyoake, Bygones Worth remembering, Chapter XX, The story of the British Legion, London, 1905.
