= Francesco Daverio =

Italian unification patriot and engineer

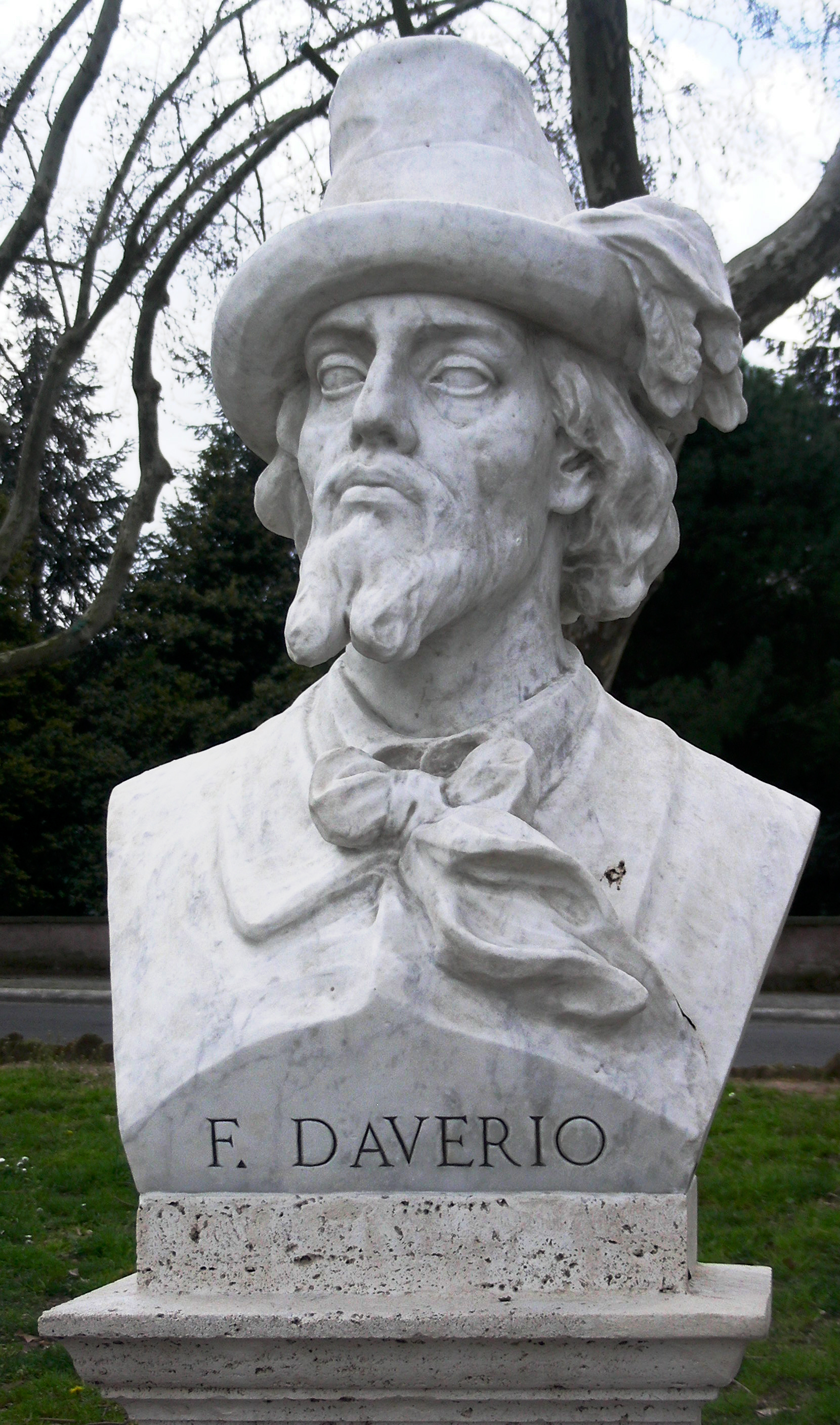
- Bust of Francesco Daverio on the Janiculum in Rome
- Born: April 3, 1815; Varese, Italy
- Died: June 3, 1849 (aged 34); Rome, Italy
- Education: University of Pavia
- Movement: Il Risorgimento (Unification of Italy)
- Parent(s): Giovan Battista and Maria Cerutti.

Francesco Daverio (April 3, 1815 in Varese – June 3, 1849 in Rome) was a patriot of the Italian unification, Chief of Staff of the Roman Republic, and an engineer, who died on the Janiculum defending the Casino dei quattro venti.

Daverio took part in the Five Days of Milan in March 1848. In August 1848, he was sent by Giuseppe Mazzini to guide Giuseppe Garibaldi in the campaign in Varese. He fought in Luino and Morazzone in 1848. In 1849 he fought in Velletri and defended the Roman Republic.

== Early years ==
Daverio was born in Varese on April 3, 1815, to the farmer Giovan Battista, and his wife, Maria Cerutti. He completed his pre-college studies in Parabiago and Varese.

In 1834, he entered University of Pavia and on January 4, 1839, he graduated with a degree in Engineering and Architecture. He worked as an engineer at the Ponti engineering studio in Varese and at the prestigious Gerli engineering studio in Milan. He also was the director and superintendent of the assets of the noble Della Sala family of Varese. He worked for Ospedale Maggiore in Milan, where he also participated in the Five Days of Milan.

== With Garibaldi ==
Daverio's first meeting with Garibaldi took place on August 13, 1848, at Castelletto sopra Ticino. Garibaldi, who had arrived in June or May via Nice and Uruguay, started the Provisional Government of Lombardy, gathering 1300 volunteers to begin an uprising in Varese.

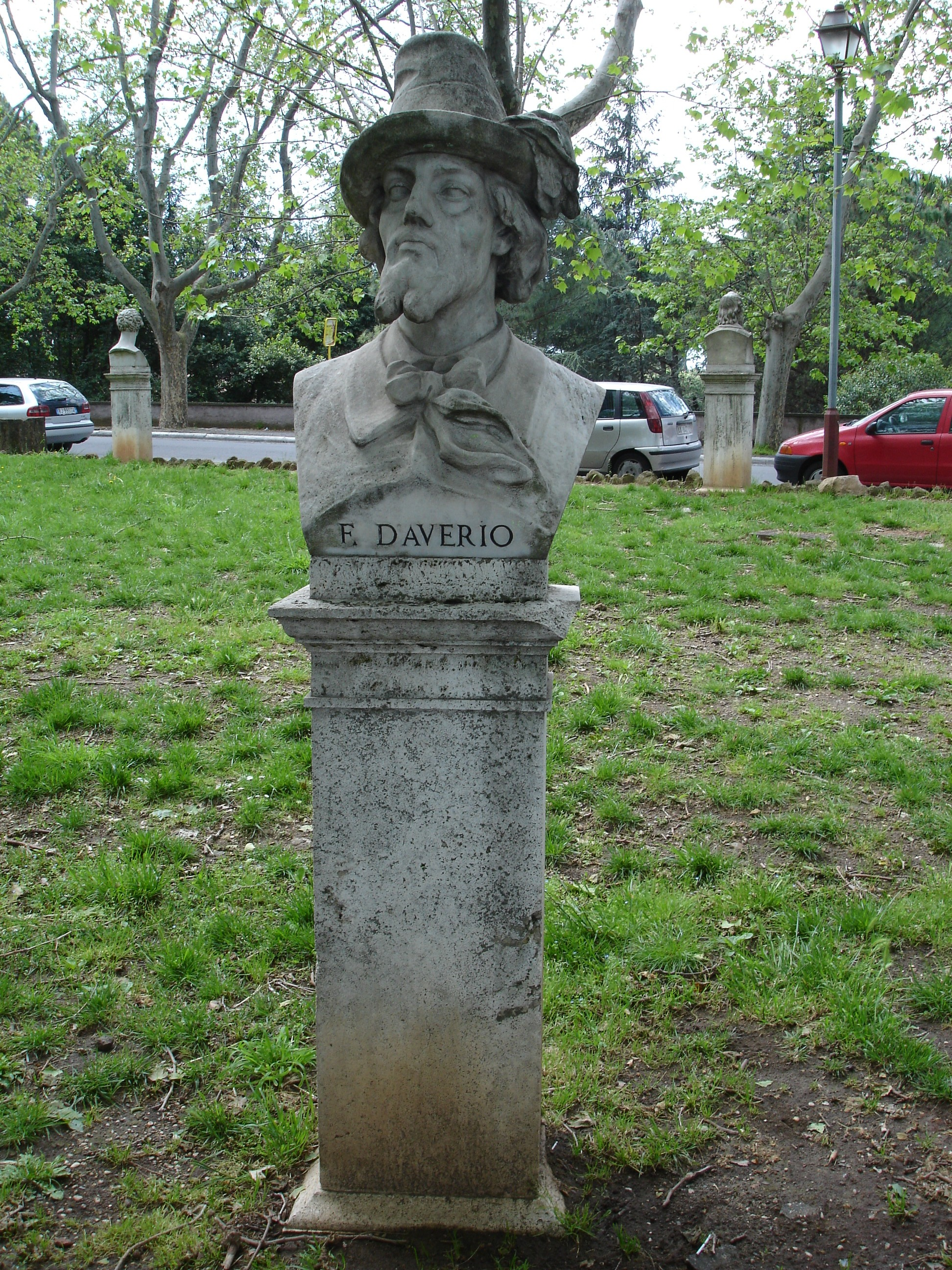
Bust of Daverio

On August 9, 1848, Austria and Piedmont had signed the Salasco Armistice, which Garibaldi found unacceptable. Garibaldi was waiting for aid from Switzerland; Mazzini had promised him guns and 180 men. Only Daverio, the 33-year-old engineer from Varese, had arrived. Mazzini had sent him as a guide.

The small army marched during the night from Castelletto sopra Ticino to Arona. Garibaldi seized the steamboats San Carlo and Verbano in the port, which had been used by the postal service on the lake. They also seized nine other boats on the lake. They lade small pieces of artillery, 1,286 rations of bread and twenty bags of rice and landed in Luino at eight o'clock in the evening of August 14 with 800 men.

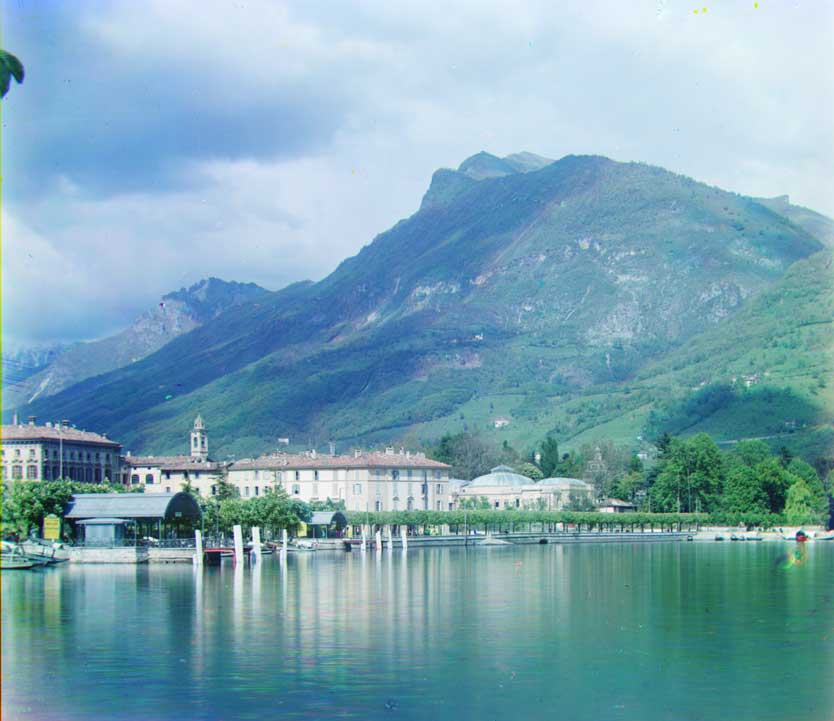
Lugano in the early 20th century

The campaign lasted fifteen days and, after the riots of Luino on August 15 and Morazzone on the 26th, revolution was in the air. Of the 800 men who had gone with him, only seventy followed Garibaldi to Switzerland. Daverio proved invaluable in guiding the retreat of the forces through the Campo dei Fiori in Brusimpiano, past the shores of Lake Lugano, and out of the country. With a long trip past Buguggiate, Capolago, Varese, Morosolo, Casciago, Velate, St. Ambrose, Bregazzana, the German Alps, and Borgnana Cavagna, the patrol arrived in the late evening of August 27 at Casamora, an isolated area between Brusimpiano and Porto.

A plaque is still visible from the road along the lake showing the house Garibaldi, exhausted from the long march, slept in. The next night, Brusimpianesi barges carried a troop thinned to about thirty volunteers, defying the Austrian gunboat patrols. Garibaldi went to Agno and then Lugano. Those who had lost him would eventually reach Switzerland in small groups. Garibaldi's volunteers were not yet ready to take Italy.

In Lugano, Daverio got in touch with his contacts from the uprising in Lombardy. After the riots started in the fall in Val d'Intelvi, he left Locarno on October 31 and landed in Germignaga, on the Lombardy side of Lake Maggiore, where it reaches Luino. He was greeted by the giunta nazionale d’insurrezione. Two Austrian columns rushed from Varese, the uprising failed, and Daverio retreated on the lake from which he came, this time destined for Piedmont.

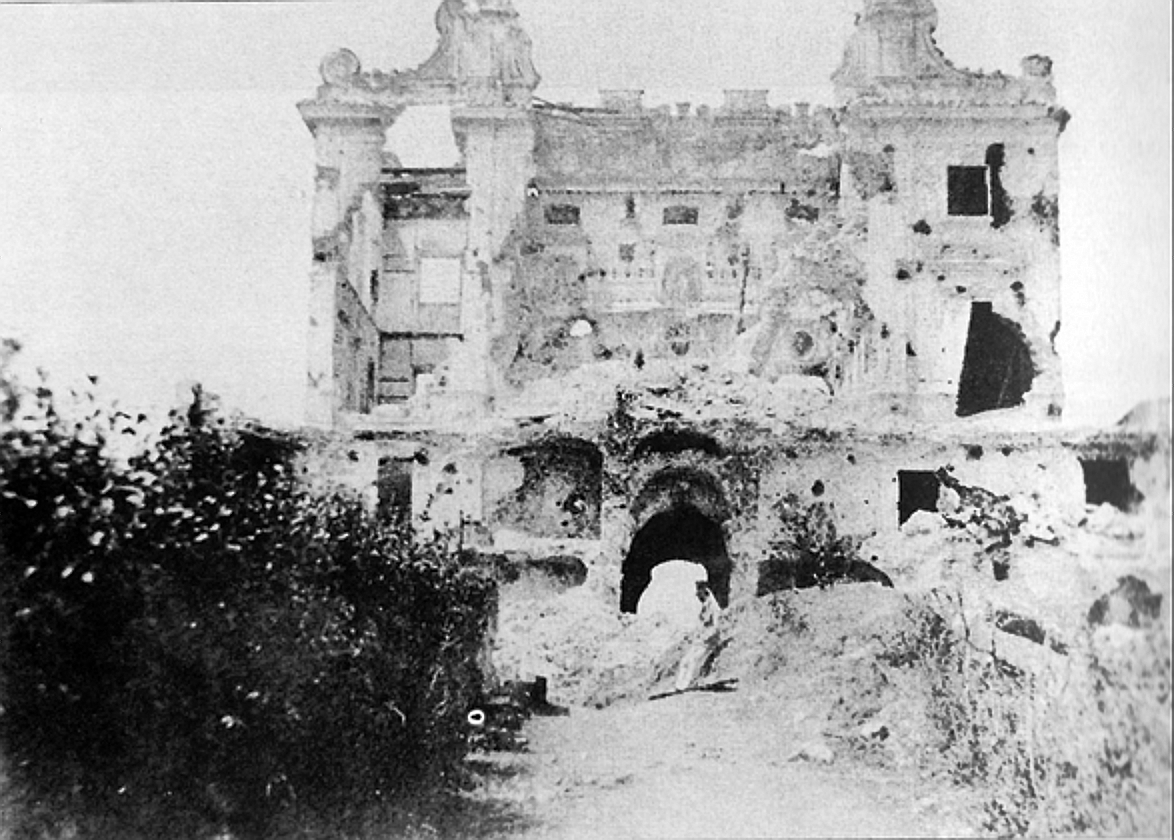
The debris of the Casino dei quattro venti after the Siege of Rome

== 1849 and death ==
In March 1849 he reappeared in Velletri. He died, defending Rome at the Casino dei quattro venti on June 3, 1849. Almost at the same time, another Varesini Enrico Dandolo died at the Palazzo Corsini. Another young patriot and Varese native, Emilio Morosini, would also die on the Janiculum in June 1849.

== Legacy ==
The Varese technical institute for surveyors is named after him. There are streets named after him in Rome, Varese, and Milan.

== See also ==
- Italian unification
- Statues and monuments of patriots on the Janiculum
