= Monument to Garibaldi (Rome) =

Monument in Trastevere, Italy

- Monumento a Garibaldi
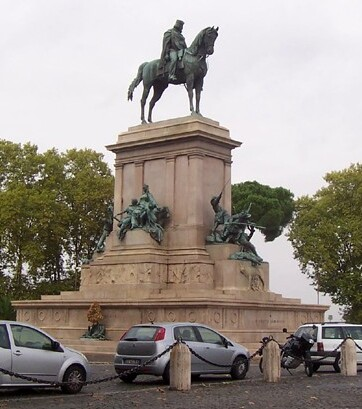
- The location of the monument today Click on the map to see marker.
- Location: Trastevere, Italy
- Coordinates: 41°53′29″N 12°27′39″E

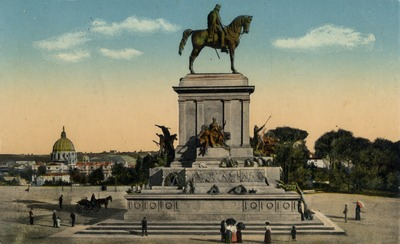
Monument to Garibaldi (Rome). Picture post card, 1910.

The monument to Giuseppe Garibaldi is an imposing equestrian statue, which is sited on the highest point of the Janiculum hill in Piazza Garibaldi.

It was designed by Emilio Gallori in 1895, and has been referred by the title "the Hero of the Two Worlds".

== History ==
The monument consists of a bronze statue portraying the hero riding a horse, which is placed on a big marble base; on each side are engraved allegorical figures of Europe and America and bas-reliefs that commemorate the landing in Marsala, the resistance of Boiada, the defence of Rome and the group of liberty. On the steps up right the monument Ettore Ferrari had created a crown, in order to remember that Garibaldi was the first Master of Italian Freemasonry. During Fascism it was replaced by fascist symbols and a copy of it was put in place only in 1943. The monument was inaugurated on September 20, 1895 by Enrico Gallori. The placement of the monument gave rise to several politic interpretations, as it was inaugurated in the period when relationships between the Kingdom of Italy and the Holy See were still suspended. The official version declared that the Hero directs his gaze to the Vatican. After the Lateran Treaty in 1929, the statue was turned around to face the city of Rome. A very popular Roman legend underlines that, in this way the horse now offers its backside to the Holy See. The monument was restored by the Municipality of Rome in 1990.

== See also ==
- Freemasonry
- Janiculum
- Monument to Giuseppe Garibaldi (Buenos Aires)
