= Emilio Gallori =

Italian sculptor

Emilio Gallori (1846–1924) was an Italian sculptor, principally of historical monuments and religious statuary.

== Biography ==
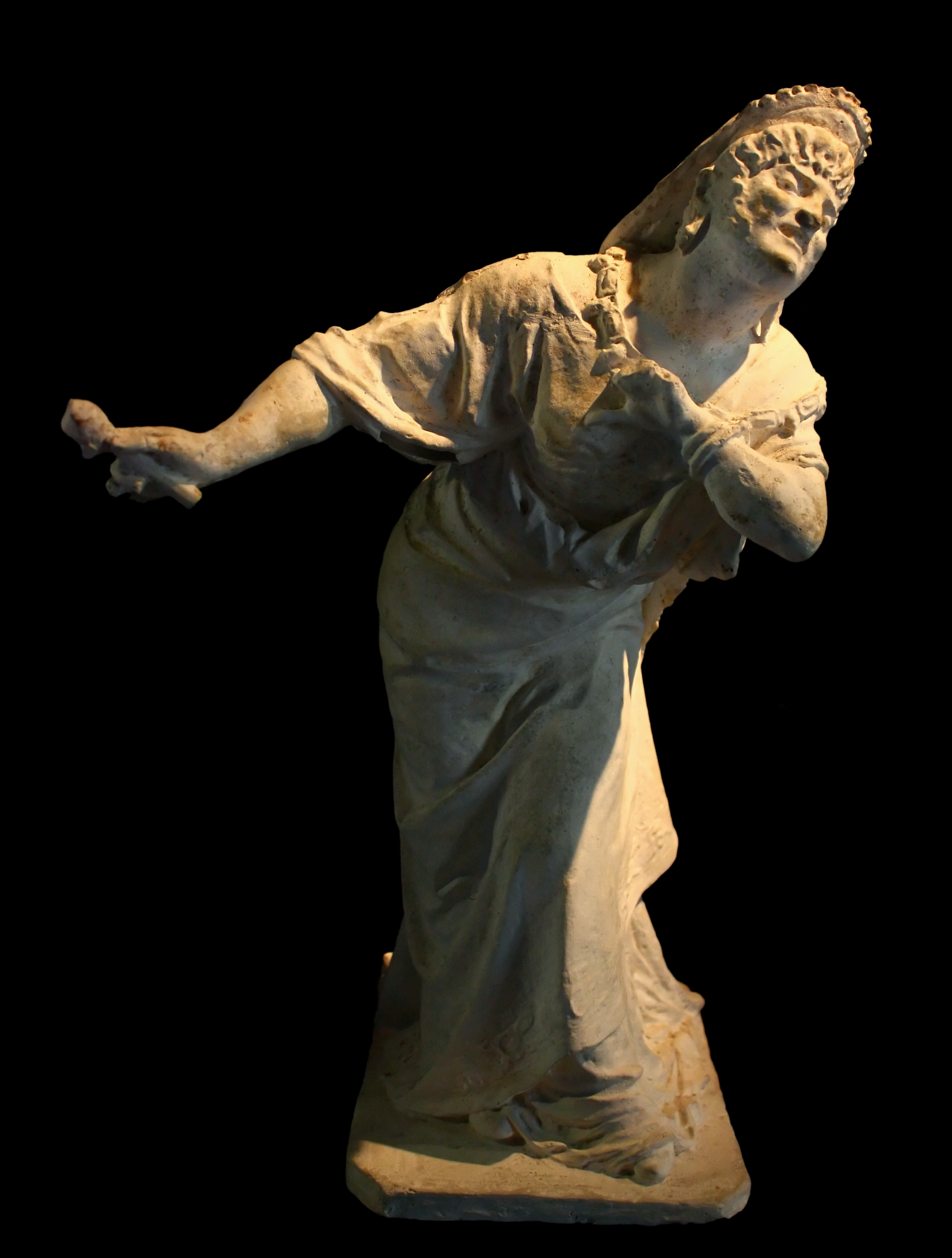
Nero dressed as a Woman

He was born in Florence and trained at the Florentine Academy of Fine Arts, where sculpture was taught by Aristodemo Costoli. In 1868 to 1872 he won a stipend to study in Rome.

Among his early works were his statue of Nero. In 1881, he exhibited at Turin a statue titled Foster-Sister. In Florence, he exhibited Fuma negli occhi (Smoke in the Eyes). In Rome, he submitted two silver prize winning models for the Monument to Vittorio Emmanuele.

Gallori designed the Monument to Metastasio which stands in the piazza in front of Santa Maria in Vallicella, Rome. He created the statue of St Peter for the facade of the Cathedral in Florence, and designed a number of Angel medallions for the facade. He created the statue of St James the Less for the exterior of the rebuilt Basilica of Saint Paul Outside the Walls.

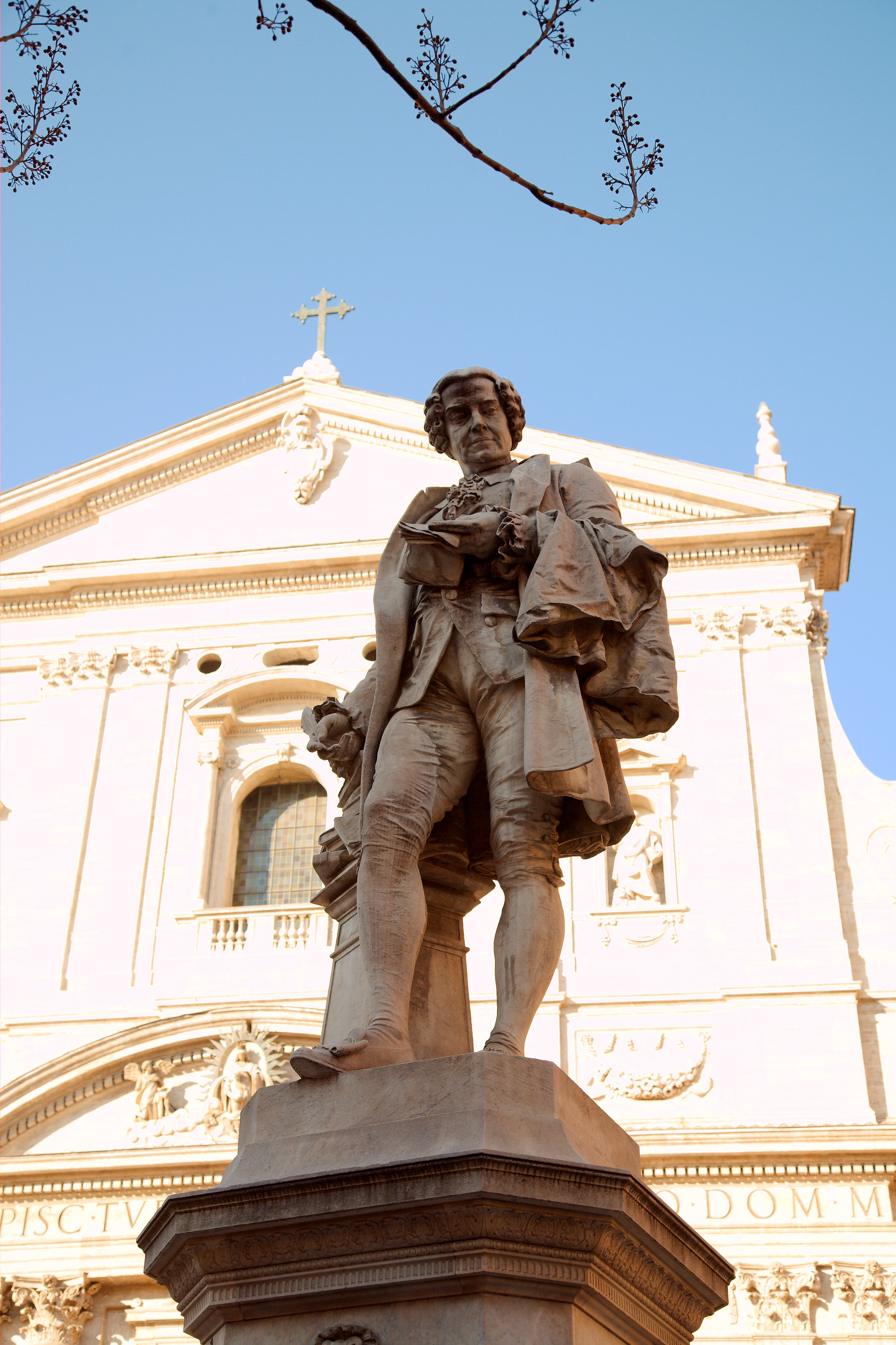
Monument to Metastasio

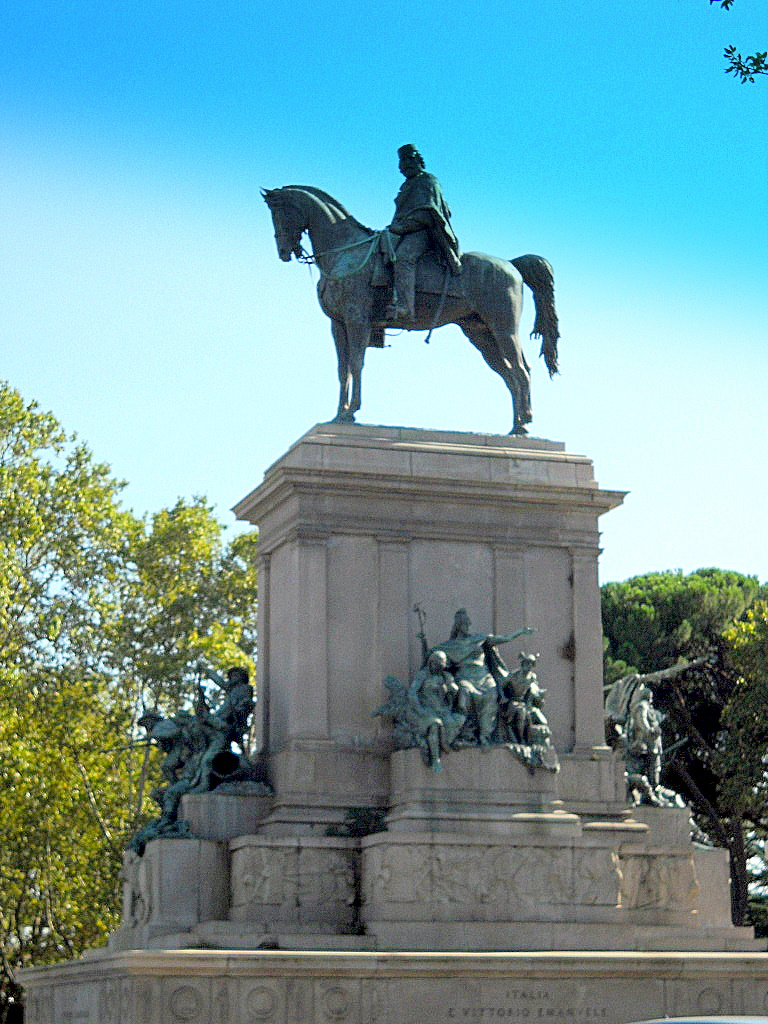
Monument to Garibaldi, Janiculum

Among his masterworks, was the design the prominent Monument to Giuseppe Garibaldi in the Janiculum of Rome, inaugurated on 20 September 1895. Gallori was responsible for the equestrian statue and the surrounding vignettes in the base. It is notable that the statue once had the horse and rider facing towards the west and the Vatican, but that the orientation was inverted in 1929.

After the death of the sculptor Enrico Chiaradia in 1902, Gallori helped bring his fellow's design to completion the project of the massive bronze equestrian statue of the king Emmanuel Vittorio II for the Altare della Patria in Rome.
