= Cispia gens =

Ancient Roman family

The gens Cispia was a plebeian family at Rome. Although the gens was supposedly of great antiquity, the Cispii only achieved prominence toward the end of the Republic.

== Origin ==
The Cispii were probably of Hernician origin, and according to tradition came from Anagnia, a town of the Hernici, during the reign of Tullus Hostilius, the third King of Rome. A certain Cispius Laevus was said to have come to the defense of Rome while the king was engaged in the siege of Veii, and stationed his forces on one of the two summits of the Esquiline Hill. At the same time, a second force stationed itself on the other summit. These were led by a certain Oppius, who had come from Tusculum. The two peaks subsequently became known as the Cispius Mons and the Oppius Mons. In Varro, the nomen is also written Cespeus.

== Praenomina ==
The praenomina used by the Cispii included Lucius, Gaius, and Marcus, all of which were amongst the most common names throughout Roman history.

== Branches and cognomina ==
The only cognomen of the Cispii is Laevus, meaning "left-handed" or "foolish". The surname may also be of Ligurian origin. Some of the Cispii are mentioned without a surname.

== Members ==
- Marcus Cispius, tribune of the plebs in 57 B.C., together with his father and brother, exerted himself to obtain Cicero's recall from banishment. He was subsequently accused of ambitus, or bribery, and although defended by Cicero, was convicted.
- Lucius Cispius, commanded part of Caesar's fleet during the African War. He may be the same person as Cispius Laevus, mentioned in a letter from Plancus to Cicero in 43 B.C.
- Cispius Laevus, a friend and legate of Lucius Munatius Plancus, who delivered confidential letters from Plancus to Cicero in 44 B.C., when Plancus was praefect of Transalpine Gaul.
- Cispius, a debtor of Cicero; it is uncertain whether he should be identified with either the tribune of 57 B.C., or with Caesar's officer.

== See also ==
- List of Roman gentes
- Cispius
