= Frances Mary Peard =

English writer and traveller

Frances Mary Peard (16 May 1835 – 5 October 1923) was an English author and traveller who wrote over 40 works of fiction for children or adults between 1867 and 1909. Most were domestic novels or short-story volumes, often historical in nature and set abroad.

== Background ==
Born in Exminster in Devon, the daughter of Commander George Shuldham Peard (1793–1837), a naval officer who went to the Arctic regions in search of Sir John Franklin, and Frances Cooke (née Ellicombe, 1805–1895), she was one of five siblings, of whom two died young. Her grandfather was Shuldham Peard and her uncle was John Whitehead Peard. Her older brother George Shuldham Peard (1829–1918) was a veteran of the Crimean War and likewise an author. With so many distinguished soldiers and sailors in her family it is not surprising that military themes and battles frequently appear in her stories. It appears that she was widely travelled, perhaps venturing as far as India, but in later life she lived in Torquay, Devon, with her mother.

== Fiction ==
Frances Peard wrote children's books for boys and girls and fiction for adults, all drawing on her travels abroad, especially in France and India. Her fiction for adults includes Unawares (1870); The Rose-Garden (1872); Thorpe Regis (1874); Cartouche (1878); Schloss and Town (1882); The Asheldon School-Room (1883); Prentice Hugh (1887); The Blue Dragon; The Interloper; The Abbot's Bridge; Donna Teresa (1899) and Number One and Number Two (1900). Her novel The Ring from Jaipur (1904) is rather more sober than its title, which suggests jewels and Far Eastern promise.

She also wrote for the Society for Promoting Christian Knowledge (SPCK) and was a friend of Christabel Rose Coleridge, Charlotte Mary Yonge and Edward Bulwer-Lytton, and in later life in Torquay of fellow novelist Anna Harriett Drury.

== Death ==
Peard died unmarried in Torquay in Devon in 1923. She left her estate of £15,276 0s 4d to her sister Helen Charlotte Peard. She is buried with her parents in the Church of St Martin of Tours, Exminster, Devon.
