= Filippo Zamboni =

Italian poet and writer (1826–1910)

Filippo Zamboni (Trieste, October 21, 1826 – Vienna, May 30, 1910) was an Italian poet and writer.

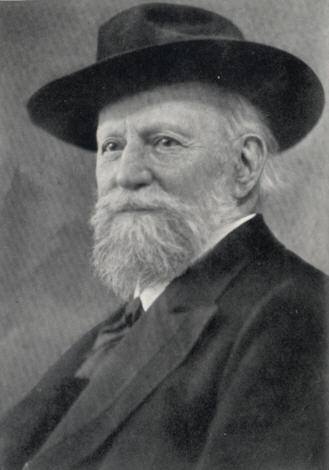
Filippo Zamboni

== Biography ==
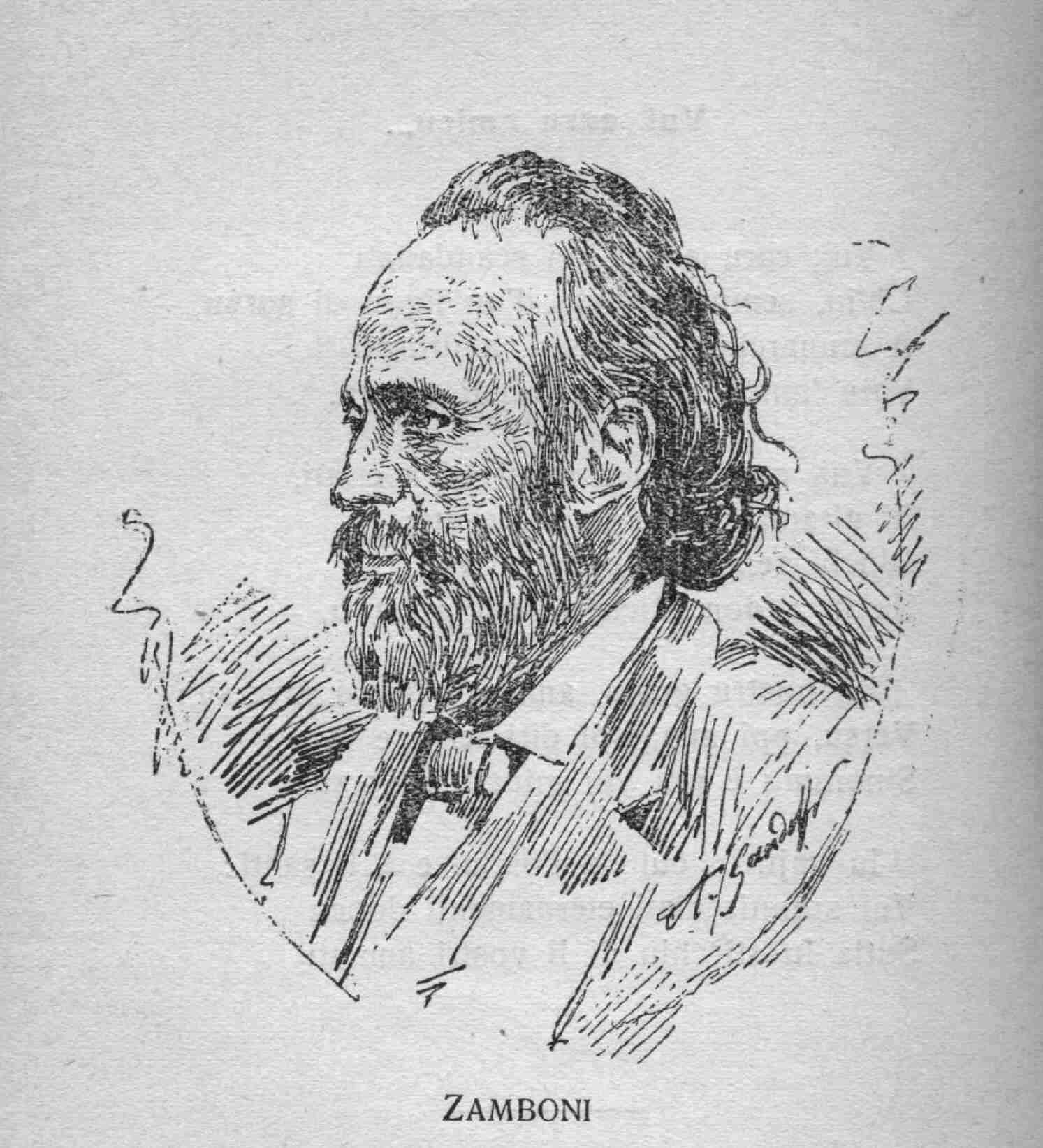
Zamboni in a painting by Antonino Gandolfo

Battaglione Universitario Romano flag

Captain of the Roman University Battalion, participated with Giovanni Veneziani and Francesco Dall'Ongaro in the defense of the Roman Republic of 1849, of which he wrote the Memoirs, published posthumously in 1926. He was the author of dramas and poems, professor of Italian literature and scholar of Dante, taught Italian students at the Academy of Vienna. He travelled to Europe, Africa and Asia. He was also interested in hypnotism and spiritualism.

A man of strong character and Mazzinian faith, he never wanted to deny his republican political conviction, which led him to remain inflexible to any act of devotion to the monarchy, suffering as a result, even as a scholar and writer, an ostracism that embittered his existence. On September 15, 1876, with a ceremony in Campidoglio, in the presence of Mayor Pietro Venturi, he donated to the City of Rome the flag of the University Battalion that he had kept after the fall of the Republic in 1849.

== Works ==
- The De profundis of General Zamboni, [S.l., s.n., after 1849].
- Italian anthology arranged by centuries, with notes in German, Vienna, R. Lechner, 1861.
- Bianca della Porta. Tragedy with historical notes, Florence, G. Molini, 1862.
- The Ezzelini, Dante and the Slaves. Historical and literary thoughts with unpublished documents, Florence, G. Molini, 1864.
- Rome in the Thousand. Dramatic poem, Florence, Le Monnier, 1875.
- Speech of Filippo Zamboni captain of the mobilized university battalion (1848–49) after the 15 September he had delivered in Campidoglio to the Municipality of Rome the ancient flag of his battalion, Bologna, Società tipografica dei Compositori, 1877.
- To the survivors of the mobilized Roman university battalion said of the tiraglioni of 1848–1849, Florence, Tip. di Salvatore Landi, [after 1879].
- Under the Flavians. Dramatic poem in nine parts, Florence, Tip. dell'arte della stampa, 1885.
- Di antichità e belle arti. Writings, Florence, Tip. of Salvatore Landi, 1889.
- Christopher Columbus in the history of humanity and universal laws, E. Sambo and C., [1894?]
- From the Karst to Trieste, [S. l., s. n., 19..?].
- The phonograph and the stars and the vision of Dante's Paradise. Sogni d'un poeta triestino, Florence, Tip. di Salvatore Landi, 1900.
- Il bacio nella Luna (The Kiss in the Moon); Pandemonio (Pandemonium); Ricordi e bizzarrie (Memories and Oddities), edited by the widow Emilia Zamboni, with a warning by Elda Gianelli, Florence, Tip. di Salvatore Landi, 1911.
- Ricordi del battaglione universitario romano (1848–1849), edited by Emilia Zamboni, preface by Ferdinando Pasini Trieste, Parnaso, 1926.

== Related articles ==
- Roman Republic (1849)
- Roman University Battalion

== Other projects ==
- Wikisource contiene una pagina dedicata a Filippo Zamboni
- Wikimedia Commons contiene immagini o altri file su Filippo Zamboni
