= John Whitehead Peard =

British soldier (1811-1880)

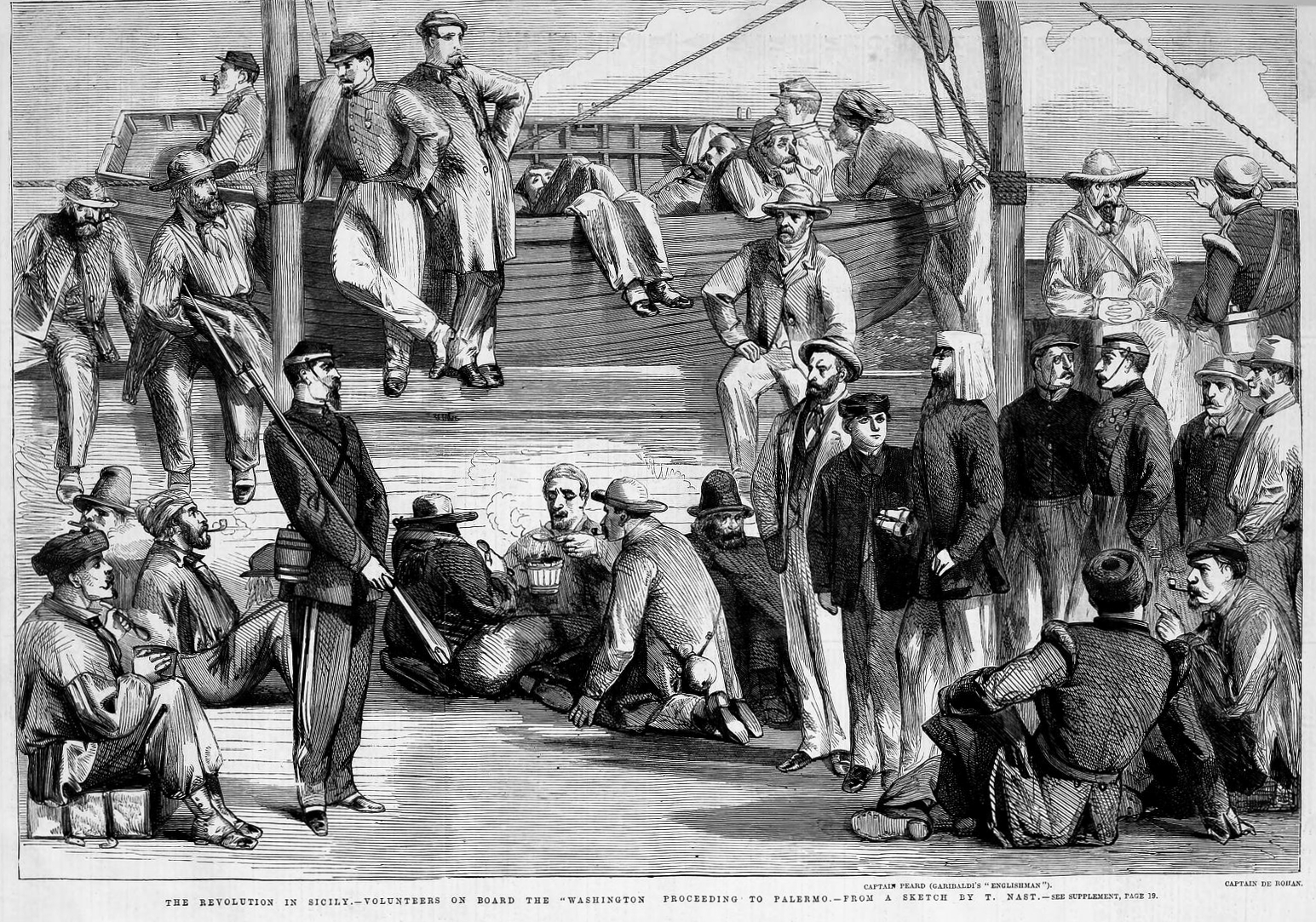
A sketch (1860)

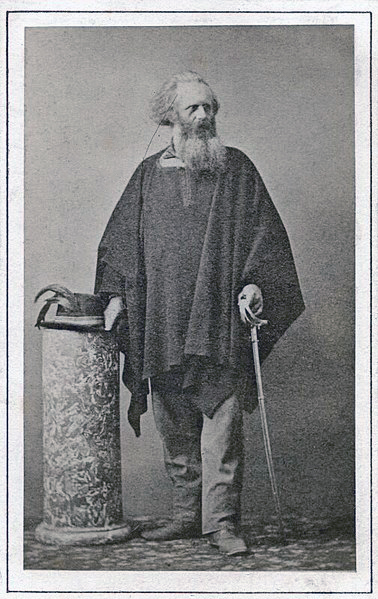
J.W. Peard circa 1860

John Whitehead Peard (1811–1880) was a British soldier, renowned as 'Garibaldi's Englishman'. He was the second son of Vice-Admiral Shuldham Peard. He was educated at Exeter College Oxford and became a barrister at law of the Inner Temple in 1837. From 1853 to 1861 he was captain in the Duke of Cornwall's Rangers. At one point of his life he lived in Penquite, a manor house in rural Cornwall, near Golant on the River Fowey.

The Sacramento Daily Union wrote, "Peard accompanied Garibaldi through several of his campaigns, and was warmly thanked for his services by the great Italian. He wrote some letters on the campaign and excited some indignation by his description of the way in which he "potted" the Austrian Generals and other officers with his rifle.

He had an important role in 1860 during the Expedition of the thousand, where he acted as Garibaldi's "double", bewildering the enemy's headquarters, causing the retreat of the enemy from Salerno and later from Naples.

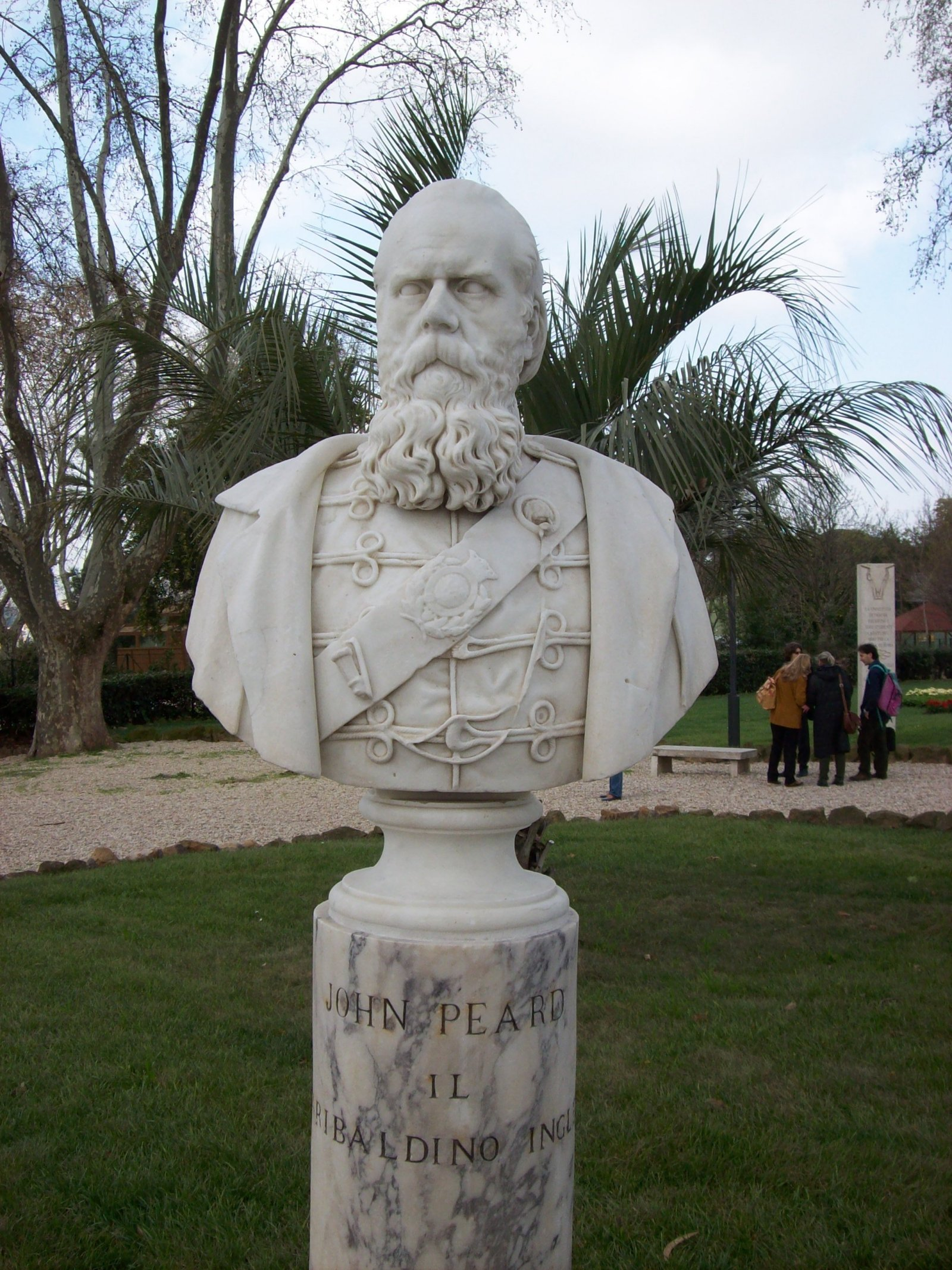
John Peard - Garibaldi's Englishman in Rome Janiculum

After the landing in Naples on 15 October 1860 of the volunteers of the British Legion he was their commanding officer.

The importance of Peard during the Expedition was awarded by king Victor Emmanuel II with the cross of the Order of Valour and Peard was known in England as "Garibaldi’s Englishman", in Rome at the Janiculum, a marble bust is present amid the Statues and monuments of patriots on the Janiculum: John Peard, "Il garibaldino inglese".

His reputation among the Britons under his command, however, suffered, with one describing him as a "bloodthirsty man, who, unable to gratify his penchant for murders in his own country, comes out here and gloats over his victims".

When Garibaldi finally retired to Caprera, Colonel Peard, who was the second son of Admiral Peard, returned to his native county of Cornwall, where he became High Sheriff and Colonel of Volunteers."

His niece was the novelist Frances Mary Peard.
