= Shuldham Peard =

Vice-Admiral Shuldham Peard
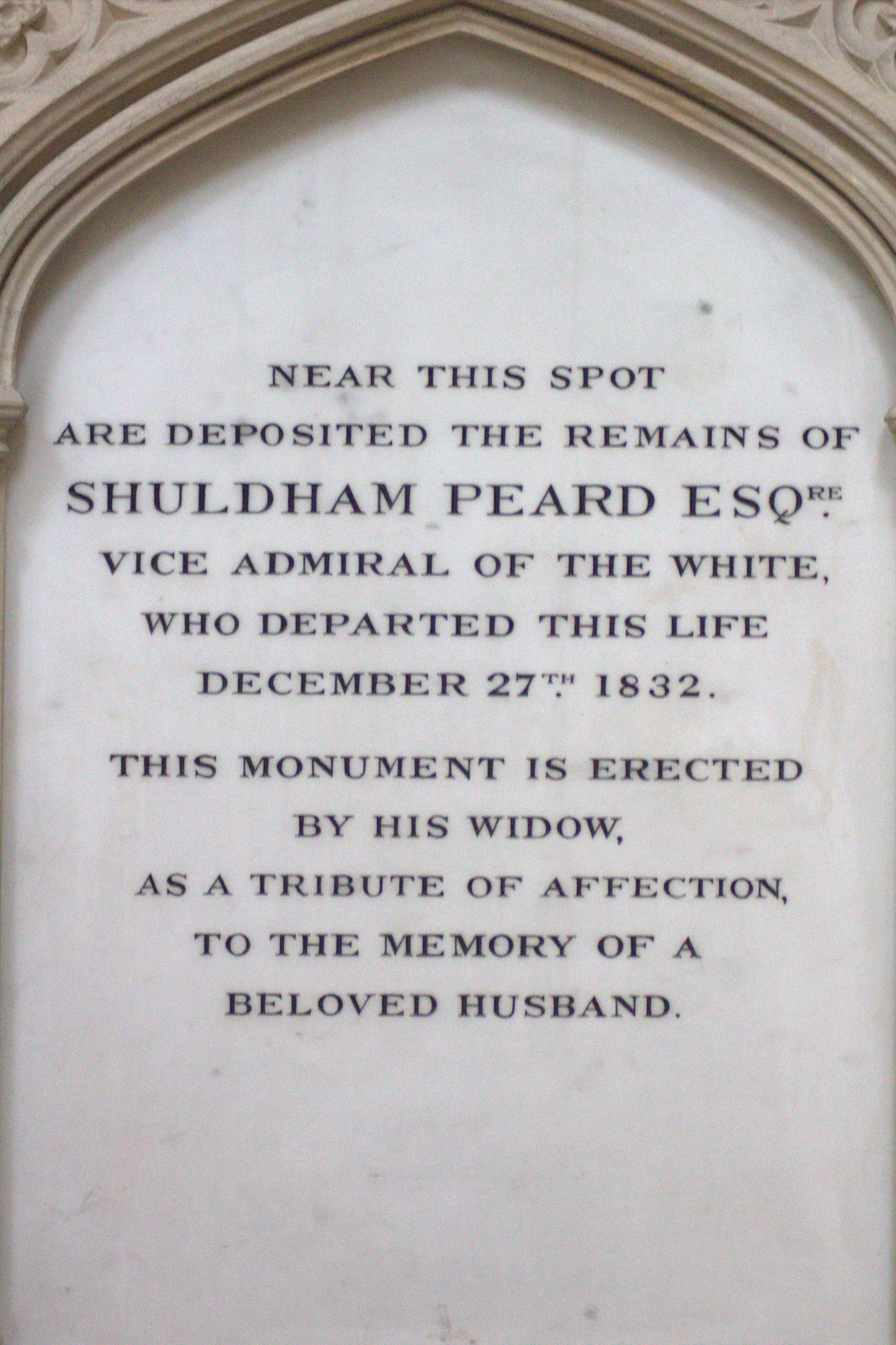
- Memorial to Shuldham Peard, in Exeter Cathedral
- Born: 1761; Penryn, Cornwall
- Died: 27 December 1832; Barton Place, near Exeter
- Burial place: Exeter Cathedral
- Relatives: John Whitehead Peard (son)
- Military career
- Allegiance: United Kingdom of Great Britain and Ireland
- Branch: Royal Navy
- Service years: 1771 (de facto from 1776) – 1832
- Rank: Vice-Admiral
- Commands: HMS Fleche; HMS Censeur; HMS Britannia; HMS St George; HMS Success; HMS Audacious
- Conflicts: American Revolutionary War; Relief of Gibraltar; French Revolutionary Wars; Blockade of Malta; Battle of the Malta Convoy; Battle of Algeciras Bay; Napoleonic Wars

Shuldham Peard (1761 – 27 December 1832) was an officer of the Royal Navy. He rose to the rank of vice-admiral after seeing service in the American War of Independence, and the French Revolutionary and Napoleonic Wars. He was the father of John Whitehead Peard, who was known as 'Garibaldi's Englishman'.

== Family and early life ==
Shuldham Peard was born at Penryn, Cornwall in 1761, the third son of Captain George Peard. Shuldham was baptised at St Gluvias on 29 October. At the age of ten he was entered on the books of HMS Fly, and afterwards on those of HMS Racehorse, as an able seaman. He probably first went afloat in 1776, in the 64-gun HMS Worcester, with Captain Mark Robinson; he was afterwards in HMS Martin with Captain William Parker, and in HMS Thetis with Captain John Gell on the Newfoundland Station. In 1779, having been sent away in command of a prize, he was taken prisoner and carried into Cádiz. On his return to England he passed his examination on 6 April 1780, and on 26 April was promoted to the rank of lieutenant. In June 1780 he was appointed to the 74-gun HMS Edgar, one of the ships of the Channel Fleet, and continued in her until February 1782, taking part in the relief of Gibraltar in April 1781. From 1785 to 1790 he was in the 74-gun HMS Carnatic, the guardship at Plymouth; in 1790–1, during the Spanish armament, he was in HMS Princess Royal, flagship of Rear-Admiral William Hotham, at Portsmouth, and was again in the Carnatic in 1791–2. In January 1793, after the outbreak of the French Revolutionary Wars he joined Hotham's new flagship, the 100-gun HMS Britannia, and went out to the Mediterranean with him. On 30 January 1795 Peard was promoted to command the sloop HMS Fleche.

== Command ==
On 5 May he was posted to HMS Censeur, and in July was appointed to the Britannia as second captain. From her, in January 1796, he was moved into the 98-gun HMS St George, which he still commanded on 18 January 1797, when, as the fleet was leaving Lisbon, she ran aground, had to cut away her masts, and was left behind disabled, while the fleet went on to fight the battle of Cape St. Vincent. The ship afterwards rejoined the flag off Cádiz, and was still there in the beginning of July, when a violent mutiny broke out on board. Peard, with his own hands, assisted by the first lieutenant, seized two of the ringleaders, dragged them out of the crowd, and had them put in irons. His daring and resolute conduct struck terror into the rest, and they returned to their duty; but the two men were promptly tried, convicted, and hanged on 8–9 July. Of Peard's conduct on this occasion St. Vincent thought very highly, and many years afterwards wrote, 'his merit in facing the mutiny on board the St. George ought never to be forgotten or unrewarded'.

In March 1799 Peard commissioned the frigate HMS Success for the Mediterranean, and on his way out, when off Lisbon, fell in with and was chased by the Brest fleet. He, however, made good his escape, and joined Lord Keith off Cádiz on 3 May, in time to warn him of the approaching danger. In the following February the Success formed part of the squadron employed in the blockade of Malta, and on the 18th, at the Battle of the Malta Convoy, had a large share in the capture of the Généreux, hampering her movements as she tried to escape, and raking her several times. On 9 February 1801 the Success was lying at Gibraltar, when a strong French squadron, under Rear-Admiral Honoré Ganteaume, passed through the Straits of Gibraltar. Peard conjectured—as was the fact—that they were bound for Egypt, and thinking that Keith ought to have warning of their presence in the Mediterranean, he immediately followed, hoping to pass them on the way. He fell in with them off Cape Gata, but was prevented by calms and variable winds from passing, and, after a chase of three days, was overtaken and captured. From the prisoners Ganteaume learned that the route to Egypt might be full of danger to himself, and turned aside to Toulon, whence Peard and his men were at once sent in a cartel to Port Mahon. On his return to England he was appointed in June to HMS Audacious, in which he joined the squadron at Gibraltar under Sir James Saumarez, and took part in the actions at Algeciras on 6 July, and in the Straits on the night of the 12th. The Audacious was afterwards sent to the West Indies, and was paid off in October 1802. In 1803 and during the Napoleonic Wars Peard commanded the sea fencibles on the coast of Cornwall.

== Flag rank and later life ==
On 5 July 1814 he was superannuated as a rear-admiral, but was restored to the active list on 5 July 1827, advanced to be vice-admiral on 22 July 1830, and died at Barton Place, near Exeter, on 27 December 1832. He married Elizabeth Bligh, the daughter of Sir Richard Rodney Bligh, whom he divorced for adultery. Together they had one son, George, who died, a captain in the navy, in 1837; he remarried and had a second son John Whitehead, became famous as "Garibaldi's Englishman". His granddaughter was the novelist Frances Mary Peard.
