= Cispius =

Cispius is the nomen of the Roman gens Cispia.

== Cispius Laevus ==
The Mons Cispius, or Cispian Hill, is one of several summits of the Esquiline Hill in Rome. The grammarian Festus says that it was named for a Cispius Laevus of Anagnia, of the Publilia voting tribe (tribus). This Cispius may be legendary.

== Marcus Cispius ==
Marcus Cispius was a tribune of the plebs in 57 BC, and was among those tribunes who actively supported Cicero in his efforts to overturn the legislation that brought about his exile. Earlier, however, Cicero had brought a civil suit in which he spoke against Cispius, his brother, and their father. Sometime after Cispius's tribunate, most likely in early 56, he was defended by Cicero on a charge of electoral corruption (ambitus) and convicted. Cicero calls him "a man of character and principle." The two men maintained their friendship in the 50s; in 55, Cicero wrote a letter of recommendation to the proconsul of Africa, Q. Valerius Orca, on behalf of men associated with Cispius. Cispius may have been a praetor sometime after 54.

== Lucius Cispius (Laevus) ==
Lucius Cispius, probably with the cognomen Laevus, was a commander of the fleet (praefectus classis) in 46 BC, serving under Julius Caesar. He took part in the blockade of Thapsus. Cispius was not of senatorial rank, and has been tentatively linked to a pottery manufacturing family in Arretium. It is possible that he was the son of Marcus Cispius (above), though this filiation would place them on opposite sides in the civil war. In 43, a Cispius Laevus was a legate of Munatius Plancus, carrying dispatches to Rome for him; this man was most likely Caesar's naval commander.

== See also ==
- Cispia (gens)
