= Janiculum =

Hill in western Rome, Italy

Coordinates: 41°53′30″N 12°27′40″E

- Hill of Rome
- Latin name: Ianiculum
- Italian name: Gianicolo
- Rione: Trastevere
- Buildings: Academia de España in Rome, American Academy in Rome, Acqua Paola, Water Mill (site)
- Churches: San Pietro in Montorio, San Pancrazio
- Events: 1849 battle
- Ancient Roman religion: augurs
- Mythological figures: Janus

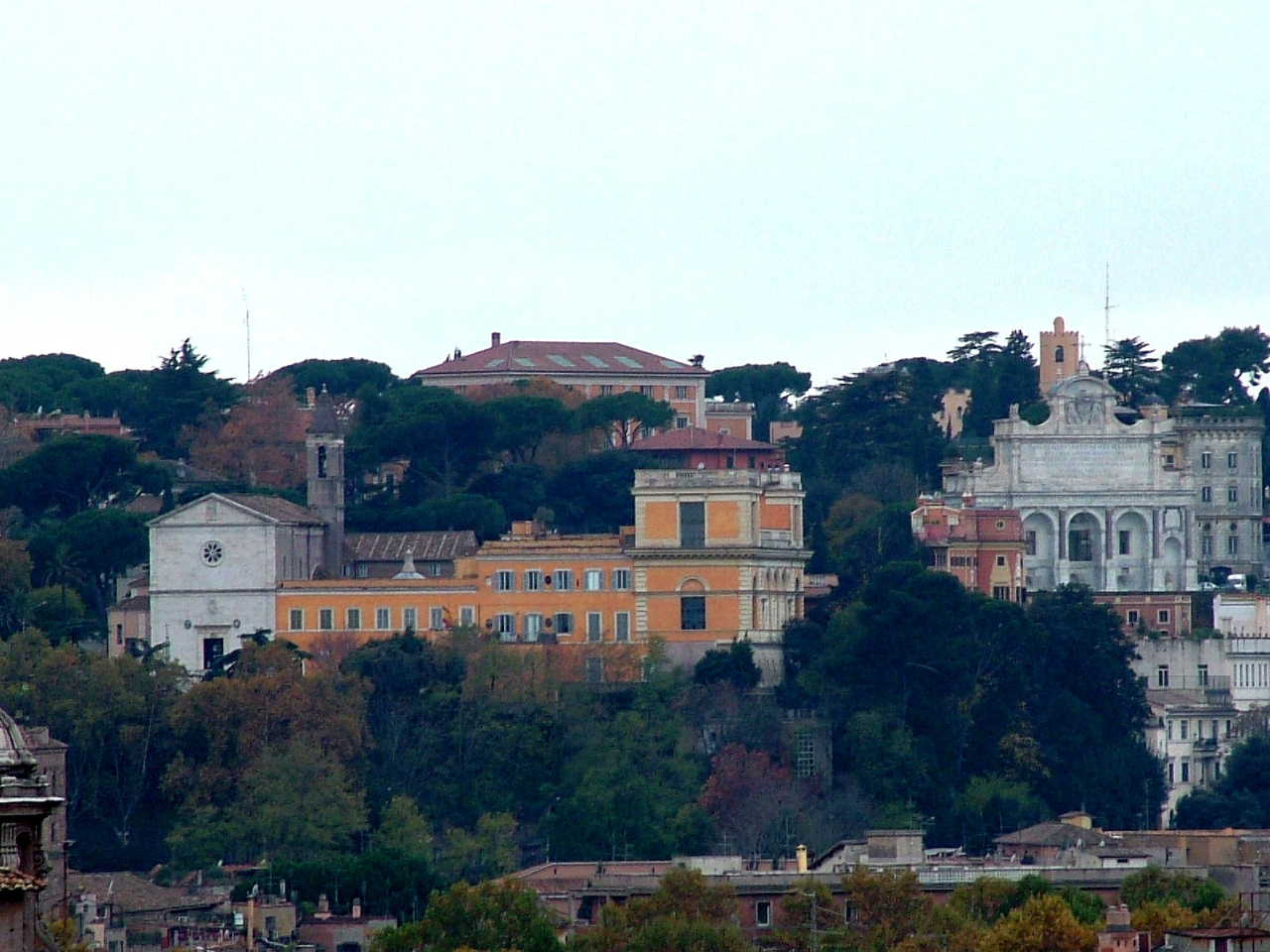
The Janiculum Hill seen from NE. At lower left, the church of San Pietro in Montorio. At lower center, the Academia de España in Rome. At middle right, the Acqua Paola. At top center, the roof of the American Academy in Rome.

The Janiculum (/dʒəˈnɪkjʊləm/ jə-NIK-yuu-ləm; Italian: Gianicolo [dʒaˈniːkolo]), occasionally known as the Janiculan Hill, is a hill in western Rome, Italy. Although it is the second-tallest hill (the tallest being Monte Mario) in the contemporary city of Rome, the Janiculum is not considered among the proverbial Seven Hills of Rome, as it is west of the Tiber river and outside the boundaries of the ancient city.

== Sights ==
The Janiculum is one of the best locations for a scenic view of central Rome with its domes and bell towers. Other sights on the Janiculum include the church of San Pietro in Montorio, on what was formerly thought to be the site of St Peter's crucifixion. A small shrine known as the Tempietto, designed by Donato Bramante, marks the supposed site of Peter's death. The Janiculum also houses a Baroque fountain built by Pope Paul V in the late 17th century, the Fontana dell'Acqua Paola, and several foreign research institutions, including the American and Spanish Academies in Rome. The Hill is also the location of The American University of Rome, Pontifical Urban University, and Pontifical North American College, as well as the Orto Botanico dell'Università di Roma "La Sapienza" and the Palazzo Montorio, residence of the Ambassadors of Spain.

The Villa Lante al Gianicolo by Giulio Romano (1520–21) is an important early building by the Mannerist master, also with magnificent views.

== History ==
=== Ancient history and mythology ===
The Janiculum was a center for the cult of the god Janus. Its position overlooking the city made it a good place for augurs to observe the auspices.

In Roman mythology, Janiculum is the name of an ancient town founded by the god Janus (the two-faced god of beginnings). In Book VIII of the Aeneid by Virgil (Publius Vergilius Maro), King Evander shows Aeneas (the Trojan hero of this epic poem) the ruins of Saturnia and Janiculum on the Capitoline Hill near the Arcadian city of Pallanteum (the future site of Rome) (see line 54, Bk. 8). Virgil uses these ruins to stress the significance of the Capitoline Hill as the religious center of Rome.

According to Livy, the Janiculum was incorporated into ancient Rome during the time of king Ancus Marcius to prevent an enemy from occupying it. It was fortified by a wall, and a bridge was built across the Tiber to join it to the rest of the city.

During the war between Rome and Clusium in 508 BC, it is said that the forces of Lars Porsena occupied the Janiculum and laid siege to Rome.

=== The water mills ===
During the third century AD, a complex of water-mills was built here to grind grain to provide bread flour for the city. As revealed by excavations in the 1990s under the present American Academy in Rome, they sat astride the aqueduct Aqua Traiana and were in brick-faced concrete with a cocciopesto floor. In the limited excavated area, two mill races branched obliquely off the Aqua Traiana, turned to run parallel to the aqueduct for some distance, and then turned back to feed into the aqueduct again. It appeared that the northern mill race had 3 or 4 millwheels of 2.30 m diameter and width about 1.65 m to provide a sufficiently large working area, but only 2.6 m between their axle centres, which must have reduced efficiency due to turbulence between them. The southern race had one larger wheel.

The site resembles Barbegal, although the excavations show that they were undershot rather than overshot in design (i. e. with the stream entering at the bottom of the wheel, not the top). The mills were still in use in 537, when the Goths besieging the city cut off their water supply, the Aqua Traiana. They were later restored and may have remained in operation until at least the time of Pope Gregory IV (827–844).

The Aurelian Walls were continued up the hill by the emperor Aurelian (reigned AD 270–275) to include the water mills.

The mills were already known from observations by R. Lanciani in the 1880s.

=== 19th century to present ===
The Janiculum is the site of a battle in 1849 between the forces of Garibaldi, defending the revolutionary Roman Republic, and French forces, who were fighting to restore the temporal power of the Pope over Rome. Several monuments to Garibaldi and to the fallen in the wars of Italian independence are on the Janiculum.

Daily at noon, a cannon fires once from the Janiculum in the direction of the Tiber as a time signal. This tradition goes back to December 1847, when the cannon of the Castel Sant'Angelo gave the sign to the surrounding belltowers to start ringing at midday. In 1904, the ritual was transferred to the Janiculum and continued until 1939. On 21 April 1959, popular appeal convinced the Commune of Rome to resume the tradition after a twenty-year interruption.

The hill is featured in the third section of Ottorino Respighi's tone poem Pines of Rome.

== Monuments ==
The crest of the Janiculum is dominated by the 1895 equestrian Monument to Garibaldi, designed by Italian sculptor Emilio Gallori. This site was chosen for its proximity to the Villa Doria Pamphili, where Garibaldi mounted a military defense of the short-lived Roman Republic in late April 1849.

The hill also features a number of statues and monuments of prominent Italians. A 2011 guide published by the local Associazione Amilcare Cipriani group, after an extensive restoration of these monuments, lists a total of 84 busts on the hill.

== See also ==
- Seven hills of Rome
- Aventine Hill (Aventino)
- Caelian Hill (Celio)
- Capitoline Hill (Capitolino)
- Cispian Hill (Cispio)
- Esquiline Hill (Esquilino)
- Monte Mario
- Mons Sacer
- Oppian Hill (Oppio)
- Palatine Hill (Palatino)
- Palazzolo
- Pincian Hill (Pincio)
- Quirinal Hill (Quirinale)
- Romanian Pontifical College
- Vatican Hill (Vaticano)
- Velian Hill (Velia)
- Viminal Hill (Viminale)
