= Giuseppe Trabacchi =

Italian sculptor

Giuseppe Trabacchi (Rome, 1839 – 1909) was an Italian sculptor.

His principal works are: high relief sent in 1861 to Italian Exposition in Florence, depicting: Il primo parto; two funereal monuments for the church of Sant'Agostino, Rome, commissioned by professor Francesco Ratti; two life-size marble statues, depicting: L' Architettura e L'Arte Industriale completed for the Commune of Rome; a statuette depicting: L' Ascolta, in bronze, acquired in 1881 by the Ministry of Public Education; San Matteo, one of twelve statues that decorated the Basilica of Saint Paul Outside the Walls in Rome; the statue of San Luigi Gonzaga for the church of Santa Teresa, Rome; a life-size marble statue of Bathsheba, exhibited in 1888 at London; two funereal monuments commissioned by signori Rosi and De-Zeo of Bracciano, and a design of a monument to Benito Juarez, completed along with his long-term collaborator and sculptor Adalberto Cencetti.
