= Ussita =

- Comune
- Comune di Ussita
- Location within Italy Location within Marche
- Coordinates: 42°57′N 13°8′E
- Country: Italy
- Region: Marche
- Province: Macerata (MC)
- Frazioni: Calcara, Capovallazza, Casali, Castel Fantellino, Cuore di Sorbo, Fluminata, Frontignano, Pian dell'Arco, Pieve, Sammerlano, San Placido, Sant'Eusebio, Sasso, Sorbo, Tempori, Vallazza, Vallestretta

Government
  - Mayor: Vincenzo Marini Marini

Area
  - Total: 55.3 km^{2} (21.4 sq mi)
- Elevation: 744 m (2,441 ft)

Population (30 November 2016)
  - Total: 446
  - Density: 8.07/km^{2} (20.9/sq mi)
- Demonym: Ussitani
- Time zone: UTC+1 (CET)
  - Summer (DST): UTC+2 (CEST)
- Postal code: 62039
- Dialing code: 0737
- Website: Official website

Ùssita is a comune (municipality) in the Province of Macerata in the Italian region Marche, located about 80 kilometres (50 mi) southwest of Ancona and about 45 kilometres (28 mi) southwest of Macerata.

The communal seat is in the frazione of Fluminata.

== Main sights ==
- Castle, now in ruins including a 14th-century tower
- Santa Maria Assunta: 14th century parish church
- Sant'Antonio da Padova
- Sant'Ercolano: 13th century Chiesetta
- Santa Lucia di Sasso: 15th-17th centuries
- Santi Vincenzo e Anastasio: 14th century
- Santa Reparata: 20th century
- San Stefano: 13th century
- Sant'Andrea Apostolo: 15th - 17th centuries
