= Ufa-Pavillon am Nollendorfplatz =

Cinema in Berlin, Germany

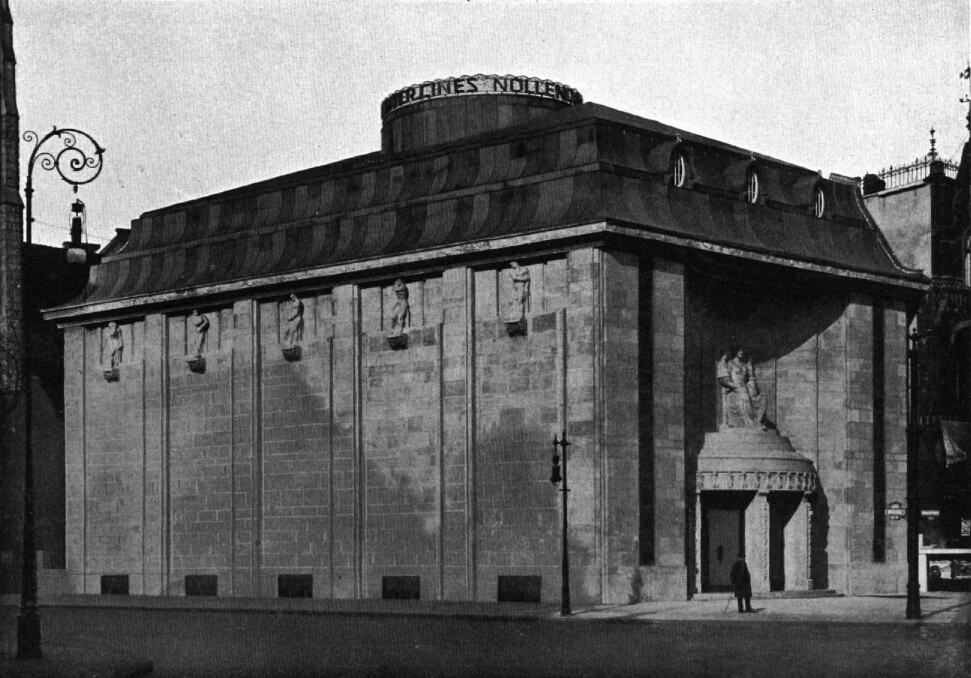
Cines Nollendorf-Theater c. 1914. The architect was Oskar Kaufmann, and the seated figure above the entrance and the bas-reliefs of the frieze on the Motzstraße side are by Franz Metzner.

The Ufa-Pavillon am Nollendorfplatz was a cinema located at 4 Nollendorfplatz, Schöneberg, Berlin. The chief architect was Oskar Kaufmann. Built in 1912–13 and decorated by leading artistic practitioners of the day, it was the German capital's first purpose-built, free-standing cinema (Note: "Das erste freistehende Kinotheater war das Cines am Nollendorfplatz in Berlin, erbaut von Oskar Kaufmann ca. 1910–12 mit 678 Plätzen. (vgl. Boeger 1993: 9, Brauns 2007: 242, Gabler 1950: 6) Source: Kießling, Maren (2014). "Bauaufgabe Kino" (in German).) (Note: The first free-standing, purpose-built cinema in Germany was the Burg Theater in Burg (bei Magdeburg), which opened as Palast-Theater on 3 June 1911, followed by the Filmtheater Weltspiegel in Cottbus, opened 4 October 1911. The Nollendorf-Theater opened 20 March 1913.) Described as "historically, [...] the most important cinema in Berlin", it incorporated a number of technical innovations such as an opening roof and a daylight projection screen, and opened as the Nollendorf-Theater in March 1913.

The cinema was built by a group of US investors allied with the Italian film company Cines (Società Italiana Cines) which included the American millionaire Joe Goldsoll (a high-class con-man and swindler); A. H. Woods, a Hungarian theatrical producer based in New York to whom Goldsoll was related by marriage; and Edward B. Kinsila, later a film studio architect. The Nollendorf-Theater was rumoured to have been "paid for by the Pope's money." (Note: "The manager [of the Nollendorf] confided to me that the company was backed by an important bank at Rome and added, as he showed off to me the marvels of his establishment: "All this kind of thing is paid for by the Pope's money. (The bank in question was, as a matter of fact, speculating with Papal funds.)" Source: (Henry 1918, pp. 215–6)) One of the directors of the parent company of Cines in Rome, was Ernesto Pacelli, President of the Banco di Roma, who was in the confidence of Pope Leo XIII and the cousin of Pope Pius XII.

Goldsoll and Woods acquired the German rights to Cines films, and formed Cines-Theater AG, a Berlin-based, partly-owned subsidiary of Cines in Rome. They also controlled a number of other important film venues in Berlin and elsewhere, including what became the Ufa-Palast am Zoo.

The cinema was renamed the Cines Nollendorf-Theater in 1914, but the Berlin subsidiary of Cines (Cines AG) collapsed in late 1915 after the Banco di Roma, one of its main investors, fell into financial difficulties. The building was acquired by the Union-Theater Lichtspiele (U.-T.) chain of cinemas, part of Paul Davidson's PAGU company. Although PAGU was consolidated in late 1917 into the Universum-Film AG (Ufa), the cinema continued to be known as the Union-Theater Nollendorfplatz until 1923. It was renamed as Ufa-Theater Nollendorfplatz in 1924 and finally as the Ufa-Pavillon in 1927. It was badly damaged during World War II in an RAF bombing raid in late 1943, and was not rebuilt.

== Design ==
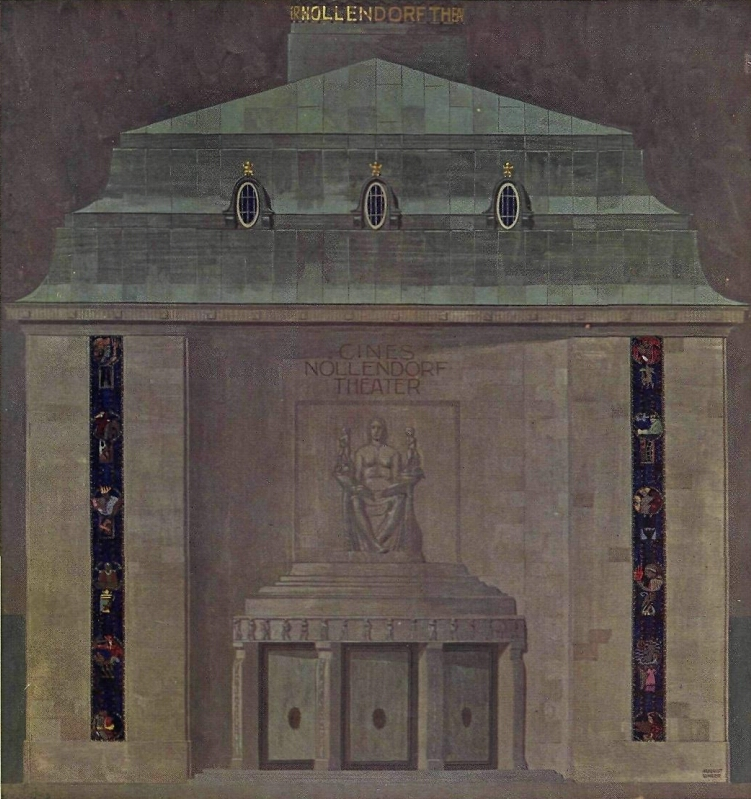
The façade of the Nollendorf-Theater cinema. 1913 drawing by August Unger, who also designed the internal décor and the curtain in the auditorium.

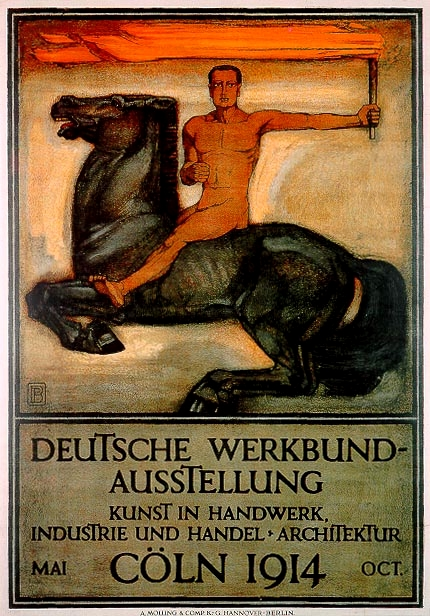
Poster for a Deutsche Werkbund exhibition in Cologne from May to October 1914, after a design by Peter Behrens

The Cines Nollendorf Theater was one of a number of buildings constructed during a brief period in Berlin's industrial and public architecture from around 1900 where Historicism (represented by the Gründerzeit and the highly decorative Jugendstil movements) came to an end, to be replaced by Modern Architecture from the early 1920s onwards.

The architect was Oskar Kaufmann, one of the proponents of the so-called 'Neuberliner' architectural style, largely influenced by the work of Alfred Messel who had died in 1909:

"In our new Berlin style—which has been cultivated by a majority of the exuberant upcoming students of Messel—the pillar that we have been lacking for so long (particularly the elongated Doric architecture) is once more finally drawn into the light of day." (Note: "In unserem Neuberliner Stil, der von dem größeren Teil der so üppig aufschießenden Messel-Schüler kultiviert wird, ist ja wieder endlich die Säule, die wir auch so lange schon vermißten, besonders die langgezogene dorische, wieder ans Tageslicht gezogen worden.")

The seated figure over the entrance and the bas-reliefs of the external frieze were by sculptor Franz Metzner, (Note: "Im Jahre 1912 folgte ein größerer Relieffries für das von Oskar Kaufmann errichtete Cines-Theater am Nollendorfplatz." Franz Metzner Also worked with Kaufmann on the Volksbühne, and with Patriz Huber on decorating Ibach pianos. Source: Alexander Koch und die Darmstädter Mathildenhöhe) and August Unger was responsible for the internal decoration. The stained glass windows in the foyer were executed by Gottfried Heinersdorff from Unger's designs: (Note: Bentinck 1975 says the windows were done by Gottfried Heinersdorff's father, Paul Gerhard Heinersdorff: but his dates (1844–1900) make it somewhat likely that Gottfried (1883–1941) was responsible.) and Georg Roch and Hermann Feuerhahn created the ceiling lights with their figurines in the auditorium.

The Nollendorf-Theater can be seen as an example of architectural 'Gesamtkunstwerk', a work created by a typical assemblage of masters of their craft found particularly in Germany (and less so in the United States). The films made by Ufa and other companies shown in the cinema during the 20s and 30s were also informed by this idea of an artistic guild of equals. (Note: Vsevolod Pudovkin, quoted by Kracauer: " "The technical manager can achieve nothing without foremen and workmen and their collective effort will lead to no good result if every collaborator limits himself only to a mechanical performance of his narrow function. Team work is that which makes every, even the most insignificant, task a part of the living work and organically connects it to the general task," Prominent German film directors shared these views and acted accordingly." This applied to the old-school thespians like Emil Jannings: " While Hollywood cultivates stars rather than ensemble effects, and the Russian cinema often uses laymen as film figures, the German film is founded upon a permanent body of players highly disciplined professionals who adjust themselves to all changes in style and fashion."(Kracauer 1947, p. 25)) This collective approach resulted in a flexible, dynamic and fluid group of artistically minded, highly creative and even visionary film-makers which produced many of the classic films which are still discussed and referenced in the 21st century. (Note: "In addition, there is no expert who would not acknowledge the organizational power operative in these films a collective discipline which accounts for the unity of narrative as well as for the perfect integration of lights, settings and actors."(Kracauer 1947, p. 4))

The architecture of the Nollendorf-Theater is plainer and more severe than the Gründerzeit and Jugendstil styles, and embodies distinctly 'modern' sculptural and artistic motifs. The overall approach seems to have some stylistic connections with Reformarchitektur and the Deutscher Werkbund, a "cultural-economic association of artists, architects, entrepreneurs/businessmen and experts", founded in 1907. (Note: 'als wirtschaftskulturelle "Vereinigung von Künstlern, Architekten, Unternehmern und Sachverständigen"...gegründet')

Other contemporary developments in search of "a more modern and useful architecture" for Berlin include: the AEG turbine plant by Peter Behrens (1909); Kaufmann's Volksbühne and the Hebbeltheater introduced new trends in theatre construction (in addition to the Ufa-Pavillon and his 1914 conversion of the Groß-Berlin Theater, later the Ufa-Palast am Zoo; the Pergamon Museum and the capital's first department stores were drafted by Alfred Messel; and Hermann Muthesius designed a new and modern Country House style for Berlin's newly developing suburbs.

== Description ==
Edward B. Kinsila in his book Modern Theater Construction gives a (fulsome, bordering on purple prose) description of the interior of the Nollendorf.

Also, from an article in the contemporary trade journal Kinotheater:

"Opposite the 'Mozartsaal' a curious building has arisen, and the gazes of the passers-by are already steered towards the exterior, with its windowless and thus distinguished, seemingly inventive, façade. The glass paintings (illuminated from the inside) which constitute a unique decoration of the entrance, bespeak—through their symbolic figures—the building's purpose: a cinema. (Note: Translated from an unidentified contemporary issue of the trade film journal Kinotheater: „Gegenüber dem ‚Mozartsaal‘ ist ein eigenartiges Gebäude entstanden, das schon von aussen durch seine fensterlose und doch vornehme, originell wirkende Fassade die Blicke der Passanten auf sich lenkt. Die von innen erleuchteten Glasmalereien, welche den einzigen Schmuck des Eingangs bilden, lassen durch ihre symbolischen Figuren die Bedeutung des Hauses erkennen: ein Kinotheater.)

At first glance the auditorium comes across as almost overwhelming. If you didn't know that it has been decked out after the American paradigm, you might suppose that you were being confronted with an entirely new style. This is something genuinely new for Berlin, and one must give Oskar Kaufmann his due, for he has understood how to bring to fruition something outstanding and appropriate to its purpose. The room, decorated in ivory colours, is completely carpeted in grey plush, against which the lilac folding seats are advantageously silhouetted. The ceiling gravitates downwards towards sumptuous, multi-coloured relief arabesques, and the light fixtures are of outstanding beauty. (Note: From Kinotheater, as above: "Der Innenraum wirkt für den ersten Augenblick beinahe überwältigend. Wer nicht weiss, dass er nach amerikanischem Muster hergerichtet ist, könnte meinen, hier einem völlig neuen Stile gegenüberzustehen. Neu ist er denn auch wirklich für Berlin und man muss es dem Architekten Oskar Kaufmann lassen, dass er es verstanden hat, etwas Hervorragendes und vor allen Dingen Zweckdienliches zu schaffen. Der in Elfenbeinfarbe gehaltene Raum ist völlig mit grauem Plüsch ausgelegt, von dem die violetten Klappsessel sich vorteilhaft abheben. Von den Decken herab ziehen sich prächtige, buntfarbige Reliefarabesken und von besonders hervorragender Schönheit sind die Beleuchtungskörper.")

The theatre contains 650 places, (Note: The online source says 850, probably a mis-transcription somewhere. A study of the architectural plan shows that there were approximately 643 seats: c500 in the stalls, c100 in the circle, and c43 in the boxes.) whose prices between 1 and 3 marks are allotted to stalls, circle and boxes. The staircase does not lead separately – like in German theatres in general – to the auditorium, but from both sides of the stalls; and (through the continuous curved arc of the balcony) generates a wholly idiosyncratic embellishment of the house. Everything is austerely modern, plain, and elegant." (Note: From Kinotheater, as above: "Das Theater zählt 850 Plätze, deren Preise sich zwischen 1 und 3 Mark bewegen und die sich auf Parkett, Rang und Logen verteilen. Die Treppe zum Rang führt nicht – wie beim deutschen Theater üblich – ausserhalb des Zuschauerraumes hinauf, sondern zu beiden Seiten des Parketts und bildet durch ihre in die Ranggalerie übergehende bogenartige Wölbung einen ganz eigenartigen Schmuck des Hauses. Alles ist streng modern, einfach und vornehm.“)

The film critic of the Berlin daily Germania (Zeitung) was much taken with the auditorium on the opening night:

"First, a word about the interior of the theatre: Adorable. Damped, effective light falls down through splendid bronze balls. The whole plain, sober and simple interior is delicately mauve -white; even the numerous ushers (Platzanweiser) are exceptional in their new violet tailcoat livery. All in all, a jewellery box of the very best kind." (Note: "Wort über das Innere des Theaters: Entzückend. Gedämpftes, wirkungsvolles Licht fällt durch prächtige Bronzekugeln verteilt hernieder. Das ganze schlicht vornehm und einfach gehaltene Innere ist in zartes violett-weiss gehalten; selbst die zahlreichen "Platzanweiser" gefallen sich ausnehmend in ihren neuen violetten Frack-Livreen. Alles in allem ein Schmuckkästchen eigenster Art.")

It was not as big as the Ufa-Palast am Zoo, which soon become Berlin's premier cinema. The Ufa-Palast was also owned/leased by Goldsoll and Woods and converted in 1913 from a stage theatre by Oskar Kaufmann. The Ufa-Pavillon was seems to have been used more for press showings.

Not so Oriental

Somewhat confusingly, 'Cines' is also a native adjective in the German language, meaning 'Chinese'. However, the Cines-Theater was not a 'Chinese theatre', as at least two writers seem to believe.

== Critical reception ==
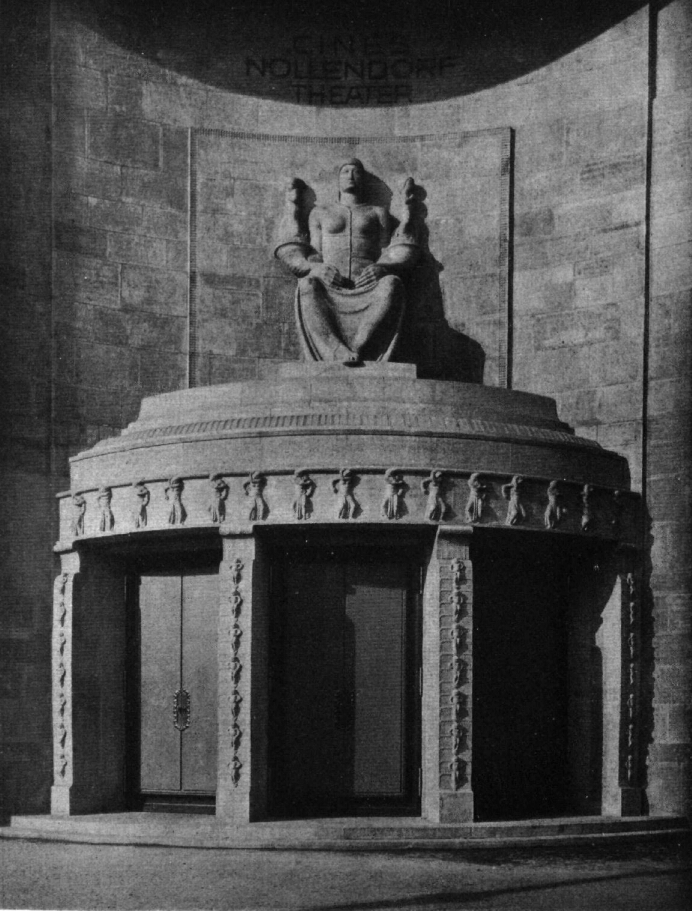
Seated figure by Franz Metzner above the main entrance of the Cines Nollendorf-Theater, c.1913. In later years it was usually hidden behind a large advertising poster.

According to one contemporary critic, the building exhibited "the gracefully ironic pathos, the erotically overloaded sacrilege, the rhythmical dissonance of solemnity and dance", which became the key formal elements of the 'Ufa style.'

"Cinema buildings are not, at any rate, slow in arriving, and take interesting forms of great experimental significance, as is the case of Oskar Kaufmann's Cines Theater, inaugurated in 1913."

Before World War I, "Germany had led the world in the development of serious, modern cinema architecture. Oskar Kauffmann's [...] Cines-Theater in Berlin's Nollendorfplatz was one of the first significant free-standing purpose-built cinema structures. It was among the first attempts at a sober, modern language of cinema architecture, presenting an austere picture to the world with three looming blank walls ".

With its somewhat detached, intellectual, high-cultural prose, Berliner Architekturwelt briefly referred to the new cinemas in Berlin, singling out the building on the Nollendorfplatz:

"We lack the space to completely register the 'cinemas'; it should at least be mentioned that the first of this type, namely the edifice built by Oscar Kaufmann on the Nollendorfplatz has been inaugurated, and the newest scintillating Muse (albeit 'Piccadillyfied' by the imbecile name of Cines), (Note: This may refer to the 'Lichtspieltheater im Piccadillyhaus' cinema within the Haus Potsdam (1911–1912). Coincidentally, this building housed the headquarters of Ufa from c1917 to 1927. Alternatively, it may refer to the illuminated signs which had recently begun to invade London's Piccadilly Circus: the words 'Cines Nollendorf Theater' appeared above the statue over the entrance.) genuinely offers an artistic home which we also think to publicise. The same artist, as is generally known, is now finishing the Theater der neuen freien Volksbühne – whose future is now assured (Note: There had been some delay in financing the theatre.) – in the Bülowplatz in Scheunenviertel, which thereby perhaps gets away from his past. (Note: "Vollends die Vermehrung der „Kientöppe" zu vermerken, fehlt es uns an Raum; erwähnt soll immerhin aber sein, daß das erste nur diesem Zweck, und zwar von Oskar Kaufmann errichtete Gebäude am Nollendorfplatz eröffnet worden ist, und der neuesten flimmernden Muse ein ernst künstlerisch gemeintes, wenn auch durch den blöden Namen Cines „verpiccadillytes" Heim bietet, das auch wir zu veröffentlichen denken. "Der gleiche Künstler schafft bekanntlich auch das nun gesicherte Theatre der neuen freien Volksbühne am Bülowplatz im Scheunenviertel, das damit vielleicht endlich von seiner Vergangenheit loskommt.") (Note: See also lengthy description (in German) in Berliner Architekturwelt. (Nachtlicht 1914, pp. 58–60))

"An early high point of the grounding phase of the film palaces was the Cines-Theater, opened in 1913, the first "free-standing building conceived solely in the interests of cinema", a "sober, grey, and particularly windowless cube." (Note: "Früher Höhepunkt der Gründungphase von Filmpaläste war das 1913 eröffneter "Cines-Theater", der erste "nur für die Belange des Kinos konziptierte freistehende Bau", ein "schlichter grauer und insbesondere fensterloser Kubus.")

== Early history ==
=== Background ===
In December 1908 a highly restrictive and monopolistic trust, the Motion Picture Patents Company (MPPC), otherwise known as the 'Edison Trust', was set up to combine the power of the major US film companies. This was particularly worrying for European film makers, since they were almost entirely excluded from the American market. They met in Paris in February 1909 to discuss sales and rental methods to get out a crisis of over-production (especially in France) and the supply of film stock (mostly made by Eastman Kodak) to the European manufacturers.

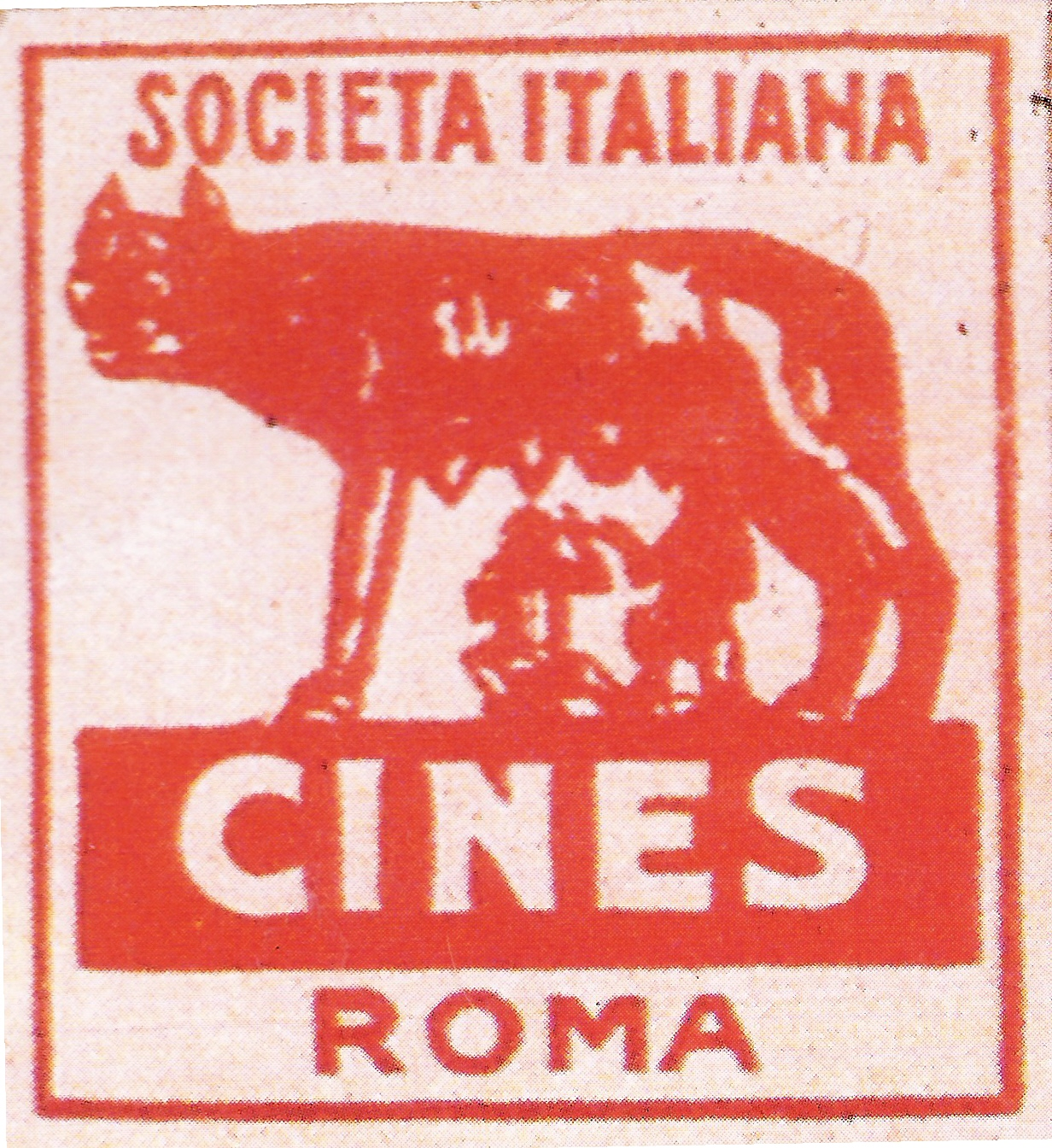
The Cines logo

Present at the meeting was a representative of Cines ('Società Italiana Cines'), an Italian film production company based in Rome. It had opened branches in London, Paris and Barcelona by 1907, and was the distributor for the Ambrosio Film production company of Turin. Cines began to expand considerably outside Italy, making preparations for an 'escalation strategy' to spend more on film productions and film portfolios. Cines had no distributor in the US at the time, and Mario A. Stevani (director general of Cines since 1910) made a trip to the USA in March–May 1911, and signed a contract with the Edison Trust (MPPC) to sell a million meters (3 million feet) of film per year. His main contact was George Kleine, a Chicago film importer and leading member of the MPPC, who made huge profits importing foreign films into the US, using his MPPC-license to acquire the films. Kleine became the distributor of Cines films in the US, (Note: Kleine and Stevani later set up the Photodrama Producing Company of Italy in March 1914. They built a new studios near Turin (HQ of Ambrosio) in 1915, but Italy's entry into the war in 1916 put a stop to everything, and the aspirations of Cines as a major European film producer were confounded.) and the Marquis di Serra (one of the directors of Cines) was appointed agent in the UK.

Cines also received an injection of capital from a group of US investors, who built or acquired cinemas in Germany and elsewhere in mainland Europe, to increase their share of the marginal cinema revenues that Cines's films generated: in 1912 the Cines company of Rome had a capital of 3.75 million lire ($712,125). Among the American investors and interested parties were: F. J. "Joe" Goldsol (later Chairman of Goldwyn Pictures from 1922 to 1924); his younger brother L. H. Goldsoll, and Edward B. Kinsila; the theatrical impresarios A. H. Woods (who invested $160,000), Klaw and Erlanger, and Charles Frohman; and Pat Casey, an experienced vaudeville agent. Goldsoll was the director and general manager of the Berlin-based company Cines-Theater AG (a partly-owned subsidiary of Cines in Rome), which held the Cines rights for Germany.

=== Construction ===
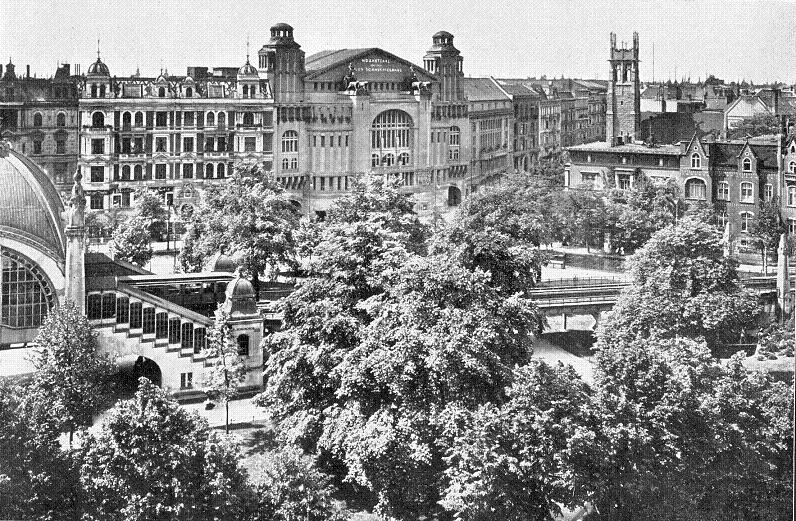
The Nollendorfplatz in 1903 before the cinema was built, with the U-Bahn station (l. foreground) and Neues Schauspielhaus (c.). The Ufa-Pavillon was built in front of the tower of the American Church in Berlin (r.)

Although its exact origins are slightly unclear, the cinema seems to have been built from mid-1912 by Joe Goldsoll, a millionaire high-class con man and swindler whose Cines-Theater AG company owned the rights to Cines films in Germany. He appears (as F. J. Goldsoll) as its owner ('Eigentümer)' in the 1913 Berlin address book. Goldsoll, as the main financial backer, was joined by A. H. Woods, a Hungarian theatrical producer based in New York, whose interest in films and cinemas seems to have begun with his involvement with the 1912 film The Miracle, produced by Joseph Menchen. Al. Woods's wife was Goldsoll's cousin.

The late owner of the previous building on the new cinema's site was Baron Rudolf von Renvers, von Bülow's doctor and confidant, who died in 1909. (Note: Other random unconnected info for flying enthusiasts: in 1910, the building next door at 3 Nollendorfplatz housed the offices of the Wright Company, the (German) Royal Aero Club with its clubhouse at Johannisthal, Germany's first air field, and Luftfahrzeug-Motorenbau GmbH (LMG) (later Maybach); and in 1911 the Motorluftschiff-Studiengesellschaft (Powered Airship Studies Company), founded in 1906 and forerunner of LMG.) The deal to build the cinema was promoted by the slightly unusual Edward B. Kinsila, at the time a London-based American property developer: he later became a cinema and film studio designer in the US.

Goldsoll, "a non-combatant in show-things", with Al. Woods and a "theatrical mob" including A. L. Erlanger, Pat Casey (Note: Casey was an experienced vaudeville agent, see Vermazen, Bruce (2004). That Moaning Saxophone : The Six Brown Brothers and the Dawning of a Musical Craze) and Charles Frohman, sailed on the RMS Mauretania for a 4- to 6-week tour of Europe on 3 April 1912.

One of the first mentions of the new cinema appeared in the Moving Picture World in October 1912:

"Projection Department: From Berlin"
Mr. Edward B. Kinsila, Nollendorf Theater, Berlin, Germany, writes:
"I am building here what I hope will be the finest cinematograph theater in the world, and naturally I want to give the very best picture. The auditorium will be lighted during the showing of the picture, and the screen placed back on a thoroughly darkened stage about 18 feet from the proscenium opening. The throw will be made through the auditorium onto the screen, a distance of about 70 feet. It is my understanding that the best light effect is produced where the amperage is high and the voltage low, or the reverse. Will you be good enough to tell me just what voltage and amperage of direct current will be the very best? I can use up to 220 volts, and any amperage I like. I have no desire to economize on the light. I want the best effect, that is all."

In December 1912 Kinsila (or Kinsella) claimed to be associated with Goldsoll in the building of the new cinema:

"Berlin's finest and newest cinematograph playhouse, the Nollendorf Theater, which is about to open its doors, is the creation and property of two Americans, the Messrs. Goldsoll and Kinsella. The building, which is like a Greek temple, is architecturally one of the most striking structures in the Kaiser's capital, and does much to beautify the big Nollendorf Platz, on which it stands.
The new theatre contains one feature which is an absolute novelty in German picture-houses, namely, that it does not require to be darkened while the films are being shown. Its domed roof is also an innovation, as it is built to be removed in summer, and during other propitious weather, so at night the spectators have nothing above them but the starlit heavens."

It was also the first cinema with a sloping floor and the seating in a fan-shaped arrangement. However, by the time the Nollendorf-Theater opened in March 1913 Kinsila seems to have left the scene, and it was being reported as the "creation and property of F. J. Goldsoll and Al. Woods."

=== Opening ===
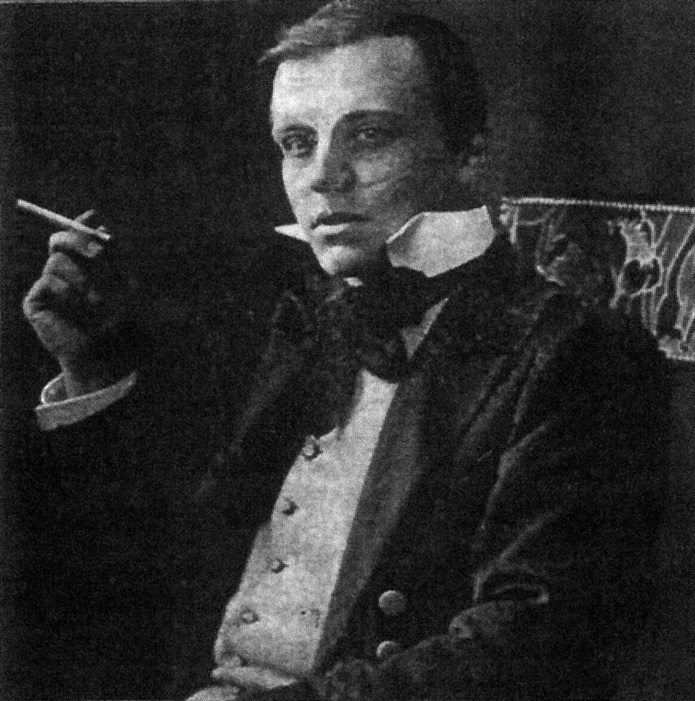
Hanns Heinz Ewers, who gave a speech at the opening night of the Nollendorf-Theater.

The inauguration on 19 March 1913 of this "palace of unheard-of luxury" made a "genuine sensation." The evening began with a dithyrambic speech in praise of the cinema (the Kintopp) by Hanns Heinz Ewers, one of the most outspoken pro-Autorenfilm literati. (Note: Ewers (pronounced Evers/Ey-vers) wrote the 1911 fantasy novel Alraune, later filmed esp. as Alraune (1928 film), and the script for The Student of Prague, shown in August 1913 at the Neues Schauspielhaus over the road. Ewers later joined the Nazi Party, and his early work has often been viewed in light of the highly selective "Kracauerian/Eisnerian dogma". "Hans Heinz Ewers [...] possessed a real film sense. He had the good fortune to be a bad author with an imagination reveling in gross sensation and sex, a natural ally for the Nazis, for whom he was to write, in 1933, the official screen play on Horst Wessel. But precisely this kind of imagination forced him into spheres rich in tangible events and sensual experiences, always good screen material.")

The main attraction, however, was the German première of the Cines blockbuster epic of Ancient Rome Quo Vadis?, to which Woods and Goldsoll controlled the German rights. Woods also owned the worldwide rights outside the US, where the rights were controlled by George Kleine. Like the presentation of the film of The Miracle in London and New York (to which Woods also owned the rights), (Note: In England during May 1912, Woods acquired the all-America rights to The Miracle, the world's first all-colour narrative feature film (which was due to be filmed in October). The record-breaking film show, accompanied by a full symphony orchestra and chorus, and also featuring live non-speaking actors dressed as nuns, ran from December 1912 to March 1913 in London. It made huge profits for its producer, Joseph Menchen, who had been involved with European Amusement Parks Limited, a syndicate which brought Luna Parks from the USA to Britain and Europe from 1908, including Luna Park, Berlin in 1910. (Note: "The Luna Park habit has struck Berlin. A big amusement enterprise similar to those in New York, London and Paris, is promised for Halensee Terraces next spring. Herr Heinrich Zeller is promoter, but the power behind him is the L. A. Thompson Scenic Railway Company with a projected investment of 5,500,000 marks. The George A. Lawsha Company's engineer has been looking over the ground and making necessary arrangements. Mr. Joseph Menchen, the New York electrical expert who makes a speciality of spectacular shows, who has given a vivid reproduction of the Johnstown Flood on many stages, (Note: "Mr. John Babbitt of Cohoes. N. Y. has placed an order with Joseph Menchen, designer of electric scenic effects, 1237 Broadway, New York, for the construction of a Mt. Pelee to show the harbor, city and mountain, before, during and after the eruption. The scene will be produced by means of electric effects and apparatus somewhat similar to that used in the production of the Johnstown Flood, which Mr. Menchen installed at Revere Beach, Boston, Mass. Source: "Parks, Pleasure resorts and summer gardens" (PDF). Billboard. 18 July 1903. p. 9d.) is now in Berlin looking for a good place to erect a sign to tempt the public. Mr. John Ringling, the circus owner, looked over the Berlin field for new turns, but found none. Accompanied by Mr. & Mrs. George Scott, of Minneapolis, he left for Vienna.")) (Note: There was another Luna Park in Vienna (run by Joe Menchen's European Amusement Parks Ltd.) in the same gardens as the Rotunde, where Max Reinhardt's spectacular, pageant-like The Miracle (play) would be staged in October 1912, straight after which Menchen filmed The Miracle (1912 film) which would show at Joe Goldsoll's Cines-Palast am Zoo cinema in May 1914. Source: "Berlin succumbs to the Luna Park habit" (PDF). New York Herald. 25 October 1909. p. 9.) Quo Vadis? also featured live actors in the auditorium to reinforce some scenes: "special mobs" were organised by Ryszard Ordynski (Richard Ardinski), Max Reinhardt's manager at the Deutsches Theater, who had stage-managed performances of The Miracle (play) in London in 1911–12, and later in Vienna in 1914. There was an orchestra of about twenty-five men and a full line of sound effects. The orchestra was hidden behind a balustrade between the audience and the screen.

The theatre manager Jacob J. Rosenthal, visiting Berlin, wrote that "Quo Vadis is creating a furore in Berlin though it has been very badly mutilated by the censor, who doesn't seem to offer much objection to the risqué or even the immoral, but who strenuously objects to fights or violence. You can imagine what happened to Quo Vadis. (Note: It is possible that the live costumed action in the auditorium was partly to compensate for the censor's cuts.)

The critic of the Berlin newspaper Germania was more enthusiastic about Ewers' speech than the film which followed:

"With his optimism Evers is not wrong: simply, the cinema's victorious career will reach a very different goal than is given to it today. Not entertainment, but instruction will be the main attraction of cinema in the future. Individual scenes were animated by singing, applause, etc., which can be described as partly successful." (Note: "Mit seinem Optimismus wird Evers nicht unrecht behalten, nur dass die Siegeslaufbahn des Kinos ein ganz anderes Ziel erreicht, als ihm heute gegeben wird. Nicht die Unterhaltung, sondern die Belehrung wird der Hauptzweck des Kinos in der Zukunft sein. Einzelne Bilder wurden durch Gesang, Beifallklatschen usw. belebt, welcher Versuch als teils gelungen bezeichnet werden kann.")

The critic Ferdinand Kiss was especially vitriolic about the whole affair:

At the Nollendorfplatz in Berlin, a new cinema has been let loose upon humanity. The opening film: Quo Vadis, or the persecution of Berliners by Nero in anno 1913. [...] And to outdo all that has gone before – within the film, and in general – one reaches to a desperate medium. What flickers up yonder? Is it Nielsen? Perhaps Lindner? Or even Nauke? No, it's Ewers [ ... ], "the cinema's most fervent advocate, who consecrated the newly opened movie-house by means of a dithyrambic speech." In all other respects, it's downhill too. Fate has ordained filming and Ewers. [ ... ] How will it all end? We want to experience Nauke and see only the flickering Ewers instead."

According to one report, the Nollendorf-Theater and the Cines-Palast am Zoo, where Quo Vadis? also showed, were each taking about 4,500 marks ($1,000) a night with 'Quo Vadis,' giving two performances nightly but no matinees. (Note: 4,500 marks was worth about $1,070 or £220 in 1913, when there were about 4.2 marks to the US dollar and 20.5 marks to the £1. An industrial worker in Germany in 1913 earned about 20 marks ($5) per week, $1,000 in 1913 as a working wage equates to about $104,000 in 2015, but could be anywhere between $18,000 and $456,000 depending on a number of factors. However, the Nollendorf with 650 places was probably taking around 830 marks per show or 1660 marks each night.)

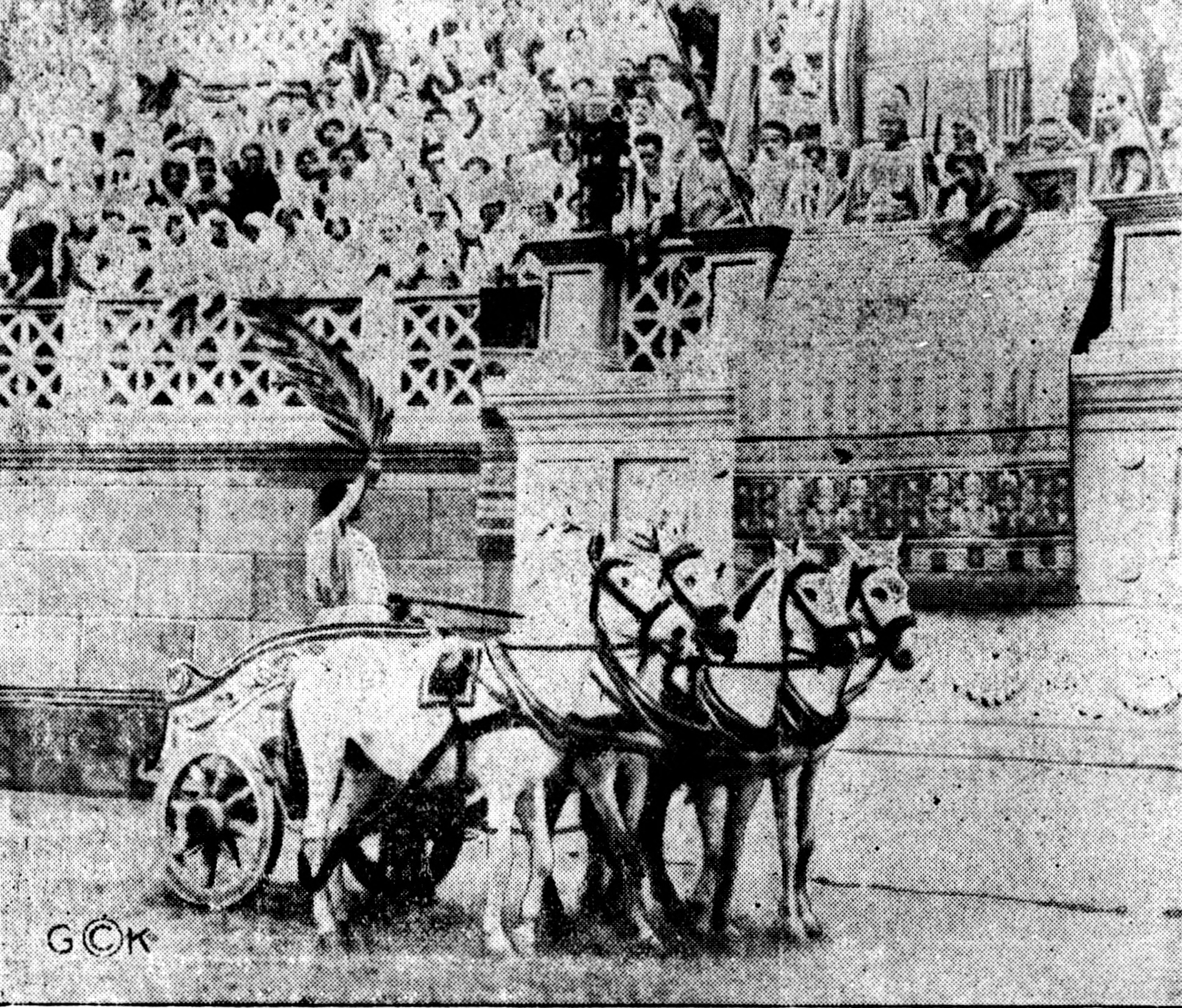
Still from Quo Vadis?

Siegfried Kracauer, writing in 1947, was evidently unaware of the live element incorporated into the film show:

"Despite the evolution of domestic production, foreign films continued to flood German movie theaters, which had considerably increased in number since 1912. A new Leipzig Lichtspiel palace was inaugurated with Quo Vadis, an Italian pageant that actually received press reviews as if it were a real stage play."

Kracauer is referring here to the opening night of the Königspavillon-Theater on Promenadestrasse, Leipzig (lessees, Goldsoll & Woods), on Thursday 24 April 1913 with Quo Vadis?, complete with real actors and a prologue (probably spoken by the "flickering Ewers"). This seems to be exactly the same show as on the opening night of the Nollendorf-Theater in Berlin in March 1913.

The house manager of the Cines-Theater in 1913 and 1914 was the stage actor Valy Arnheim, later a film director and actor.

== Later history ==
By the end of May 1913 the cinema had been renamed the Cines Nollendorf Theater. (Note: "The Cines Nollendorf, the former Nollendorf theater")

After the success of Quo Vadis?, Woods and Goldsoll opened a large chain of theatres in Germany, France, Belgium and the Netherlands, many for Kinovaudeville shows. (Note: Kinovaudeville was essentially a reproduction of shows in New York vaudeville theatres, where the earliest motion pictures were shown in between the variety acts from 1896. The first New York theatres to feature this combination were Koster and Bial's Music Hall, Keith's Union Square Theatre, and Tony Pastor's New Fourteenth Street Theatre. The projectionist at Pastor's was Joseph Menchen, who later became one of the world's largest makers of theatrical lighting equipment, along with Klieg. In 1912 Menchen produced The Miracle, the world's first all-colour narrative feature film. Al. Woods bought the US rights from Menchen, and The Miracle showed in New York for nearly two months in February and March 1913, and at the Ufa-Palast am Zoo in May 1914.) They leased fourteen houses in Germany, including six in Berlin; the second of these after the Nollendorf-Theater was the Groß-Berlin Theater (later the Ufa-Palast am Zoo) which was converted into a kino-vaudeville cinema, where the architect was again Oscar Kaufmann.

=== Banco di Roma ===
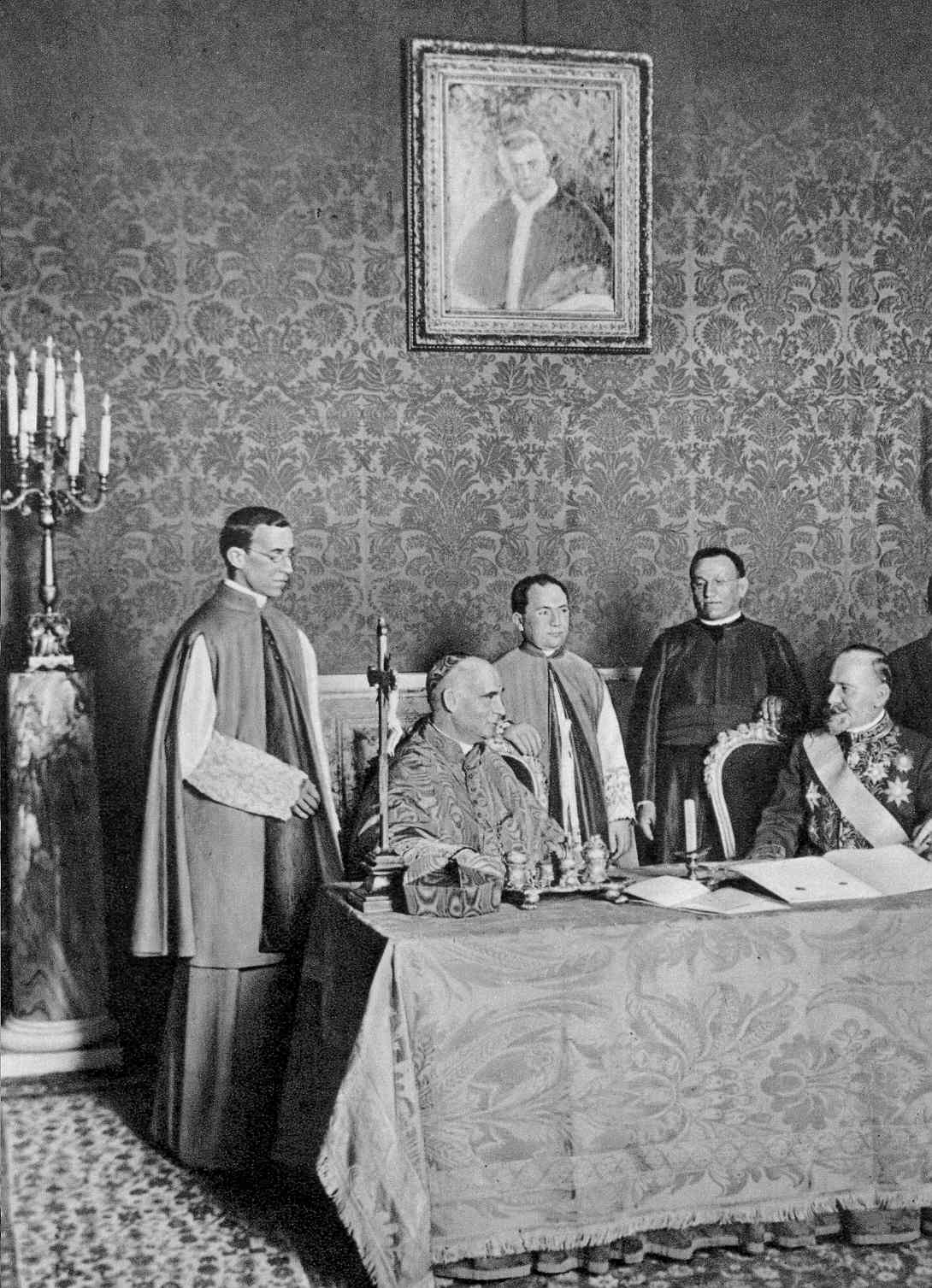
Monsignor Eugenio Pacelli (the future Pope Pius XII and nephew of Ernesto Pacelli, president of the Banco di Roma, (l.) and Cardinal Secretary Merry del Val at the signing ceremony of the Serbian concordat, underneath the picture of Pope Pius X, 24 June 1914

Assertions that the Pope's money was involved in the building of the Nollendorf (Henry 1918, pp. 215–6), appear to be based on more than mere rumour. The Banco di Roma was co-founded in 1880 by Ernesto Pacelli, who soon had the confidence of Pope Leo XIII. According to John F. Pollard , "It would [...] be no exaggeration to say that the Pacellis were the most important family to be associated with the Papacy since the Borgias."

The Società Italiana Cines was founded in Rome in April 1906, and Pacelli became a director before August 1910. The Banco di Roma. apparently speculating with Papal funds, was also running dubious bank-owned enterprises in Tripoli and Salonika (and possibly perhaps Mogadishu, Somalia). Joe Goldsoll seems to have become involved with Cines in around 1912, and if there is any truth in the rumours that the Nollendorf-Theater was "paid for by the Pope's money", they would probably revolve around the fact that a hard-gambling, high-class con man and swindler and the president of a bank which was a quarter owned by the Vatican were both directors of closely linked film and theatre companies. (Note: At the time of the election of Pope Benedict XV in 1914, the Holy See owned 25% of the Banco di Roma and also had large cash deposits at the bank: the previous Pope, Pius X left a cash reserve of around 6 million lire.)

Unfortunately, the bank was in deep trouble by 1914, having suffered severe losses arising out of the Italo-Turkish War (known in Italy as the Libyan War) of 1911–1912

A contemporary memoir of pre-war Germany summed up the extravagance accompanying the whole corrupt situation:

"Then, only a few months before the war, the whole thing crashed. The exorbitant payment of the writers, musicians, painters, actors, managers, the foolish waste of money caused by the production of certain films, which involved the trailing of whole companies of performers to the most distant corners of the world, hurled the enterprise to inevitable disaster. One bankruptcy followed another, while the ordinary comic and patriotic film and the unpretentious playlet quietly reappeared. The sumptuous palaces were ungilded, became skating rinks, halls for Tango teas, or cabarets."

=== Collapse of Cines ===
Goldsoll severed his connection with Cines in February 1914, buying out the interests of A. H. Woods and the Società Italiana Cines in the Berlin-based Cines-Theater AG: Woods pulled out of Germany altogether. Goldsoll re-organized his much-reduced assets as the Palast-Theater AG, taking control of the Cines Palast am Zoo and the Cines Apollo-Theater (Berlin) cinemas, and leasing the Friedrich-Wilhelm-Städtisches Theater for operetta.

The Cines Nollendorf-Theater "reverted" to the Cines Corporation (which may refer to Cines in Rome, it's not entirely clear.) A German Cines limited liability company was formed, Deutsche Cines GmbH, whose offices occupied the old address of Cines-Theater AG at Friedrichstrasse 11. Goldsoll pulled out of Cines altogether and invested in the Turin-based Ambrosio Film, (the Italian distributors of Cines productions), becoming a director by July 1914.

When World War I broke out in August 1914 Italy was nominally allied with the Central Powers, but remained neutral. The war triggered a general international financial instability, and in the public rush to buy War Bonds, 18.3 million lire were withdrawn from the Banco di Roma between January and March 1914. Italy eventually joined the Triple Entente and declared war on Austria-Hungary in May 1915. (Note: Italy didn't declare war against the German Empire until August 1916.) The bank continued to haemorrhage its cash deposits and the value of its shares plummeted, despite an emergency loan arranged by Pacelli from the central Banca d'Italia. Pacelli resigned as president of the Banco di Roma in September 1915, although he was still personally highly indebted to it. To repay his loans he forfeited his shares in the bank, and was forced to sell his villa.

The investments made by Pacelli and the Banco di Roma suddenly unravelled as depositors continued to withdraw millions of lire: by November 1915 Cines had collapsed, along with the bank's other enterprises in Tripoli and Salonika.

Union-Theater/PAGU

It appears that the Nollendorf-Theater and other former Cines-Theater AG properties were transferred around this time to the Union-Theater (U.T. or U-T Lichtspiele) chain of cinemas, owned by Paul Davidson of PAGU: the cinema's name was changed to the Union-Theater Lichtspiele. This corporate name was shared by many other cinemas in Berlin and the rest of Germany, such as the Union-Theater-Lichtspiele in Dresden, and the U.T.-Lichtspiele in Lübeck.

Goldsoll's later career

During World War I Goldsoll, a naturalised French citizen, was imprisoned in D.C. Jail in 1917 while Washington District courts decided whether or not to extradite him to France. He faced charges of defrauding the French war-time government out of millions of dollars in commissions on Pierce-Arrow trucks exported to the French War Department. Goldsoll was released on appeal to the US Supreme Court in 1919.

After the war Goldsoll invested heavily in Goldwyn Pictures, joining the board of directors in July 1919 and, ousting Samuel Goldwyn to become managing director from 1922 to 1924, turned around the fortunes of the ailing company. Woods joined him on the board as a director. Big-budget films such as Wild Oranges were released as Goldwyn films, but Ben-Hur, begun under Goldsoll's management, was finally released as an MGM production after he relinquished control.

=== Ufa ===
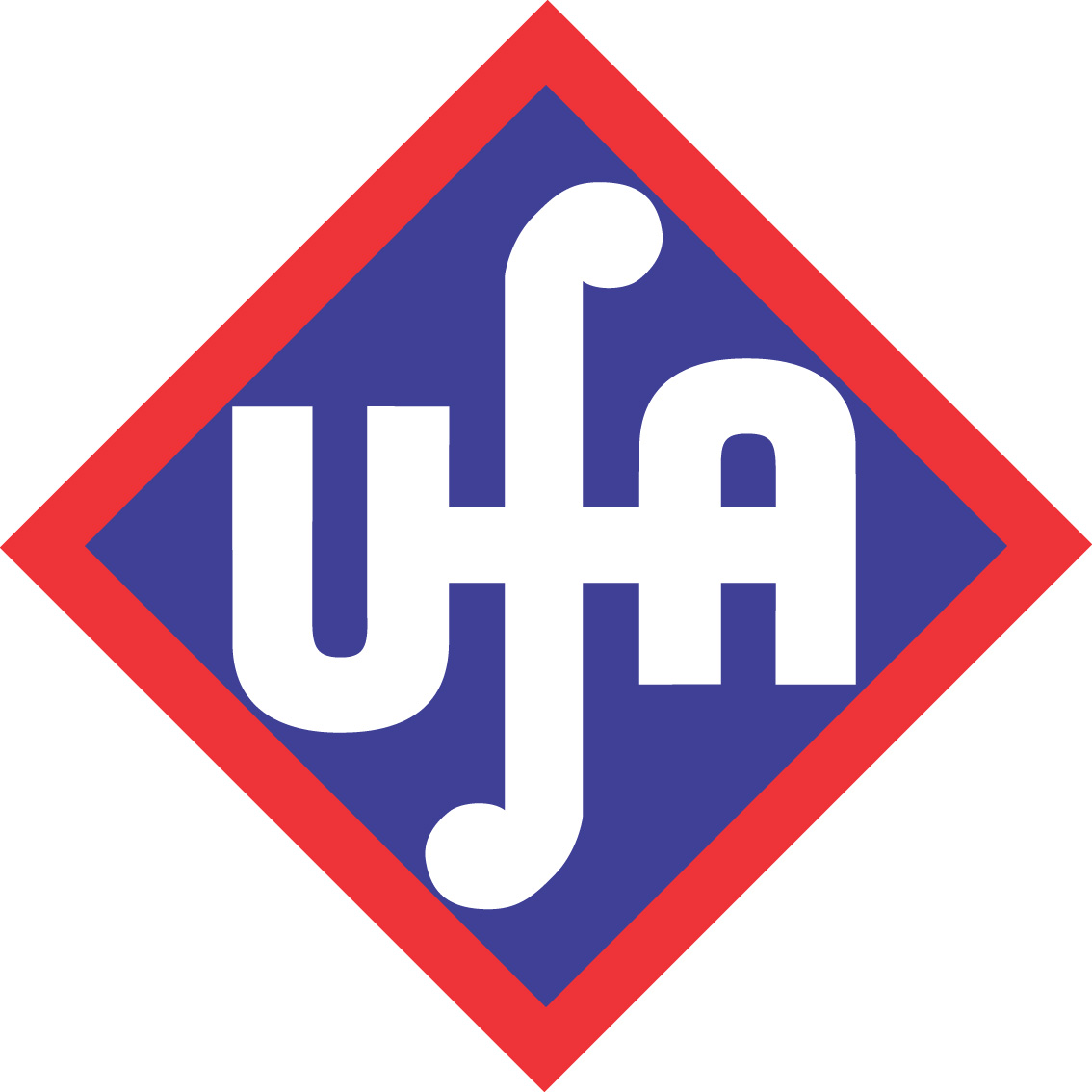
The original Ufa logo

Along with Messter-Film and Nordisk Film, PAGU was one of the three main companies which formed the nucleus of giant conglomerate Universum-Film AG (Ufa), set up in complete secrecy by the German government as part of its propaganda effort in late 1917. The companies which made up Ufa retained their individual identities for some time, and by 1921 the cinema was known as the U.-T. Nollendorfplatz although it was owned by Universum-Film AG.

The composer Giuseppe Becce conducted the orchestra from 1922, having transferred from the Mozart-Saal at the Neues Schauspielhaus over the road at No. 5 Nollendorfplatz, where he had been since 1915. (Note: Later conducting engagements included the Tauentzien Palast from 1923 and the Gloria-Palast in 1926.)

The cinema was renamed the Ufa-Theater Nollendorfplatz in 1924, but Ufa was bankrupt by 1925, having spent enormous sums on films like Die Nibelungen and Der letzte Mann. It seems likely that Ufa sold back control of the old Union Theater Lichtspiele cinema chain to its former owner, Paul Davidson, former head of production at Ufa.

Then in December 1925 Ufa announced the so-called Parufamet contract, which gave virtual control of Ufa's first-run theatres (including the Ufa-Theater am Nollendorfplatz) to Paramount and Metro-Goldwyn-Mayer while also granting them 50 percent of income from Ufa's own productions. Two years later Ufa was bought by the right-wing media tycoon Alfred Hugenberg (whose own company Deulig (formerly DLG) had been absorbed into Ufa in 1920), and the cinema received its final name, Ufa-Pavillon in 1927.

=== Metropolis ===
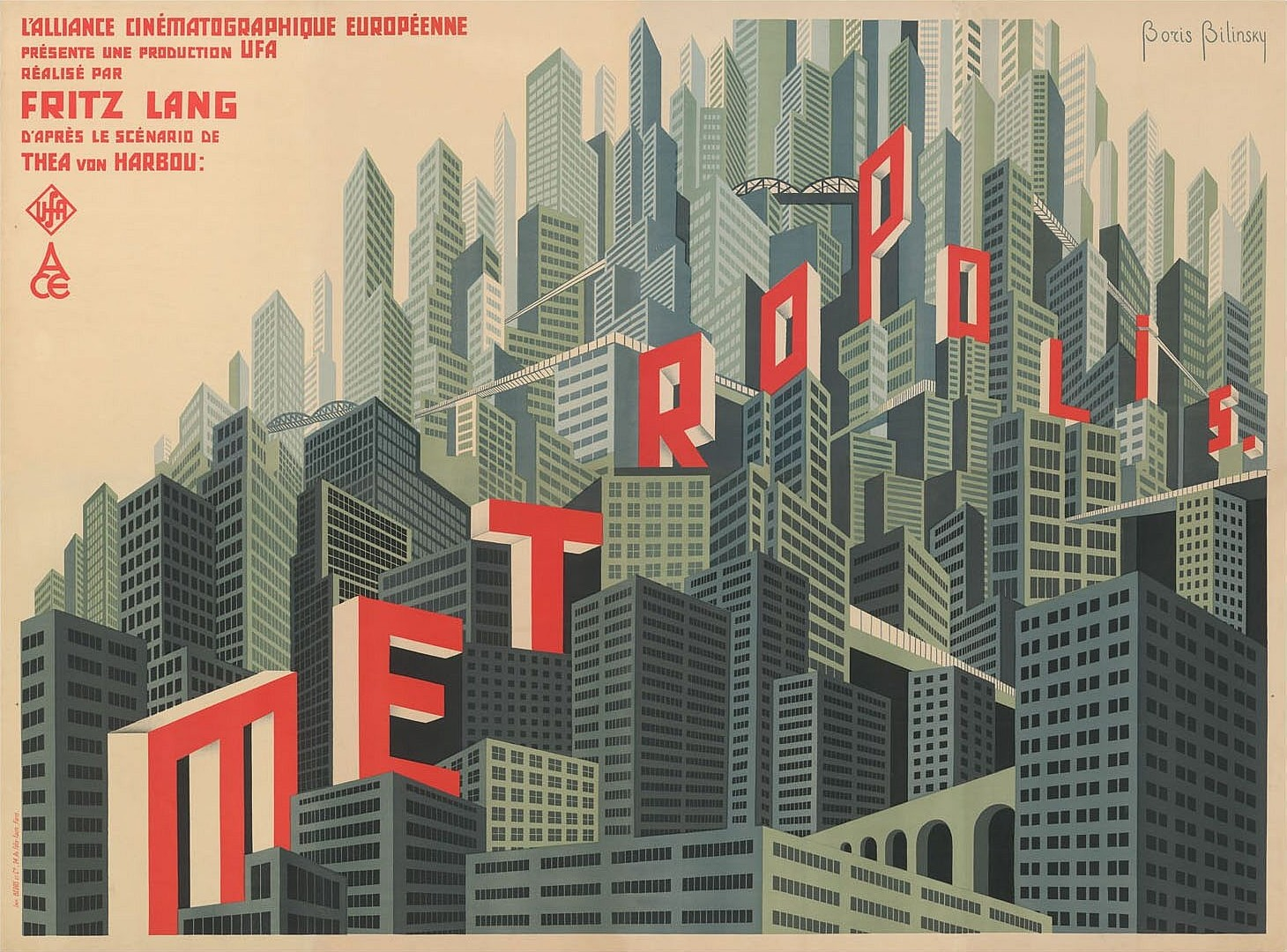
Poster for the French version of Metropolis

Announcements that Fritz Lang's Metropolis would be shown at the Ufa-Pavillon am Nollendorfplatz had appeared as early as 6 January 1927. (Note: Illustrierte Film-Zeigung, Nr. 1, 6 January 1927.) The cinema's exterior was coated all over with a shimmery silver paint, and illuminated by floodlights; the statue over the entrance was covered by a huge replica gong which featured towards the end of the film. Metropolis received its gala première on 10 January 1927 at the Ufa-Palast am Zoo, where the director, film crew and cast were in the audience along with the German President Wilhelm Marx. It transferred the next day to the Ufa-Pavillon Nollendorfplatz." (Note: "Metropolls wurde mit Riesenerfolg in dem Ufa-Palast am Zoo und vom 11. ab im Ufa-Pavillon Nollendorfplatz aufgeführt. Presse und Publikum sind einstimmig begeistert über das grandiose Filmwerk.") A review which appeared the following day: "The film "Metropolis", after its premiere yesterday at the Ufa-Palast am Zoo, will be screened from to-day on at the Ufa Pavilion at the Nollendorfplatz. (Note: Hildenbrandt, Fred (11 January 1927). Berliner Tageblatt (late edition), pp.2–3, via Michael Organ's Metropolis site.) The film continued to show for about four months at the Ufa-Pavillon, the only cinema in the whole of Germany where it could be seen. It was accompanied by Gottfried Huppertz's specially-written score, which was conducted by Richard Etlinger at the premiere. (Note: Etlinger arranged a number of popular works for orchestra. See Ries & Erle sales catalogue, September 2014. Retrieved 4 January 2017.)

Ufa's own publicity magazine claimed that "Press and public are unanimously thrilled by the grandiose work of cinematography." Although many critics commented favourably on the film's technical achievements, a significant number were singularly unimpressed by the underlying philosophy of the script:

"Modern film and the reactionary romantic piffle of Thea von Harbou can have nothing in common."

— Herbert Ihering, "Der Metropolis, Ufa-Palast am Zoo". Berliner Börsen-Courier, 11 January 1927.

Herbert Ihering summed up the single performance at the Ufa-Palast am Zoo: "A great premiere – much applause by the audience for the director Fritz Lang, for the cameraman Karl Freund, for the actors Alfred Abel, Heinrich George and Brigitte Helm. As for the film? No effort spared with brilliant technical detail, but it was wasted on a banal, no longer pertinent idea. The city of the future with the text of a bourgeois past." (Note: Ihering, Herbert (11 January 1927). "Der Metropolis (Vorbericht)". Berliner Börsen-Courier. Metropolis (preliminary report) (in German) (Early ed.). Berlin: 5., cited in)

=== Destruction ===
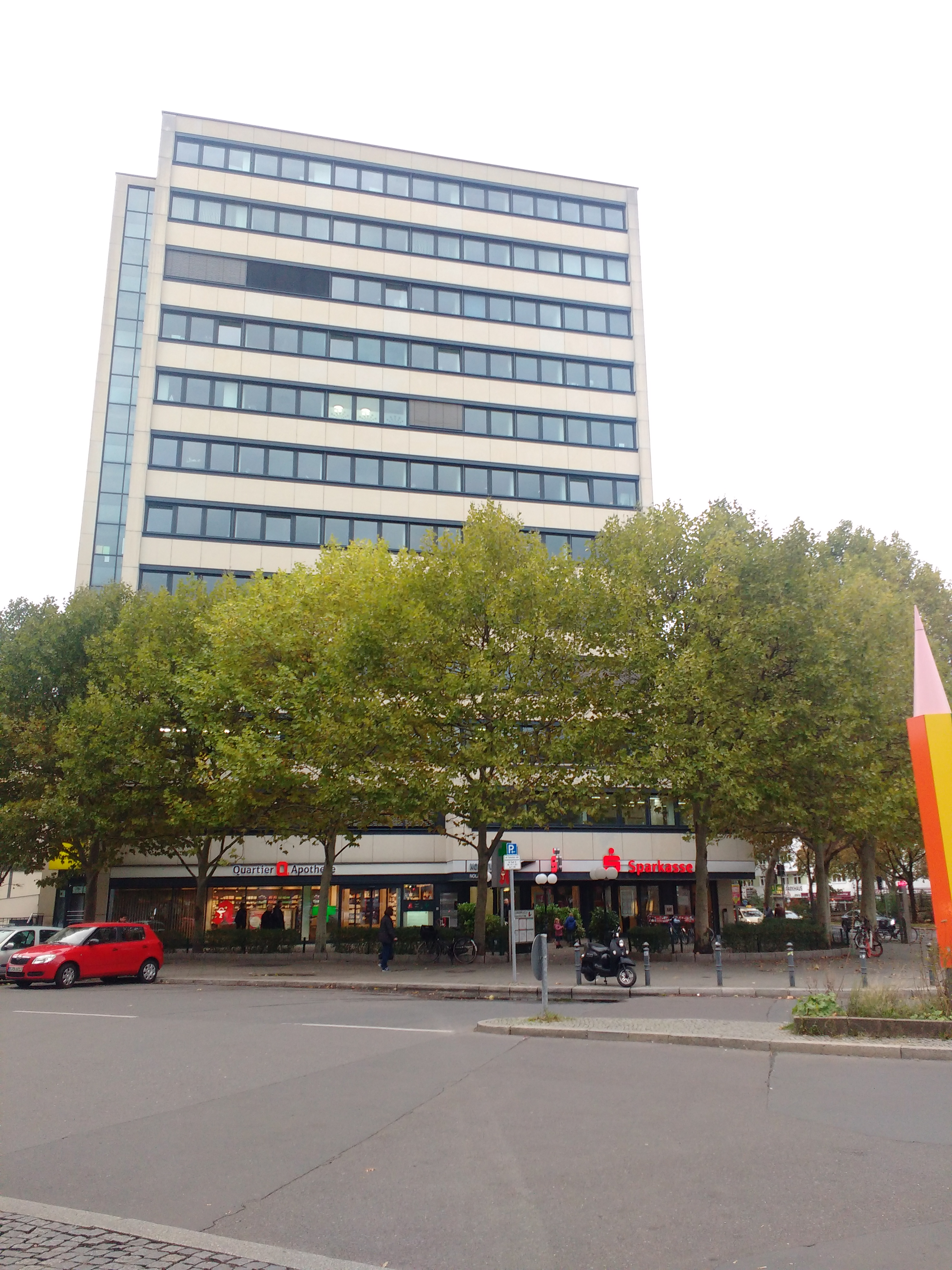
The site of 4 Nollendorfplatz in October 2019

The cinema was closed after it was damaged during an RAF bombing raid in 1943. There were 17 large raids on Berlin from November 1943 to the end of January 1944. It seems quite possible that the Ufa-Pavillon was bombed on 22/23 or 23/24 November 1943, right at the start of the Battle of Berlin: "A vast area of destruction stretched from the central districts westwards across the mainly residential districts of Tiergarten and Charlottenburg". Buildings destroyed or severely damaged include: Kaiser Wilhelm Memorial Church and the Gloria-Palast, the Ufa-Palast am Zoo across the square, the Berlin Zoo and much of the Unter den Linden. (Note: Other significant air raids on Berlin include: 18/19 November 1943: Berlin was completely cloud-covered and bombing was random.; 23/24 November: The Deutsche Oper was bombed. Casualty details of this raid were conflated with those of the previous night (22/23 November). Royal Air Force Bomber Command 60th Anniversary.; 26/27 November: Reinickendorf, the Siemensstadt, and the Berlin Zoo were bombed.; 16/17 December The National Theatre (Preußisches Staatstheater) (now Konzerthaus Berlin) was badly damaged.; 1/2 and 2/3 January 1944: Two relatively ineffective raids because of low cloud cover.; 27/28 January: 28/29 January: Four theatres, the new Reich Chancellery and the French Cathedral in the Gendarmenmarkt were damaged.; 15/16 February: The last big raid in the Battle for Berlin.)

The American Church in Berlin (literally next door) was destroyed probably in early 1944.

A block of 1960s era apartments now stands on the site.

See also § External links

== Name changes ==
- March 1913: Nollendorf-Theater
- May 1913: Cines Nollendorf Theater (Note: Article referring to "the Cines Nollendorf, the former Nollendorf theater".)
- February 1914: Cines Nollendorf Theater (Note: The Berlin Addressbuch for 1914 simply gives the owner as Cines-Theater AG, Friedrichstr. 11 (the German company), with no cinema name. A review (in German) in Berliner Architekturwelt in 1914 has a drawing of the cinema with the name in gold letters on the roof. (Nachtlicht 1914, pp. 60–61, figs. 81–82). The cinema "reverted to the Cines Corporation" when Goldsoll terminated his connection with Societa Italiana Cines in February 1914. It continued under the ownership of Deutsche Cines GmbH until late 1915.)
- November 1915: Union Theater Lichtspiele (or U.-T. Lichtspiele). (Note: Cines collapsed by November 1915 when the Banco di Roma got into difficulties after Italy joined World War I. Cines' interests in Germany seem to have been bought by Union Theater, part of Paul Davidson's PAGU. PAGU was in turn bought out in 1917 by the Ufa conglomerate (secretly created by the German government as part of its propaganda effort), but the cinema continued to use the Union Theater Lichtspiele name.)
- 1921–23: Union-Theater Nollendorfplatz
- 1 June 1924: Ufa-Theater am Nollendorfplatz (Note: From Ufa's founding in 1917 the production companies, as departments within the conglomerate, maintained their individual identities and released films under their own names. Under Eric Pommer's control, more and more major productions (Großfilmen) appeared as Ufa films. On 1 June 1924, Ufa centralised its entire production and rental system, taking over complete financial control, along with a re-branding of all the cinemas under its umbrella; thus all the Union-Theater cinemas became UFA houses. Ufa's International Publicity Booklet for 1924/1925 details the resulting film companies and their rental operations (Verleih-Betriebe): online title given as Das Verleih-Programme 1924/25 der Universum-Film-Verleih.: Universum-Film-Verleih (n.d.) [1924]. Universum-Film A.-G (PDF). Berlin: Ufa.)
- 1925: Union Theater Lichtspiele.
- 1926: Ufa-Theater am Nollendorfplatz
- January 1927 – 1943: Ufa-Pavillon am Nollendorfplatz

== Films shown ==
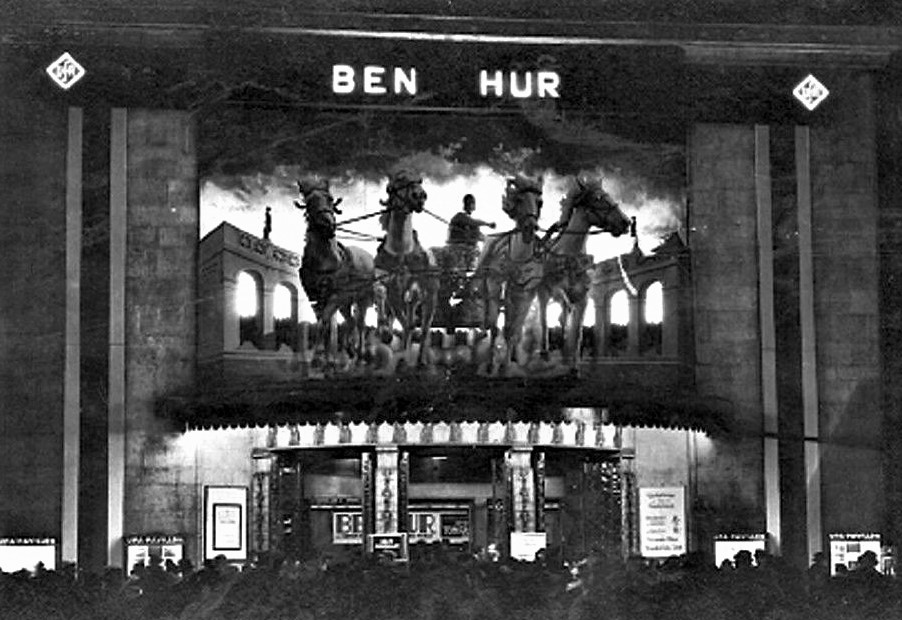
The façade advertising Ben-Hur, 1926

With only 650 seats, the cinema was not generally used as a premier release venue like the much bigger Ufa-Palast am Zoo or the Tauenzien-Palast. Although many films shown there were first runs of some sort, only few of them are particularly well known. The most notable films to show there are the opening presentation of Quo Vadis? (1913) by Enrico Guazzoni; Ben-Hur (1925) directed by Fred Niblo; a pre-release showing of F. W. Murnau's Faust (1926); and Fritz Lang's Metropolis (1927); also two of Emil Jannings's early films, Die Augen der Mumie Ma and The Daughter of Mehemed directed by Ernst Lubitsch, and several more by the same director.

=== Silent films ===
- 19 March 1913: Quo Vadis? by Enrico Guazzoni (German première)
- 11 April 1913: Die Heldin von St. Honorée (aka Kein schön’rer Tod), directed by Emil Albes for Deutsche Bioscope. Double bill with Das gelobte Land, German title of Italian film produced by Cines Rome.
- 27 June 1913: Max als Torero, with Max Linder.
- 25 July 1913: Le Duel de Max – Max Linder's first feature film (abendfüllender Spielfilm). International double première with the Paris Olympia
- 13 July 1913: Max ist ein Katzenfeind , with Max Linder (German première)
- 14 August 1913: Press showing of Antony and Cleopatra (Die Herrin des Nils–Cleopatra), directed by Guazzoni, with Gianna Terribili-Gonzales, Amleto Novelli and Ignazio Lupi.
- 15 August 1913: Auf in den Kampf, Torero!, Schlittenschatten, Gebräuche in den Abruzzen, Bliemchens Frauen, Bunny trainiert, Mr. Pyp und sein Flirt. A typical holiday programme with five shorter films.
- 29 August 1913: Der Feind im Land directed by Curt A. Stark, produced by Oskar Messter, with Henny Porten.
- 4 September 1913: Das fremde Mädchen, German première of the Swedish film Den okända by Mauritz Stiller, based on a 1911 play by von Hugo von Hofmannsthal
- October 1913: Mit der Kamera im ewigen Eis – documentary about the German Arctic Expedition, led by Herbert Schröder-Stranz (see also Deutsche Arktische Expedition)
- 1914: Denkende Pferde
- 13 March 1914: Der goldene Skarabäus (The Golden Scarab)
- 20 March 1914: Der Schuß um Mitternacht, directed by Walter Schmidthässler, produced by Vitascope, with Felix Basch and Hanni Weisse. (Note: Schmidthässler, having acted and directed for Vitascope since 1910, founded his own Schmidthassler-Film GmbH in 1911. In February 1912 he founded Continental-Kunstfilm, merging it with Schmidthassler-Film, but returned to Vitascope in April 1912 and went on to direct around 100 films there.)
- May 1914: Vendetta di Pagliaccio (Die Geschichte eines Pierrot), with Emilio Ghione, distributed by Cines. German première.
- May 1914: Spartacus, directed by Giovanni Enrico Vidali, music by Modest Altschuler.
- 5 June 1914: Eine tolle Nacht (1914), with Henry Bender
- 30 October 1914: Otto heiratet, directed by Heinrich Bolten-Baeckers with Otto Reutter (BB-Film)
- 30 October 1914: Sanitätshunde im Kriegsdienste. Documentary.
- October? 1914: Der Schuss, Skottet (1914). German première? of Swedish film directed by Mauritz Stiller, produced by sv:Svenska Biografteatern, with Egil Eide, Jenny Tschernichin-Larsson.
- 27 November 1914: Sie kann nicht nein sagen, directed by Nunek Danuky (Danny Kaden), with Margret Fischbach, script by Richard Oswald.
- December 1914: Jungdeutschland, a film about war in the air, directed by Heinrich Bolten-Baeckers with Leo Peukert
- 28 May 1915: Blindekuh (film) (Blind's Man Bluff), directed by and starring Ernst Lubitsch, with Ressel Orla. Produced by PAGU
- July 1915: Das Gesetz der Mine, the first of the Joe Deebs detective series which Joe May directed after splitting with Ernst Reicher and leaving Continental-Kunstfilm in 1914, starring Max Landa and Ellen Richter.
- 15 October 1915: Sein schwierigster Fall, the second Joe Deebs film, with Max Landa and Joe May's wife Mia May.
- 26 November 1915: Der Geheimsekretär, by Joe May with Max Landa (Joe Deebs #3)
- 9 June 1916: Shoe Palace Pinkus, comedy directed by Ernst Lubitsch, with Guido Herzfeld, Ernst Lubitsch and Ossi Oswalda. Also premièred at U.T. Kurfürstendamm (Filmbühne Wien).
- March 1917: Das Nachtgespräch, with Erich Kaiser-Titz, produced by Greenbaum-Film
- 16 November 1917: When Four Do the Same, directed by Ernst Lubitsch, with Emil Jannings, Ossi Oswalda, and Margarete Kupfer. Also premiered at the U. T. Kurfürstendamm (Filmbühne Wien).
- 28 September 1918: Diary of a Lost Woman, directed by Richard Oswald with Erna Morena, Conrad Veidt and Werner Krauß. Double première with the UT Kurfürstendamm (Filmbühne Wien).
- 3 October 1918: Die Augen der Mumie Ma, directed by Ernst Lubitsch, with Pola Negri, Emil Jannings, and Harry Liedtke
- 13 December 1918: Jettchen Geberts Geschichte, Part II (Henriette Jacoby) directed by Richard Oswald with Conrad Veidt. (Note: Part I of Jettchen Geberts Geschichte showed at the UT Kufürstendamm on 8 November 1918.)
- 19 December 1918: The Pied Piper of Hamelin, starring and directed by Paul Wegener for PAGU, with Lyda Salmonova and Elsa Wagner.
- 17 January 1919: Meyer aus Berlin, directed by Ernst Lubitsch, starring Lubitsch and Ossi Oswalda.
- July 1919: Die Sünderin, directed by Leo Lasko with Ernst Hofmann
- 15 August 1919: The Daughter of Mehemed, directed by Alfred Halm, with Ellen Richter, Harry Liedtke and Emil Jannings
- September 1919: Bis früh um fünfe, directed by Heinrich Bolten-Baeckers
- 26 September 1919: Das Werk seines Lebens directed by Adolf Gärtner with Gertrude Welcker, Else Bassermann, Albert Bassermann and Auguste Prasch-Grevenberg Camera: Mutz Greenbaum. Produced by Jules Greenbaum (Greenbaum-Film) for Ufa
- November 1919: De profundis, directed by Georg Jacoby, with Ellen Richter, Magnus Stifter and Emil Rameau
- 21 April 1920: Ganz ohne Männer geht die Chose nicht, directed by Lorenz Bätz
- June 1920: S. M. der Reisende (His Majesty the Tourist)
- 2 July 1920: Brigantenliebe, directed by Martin Hartwig, with Ellen Richter, Hans Adalbert Schlettow and Emil Rameau
- August 1920: Der verbotene Weg (1919), directed by Henrik Galeen with John Gottowt
- October 1920: Tyrannei des Todes, directed by and starring Friedrich Feher
- 15 October 1920: Die Dame in Schwarz, another Joe Deebs detective film
- 23 September 1921: The Adventure of Doctor Kircheisen, directed by Rudolf Biebrach, script by Robert Wiene.
- 30 September 1921 The Story of Christine von Herre, directed by Ludwig Berger with Agnes Straub, Werner Krauss and Paul Hartmann.
- 2 April 1922: Die Grundlagen der Einsteinschen Relativitäts-Theorie, directed by Hanns Walter Kornblum. Documentary with animation and accompanying lecture. Some footage was included in The Einstein Theory of Relativity (1923) by Max and Dave Fleischer.
- 18 August 1922: Zweite Heimat, directed by John W. Brunius, with Nils Lundell Paul Seelig, Tore Svennberg and Pauline Brunius.
- 28 March 1924: The House by the Sea (Das Haus am Meer), directed by Fritz Kaufmann and starring Asta Nielsen.
- 4 April 1924: Steuerlos, directed by Gennaro Righelli for Trianon-Film with Maria Jacobini, Rosa Valetti, Charles Willy Kayser and Heinrich George. (Note: Original Censor notices; "Steurlos; Zensurentscheidung, Filmprüfstelle Berlin, 30.01.1924". filmportal.de (in German). and "Steurlos; Zensurentscheidung, Oberfilm-Oberprüfstelle 04.02.1924". filmportal.de (in German).)
- 10 November 1924: Three Wise Fools, directed by King Vidor for Goldwyn Pictures, whose president at the time was Joe Goldsoll, with A. H. Woods on the board of directors, who had built the cinema in the first place. (German première)
- 5 May 1925 Um Recht und Ehre (For Justice and Honour), directed by Richard Löwenbein for Trianon-Film with Harry Liedtke, Agnes Esterhazy and Mary Parker.
- 20 August 1926: I Once Had a Comrade (Ich hatt’ einen Kameraden), directed by Conrad Wiene, with Erich Kaiser-Titz, Hans Albers, Grete Reinwald, Emil Heyse.
- 26 August 1926: Faust, directed by F. W. Murnau. Apparently a single pre-release showing. Faust premièred with new subtitles at the Ufa-Palast am Zoo on 14 October 1926. (Note: "Der Faust-film, 1925/26 im Ufa-Atelier in der Tempelhofer Oberlandstraße entstanden, und am 26. August 1926 einmalig im U.T. Nollendorfplatz, dann am 14. Oktober mit neuen Untertiteln im Ufa-Palast am Zoo uraufgeführt".)
- 7 September 1926: Ben-Hur: A Tale of the Christ, directed by Fred Niblo (European première). Begun as a Goldwyn Films production while Godsoll was in control, but finished and released as one of the first MGM films after the merger.
- 20 March 1928: the 1928 Winter Olympics documentary The White Stadium (Das weiße Stadion), directed by Arnold Fanck.
- 10 September 1928: The Student Prince in Old Heidelberg, directed by Ernst Lubitsch for MGM, with Ramón Novarro, Norma Shearer and Philippe De Lacy (Berlin première)
- 12 November 1928: Villa Falconieri, a German-Italian film directed by Richard Oswald
- 23 November 1928: The Abduction of the Sabine Women, comedy directed by Robert Land for DLS (Deutsches Lichtspiel-Syndikat AG}.
- 30 November 1928: Jesse James (Ein Bandit von Ehre), Paramount film with Fred Thomson, distributed by Parufamet
- 7 December 1928: Man, Woman and Sin (Mann, Weib, Sünde), MGM film directed by Monta Bell with John Gilbert and Jeanne Eagels, distributed by Parufamet
- 14 December 1928 Hindle Wakes (Jahrmarkt der Liebe), British romance directed by Maurice Elvey with Estelle Brody and John Stuart
- 10 January 1929: Om Mane Padmi Hum, documentary about Tibet. Music by Fritz Wenneis, who also composed the music for Fliehende Schatten, shown on 12 April 1932.
- 12 March 1929: Pori – Ein Film aus dem afrikanischen Busch, drama/documentary film directed by Freiherr (Baron) Adolph von Dungern.
- 6 June 1929: Pamir – das Dach der Welt (German première), documentary about the 1928 German-Soviet Alay-Pamir Expedition to climb Lenin Peak, directed by Vladimir Schneiderov, with mountaineers Karl Wien, Eugen Allwein and the Austrian Erwin Schneider.
- 19 July 1929: Emden III fährt um die Welt, documentary about the German cruiser Emden. Berlin premiere.
- 26 August 1929: With Cobham to the Cape, directed by Alan Cobham, of Flying Circus fame (Berlin première)
- 3 September 1929: Ich lebe für Dich, directed by Wilhelm Dieterle, produced by Joe Pasternak, music by Willy Schmidt-Gentner.
- 17 September 1929: The Ship of Lost Souls, directed by Maurice Tourneur, with Marlene Dietrich, Fritz Kortner, and Robin Irvine

=== Sound film era ===
- 8 October 1929: The River, a part-talkie directed by Frank Borzage, produced by William Fox. (Note: The film used the Vitaphone sound-on-disc sound system. Although sound films had been produced since the beginning of the movie era, the first full-length German sound film (almost two hours long, using the Tobis Film system) was Das Land ohne Frauen directed by Carmine Gallone with Elga Brink and Conrad Veidt, had premièred at the Berlin Capitol am Zoo cinema on September 30, 1929 with pre-recorded music but no dialogue.)
- 14 October 1929: "Charlies Karriere": The Rink; Behind the Screen; The Fireman; and The Cure, four silent two-reelers all starring and directed by Charlie Chaplin for Mutual Film in 1916–17. (Note: These may have had a soundtrack added to the original silent films.)
- 7 November 1929: Napoleon at Saint Helena, silent film directed by Lupu Pick, with Werner Krauß and Albert Bassermann. (Note: The film critic Else Lasker-Schüler lived almost next door to the Neues Schauspielhaus, and was injured there when Nazis released stink bombs and mice into the auditorium and assaulted audience members during a showing of All Quiet on the Western Front. Source: Conway, James J. (22 August 2013). "Places: Nollendorfplatz". Strange Flowers at Wordpress.com. Retrieved 11 October 2016.)
- 12 December 1929: The League of Three, silent film directed by Hans Behrendt with Jenny Jugo, (Note: Jugo also appeared in the 1925 film The Doll of Luna Park. Luna Park, Berlin at Halensee was constructed in 1909 by European Amusement Parks Ltd., co-director Joseph Menchen, who used the profits to make The Miracle (1912 film), and sold the rights to Albert H. Woods who co-built the Ufa-Pavillon and the Cines-Palast am Zoo the following year.) camera by Werner Brandes, music by Willy Schmidt-Gentner.
- 20 December 1929: White Shadows in the South Seas (1928), directed by W. S. Van Dyke for Cosmopolitan Productions, distributed by MGM. First MGM film with pre-recorded music and sound effects (but no dialogue), and the first to feature the roar of Leo the Lion at the beginning. (Note: The film used the Vitaphone sound-on-disc recording system developed by Western Electric, with 16 inches (41 cm) diameter discs, recorded at 33 1/3 rpm. On 16 December, Ufa's first major sound film Melody of the Heart had just opened at the Ufa-Palast am Zoo, using the Tri-Ergon sound-on-film system. (Gandert 1993, p. 870))
- 14 March 1930: The Last Company (Die letzte Kompagnie), directed by Kurt Bernhardt for Ufa, with Conrad Veidt and Karin Evans.
- 1 July 1930(?) : Abenteuer unter Kannibalen (Chez les mangeurs d'hommes, "Living with the Cannibals"). Documentary sound film from 1928, directed by André-Paul Antoine. Used a sound-on-disc system.
- 23 December 1930: Africa Speaks! (Afrika spricht!), an early all-sound 'talkie' US documentary by Walter Futter about an American wildlife expedition to Africa. Camera: Paul L. Hoefler, narration by Lowell Thomas. Available complete on Youtube. Also shown at the 'Universum'. (Note: Heinz Pol, Vossische Zeitung (Berlin). Nr. 605 (Morgen-Ausgabe), 24 December 1930.) (Note: The film used the Western Electric sound recording system. It ran for three months at the Ufa-Pavillon, and was successful all over Europe in different language versions.)
- 10 March 1931: Urwald-symphonie (Die grüne Hölle), sound documentary filmed in the Amazon jungle, directed by Pola Bauer-Adamara and her husband August Brückner. (Note: The sound reproduction system in the Ufa-Pavillon for this film used the Lignose-Breusing System, a synchronized sound-on-disc system compatible with Vitaphone and British Photophone. It was co-founded in 1928 by the film producer Heinrich Bolten-Baeckers and Lignose AG (a chemical firm which processed nitrates, producing raw celluloid film, along with guncotton and other explosives, with a sideline in pocket pistols.) Bolten-Baeckers had the general agency for the celluloid film subsidiary Lignose-Rohfilm since about 1919. The company's offices were at 32–34 Lindenstraße, Berlin. The Lignose-Breusing system was briefly a competitor to the Tri-Ergon sound-on-film system, which soon became the predominant sound system in continental Europe until 1945.) (Note: The filming of a new documentary feature film, The Lost Voice by Christina Rose, the great-grand niece of Pola Bauer-Adamara, was announced at the 2025 Cannes Film Festival. Rose is seeking to discover who her great-grand aunt Pola was and why her film career abruptly ended in obscurity after her last expedition into the Amazon forest.)
- 2 April 1931: The Street Song (Gassenhauer), directed by Lupu Pick, his last film, with the Comedian Harmonists.
- 27 April 1931 City Lights, starring and directed by Charlie Chaplin. Sound film without dialogue but with pre-recorded musical score written by Chaplin, and sound effects. The German premiere had taken place on 26 March 1931 at the Ufa-Palast am Zoo. (Note: Photo of the Ufa-Pavillon showing City Lights, and the Mozartsaal on the other side of the road showing Kinder vor Gericht, which opened on 23 May 1931: thus City Lights had been showing for nearly a month.) (Note: No Chaplin films were shown in Germany until 1920, although he had been active since 1914. Between 1921 and 1923, Ufa had secured the rights for thirty-five of Chaplin’s short films; twenty-one one act films and fourteen two act films, which were combined for different 12 programs. The Kid, his first feature to be released in Germany, only premiered on 16 November 1923. Chaplin had made a brief world tour to promote City Lights starting in London and Paris. He stayed in Berlin for a week from 9 March and was met with a rapturous reception, although the visit was somewhat disappointing for him. Chaplin made some forthright statements to Die Rote Fahne, the paper of the German Communist Party about how "capitalism is the enemy, the real enemy of the working class.", and "I can only say one thing, that the unemployed have my deepest sympathy.")
- 13 August 1931: Douamont: Die Hölle von Verdun, dramatised WWI documentary directed by Heinz Paul, camera Georg Bruckbauer. Also shown at the Ufa-Theater Universum.
- 27 August 1931: Tabu: A Story of the South Seas, directed by F. W. Murnau. German premiere. (Note: There was a pre-release Press showing on 5 August 1931 at the Gloria-Palast.) Dialogue-free sound film with recorded orchestral score by Hugo Riesenfeld, and sound effects. Floyd Crosby won the 1931 Academy Award for Best Cinematography.
- 29 March 1932: Two in a Car (Zwei in einem Auto), directed by Joe May for DLS (Deutsches Lichtspiel-Syndikat AG}, with Karl Ludwig Diehl, Magda Schneider, and Richard Romanowsky. Premiered at the Gloria-Palast on 8 March 1932, re-released in 20 Berlin first-run cinemas on 5 April 1923.
- 5 April 1932: The Five Accursed Gentlemen (Die fünf verfluchten Gentlemen), directed by Julien Duvivier, with Anton Walbrook, Camilla Horn and Jack Trevor. Music by Jacques Ibert. German-language version of Duvivier's Les cinq gentlemen maudits. First shown at Universum cinema, Berlin, on 23 March 1932.
- 12 April 1932: Fliehende Schatten, African wildlife drama documentary directed by Carl Junghans and Gösta Nordhaus, with Claus von Suchotzky. (Note: Suchotzky was also the pilot for the flying sequences in Storm over Mont Blanc.) Edited by Arnold Fanck. Music by Fritz Wenneis, who also wrote the music for Om Mane Padmi Hum, shown on 10 January 1929. The pilot of the camera aircraft was Ernst Udet. (Note: Udet flew one of two planes, and wrote a book with many photos entitled Fremde Vögel über Afrika, 1st ed. 1931/1932, 2nd ed. 1943.) (Only 83 minutes still exist, which amounts to about half of the original film.)
- April 1932? : Advance notice for Faust, silent 1926 film directed by F. W. Murnau, music (for German cinemas) by Werner R. Heymann. Re-released with recorded orchestral accompaniment played by the Ufa-Orchestra. (Note: Faust first played at the Ufa-Pavillon in a pre-release showing with intertitles by Gerhart Hauptmann, after the original intertitles by Hans Kyser were scrapped by the Ufa management. However, Hauptmann's attempt was considered even worse, and it eventually premiered at the Ufa-Palast am Zoo with Keyser's original intertitles.)
- 16 February 1933: Insel der Dämonen (The Island of Demons) by Friedrich Dalsheim
- 3 March 1933: Am Horst der wilden Adler, documentary, 96 min., directed by Walter Hege
- 6 October 1933: Der Weltkrieg (The World War), documentary directed/edited by de:Svend Noldan: abridged compilation of Der Weltkrieg 1. Teil, Des Volkes Heldengang and 2. Teil, Des Volkes Not (1927–1928), directed by Leo Lasko, camera Fritz Arno Wagner. Complete film (123 mins) at Filmportal.de
- 14 December 1934: Der Firmling, (short film, 23 mins.) directed by and starring Karl Valentin, with Liesl Karlstadt. Produced by Arya-Film.
- 14 December 1934: Schach der Eva, directed by Ludwig Schmid-Wildy, produced by Arya-Film.
- 23 December 1935: The White Hell of Piz Palü, directed by Arnold Fanck and Georg Wilhelm Pabst, with Leni Riefenstahl and Ernst Udet. Music by Willy Schmidt-Gentner. World première of the German sound version. 91 mins., (original silent version 1929).
- 14 April 1937: Victims of the Past (Opfer der Vergangenheit), a NSDAP propaganda film, shown in every cinema in Germany.
- 3 October 1937: The Tale of the Fox, a Russian 1930 animated feature film with added soundtrack, directed by Ladislas Starevich.

== Namesake ==
References to the 'Berliner Theater am Nollendorfplatz' in the 1930s mentioning Erwin Piscator, Berthold Brecht, Gustav von Wangenheim, Hans Meyer-Hanno and others, probably refer to the Neues Schauspielhaus at 5 Nollendorfplatz. The building also included a cinema, the Mozartsaal, converted from a concert hall.

== See also ==
Literary, artistic, architectural and cultural events in 1913

- Architecture
  - City Federal Building, Birmingham, Alabama
  - Grand Central Terminal, New York City, opened after rebuilding
  - The Woolworth Building in Manhattan opened
- Mathematics
  - Alfred North Whitehead and Bertrand Russell – Principia Mathematica completed
- Art
  - The Armory Show ran in New York City from February 17 – March 15
  - Kazimir Malevich – a Black Square appeared in scenery designs by for the Futurist opera Victory over the Sun
- Literature
  - Alain-Fournier – Le Grand Meaulnes
  - Guillaume Apollinaire – Alcools
  - Joseph Conrad – Chance
  - Sigmund Freud – Totem und Tabu
  - D. H. Lawrence – Sons and Lovers
  - Marcel Proust – Swann's Way, the first volume of A la recherche du temps perdu
  - Siegfried Sassoon – The Daffodil Murderer (Note: From The Weald of Youth (1913). John Masefield's The Daffodil Fields had been published in March 1913. A review by Edmund Blunden in 1942 explains: "The Daffodil Murderer was the outcome of a rapt admiration, such as so many felt for Mr. Masefield's Everlasting Mercy [a poem set in Ledbury, Herefordshire]. It began as a kind of parody; it grew into a serious dramatic tale. To quote Gosse: "It treats a Masefield subject exactly in Masefield's own manner, as if you had actually got into Masefield's own skin and spoke with his voice. There is nothing comic about it." ")
- Music
  - Manuel de Falla – La vida breve
  - Alexander Scriabin – the last two piano sonatas
  - Igor Stravinsky – The Rite of Spring (May 29)
