= Early life of Pope Pius XII =

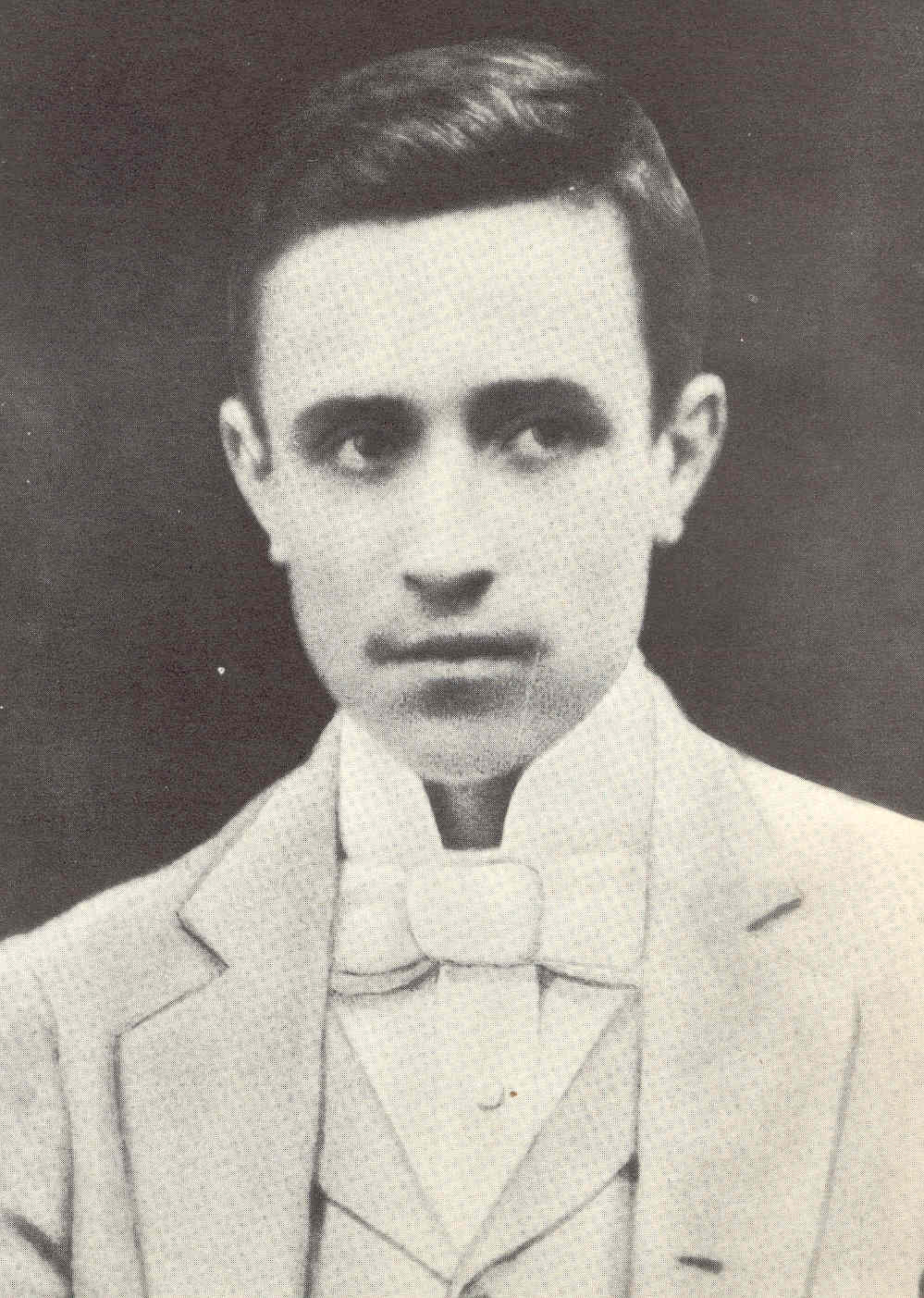
Eugenio Pacelli in 1896

Eugenio Maria Giuseppe Giovanni Pacelli (later Pope Pius XII) was born March 2, 1876, to Filippo Pacelli and Virginia (Graziosi) Pacelli, in Rome, where he spent his childhood. He was ordained as a priest on April 2, 1899.

== Family background ==
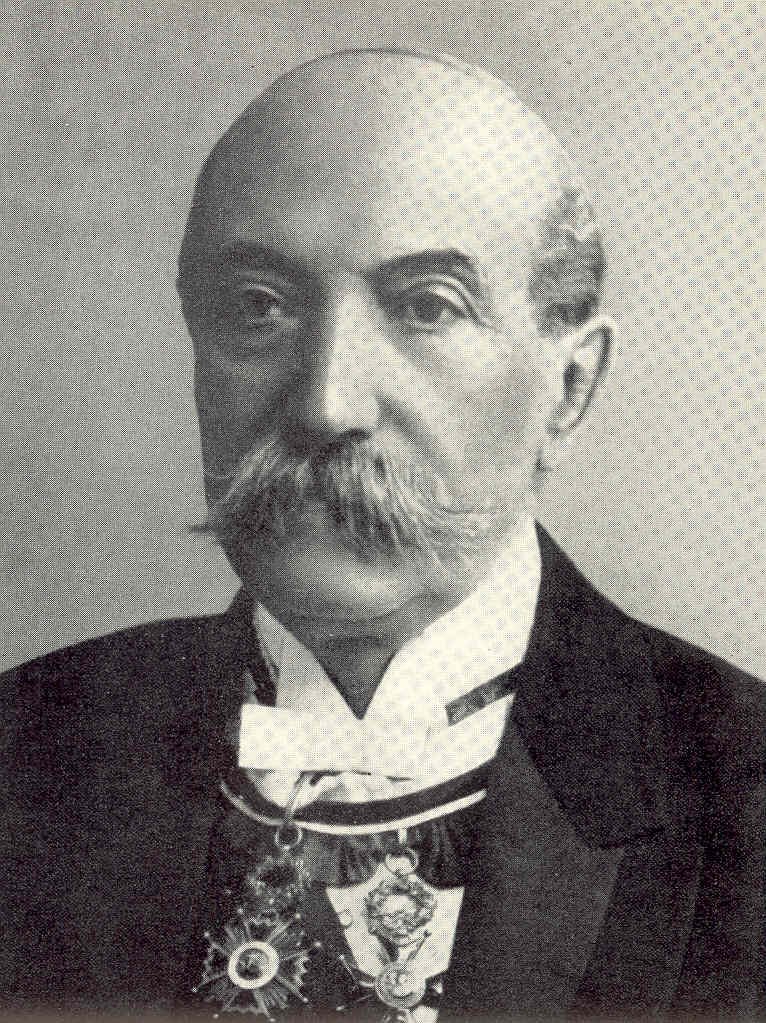
Papa Filippo Pacelli 1837-1916

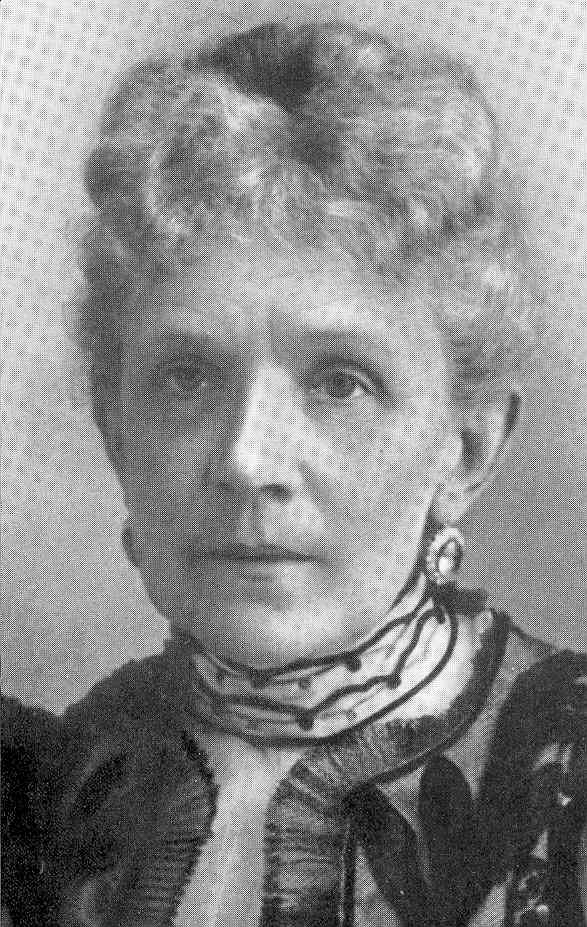
Mama Virginia Pacelli 1844-1920

Eugenio was born into a family which, for most of the 19th century, was in service to the Holy See. The Pacelli family had a long tradition of legal training. His grandfather, Marcantonio Pacelli, had been minister of finance for Pope Gregory XVI and deputy minister of the interior under Pope Pius IX from 1851 to 1870. He founded the L’Osservatore Romano on July 20, 1860. His father Filippo Pacelli, was a solicitor (lawyer) in the Congregation of the Sacred Rota. His brother, Francesco Pacelli, a Vatican lawyer as well, was dean of the lawyers of the Rota He was also the legal advisor to Pius XI, in which role he negotiated the Lateran Treaty in 1929, bringing an end to the Roman Question. It established the independence of the Papacy with the formation of Vatican City as a sovereign entity. In his Diario della Conciliazione, Francesco Pacelli described the details and difficulties of these negotiations from a Vatican perspective.

The family's parish church in Rome was the Chiesa Nuova where the body of St. Philip Neri was under the altar in a silver casket. Neri, with his unending sense of humor and love for education, music, and culture, was one of the great heroes of young Eugenio Pacelli. Eugenio served as an altar boy at Chiesa Nuova, and, after his ordination as a priest, took weekly confessions there. Eugenio was the third of four children, the second son. Two days after his birth, he was baptized at the Church of Saints Celso and Giuliano by his uncle, Monsignor Giuseppe Pacelli. His godparents were his maternal uncle Filippo Graziosi and paternal aunt Teresa Pacelli. In the apartment where he grew up, there was a shrine of the Madonna with a prie-dieu at which Pacelli would frequently pray.

== Education ==
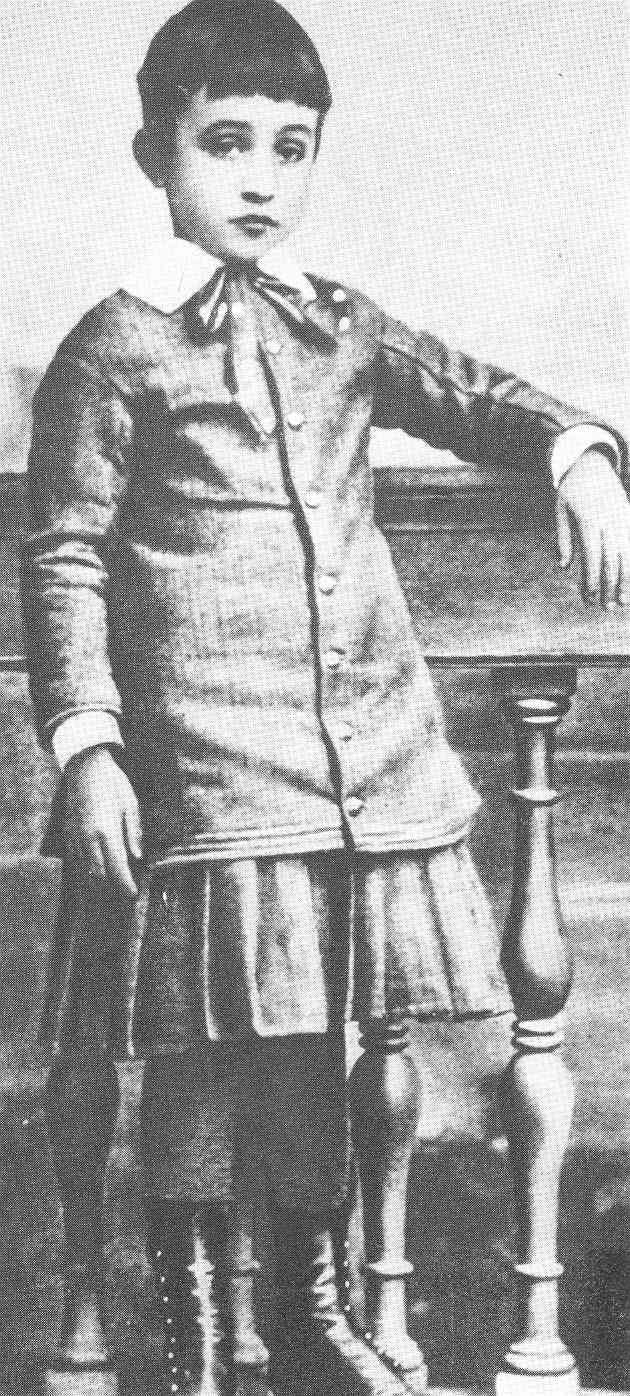
Eugenio at the age of six in 1882

At age five, Eugenio was enrolled in a kindergarten conducted by the French Sisters of Providence, in what is now known as Via Zanardelli. In 1939, a bust of Pius XII was unveiled at the school. He graduated to a private Catholic elementary school in the Piazza Santa Lucia dei Ginnasi. After elementary school, Eugenio began his studies at the Ennio Quirino Visconti Lyceum. Under the direction of the Jesuits, it was a semi-military academy under governmental control. Here he learned several languages, including Latin. Eugenio carried the influence of his parents and Father with him into his secularized (Liceo). For an essay assignment on a "favorite" historical figure, Eugenio is said to have chosen Augustine of Hippo, prompting sneers from his classmates. When he attempted to expand a little on the history of Christian civilization, a theme absent in the curriculum, his teacher chided him, informing him that he was not employed to take the lesson. At age twelve, he announced that he would enter the priesthood, rather than becoming a lawyer like most of his family. Nobody was surprised, said his sister Elisabetta Pacelli.

=== Eugenio's self-portrait ===
Thirteen years old, Eugenio was asked by his Professor Ignazio Bassi, to write a self-portrait, which is one of several school essays of Eugenio Pacelli in original school books.

  - I am thirteen years old and for this age I am, as one can see, neither very tall nor small. My figure is slender, the colour of my skin brown, my face rather pale, my hair chestnut and soft, my eyes black, my nose rather bent. I will not say much of my chest, which to be true, is not very big. I have a pair of long and thin legs, and two feet, not minor size. From all this, one can understand, that physically, I am an average young man.
  - Nature awarded me with sufficient gifts, so I may with good will, do many things. …I am inspired by the classics and the study of Latin gives me the highest sense of enjoyment. Since I love music, I enjoy playing an instrument in my free time especially during vacations.
  - My character is pretty impatient and strong. But I feel an obligation to modify it through education. I am comforted, to see that in my heart resides an instinctive generosity. As I won’t tolerate disagreement, I easily forgive those, who insult me. I hope that age and reflection will contribute to a disappearance of the damaging shortcomings, which I recognize. It seems I have said the truth”.

=== Self-discipline ===
Being somewhat sickly, he tried to overcome this physical disability with exercise and sports. In his family summer home in Onano, he would ride horses, swim, and canoe in Lake Bolzena. Eugenio hiked frequently. Throughout his life to his old age, he undertook long daily walks and morning exercises. Discipline, allowed him to find time for his favourite musical instrument, the violin, which he played often and “so well, that he might have participated in an orchestra”. He preferred to play classical and romantic German composers such as Bach, Mozart, Beethoven and Mendelssohn. He had a passion for acting and public speaking. "This was his way of overcoming shyness and an early speech defect, with determination and energy". He was also interested in stamp collecting and Archaeology. The latter would manifest itself years later in Divino afflante Spiritu, in which he encouraged going back to the language, culture, and society of ancient Israel, in order to better understand the Old Testament.

To gain time for his many interests, Eugenio from early on forced himself to methodical work and prayer habits. He confirmed later, that he liked to pray and study as a child, and that he never really understood, why other people would talk or do nothing, rather than pray and study.

=== Theology ===
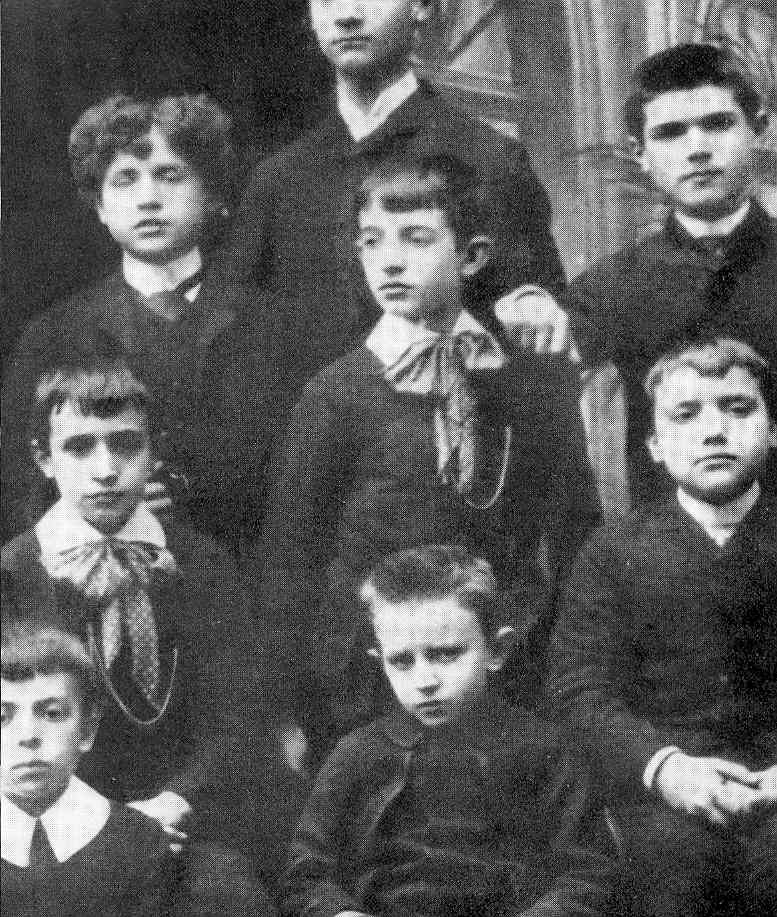
Eugenio center left at the age of ten

Theology and the Catholic Church were not popular in late 19th-century Italy. Following the hostile takeover of papal Rome by Italian forces in 1870, religion was banned from public schools. Positivist philosophies were politically popular. The Catholic Church was seen as a reactionary enemy of the Italian people. In 1894, at the age of 18, he entered the Capranica Seminary and enrolled at the Gregorian University. At the end of his first academic year, he dropped out of both the Capranica and the Gregorian University. According to his sister, the food at the Capranica was to blame; his "fastidious" stomach would plague him for the rest of his life, suggesting a nervous, high-strung constitution. He lived at home (an unprecedented dispensation) while continuing his studies at the Sapienza School of Philosophy, and the Papal Athenaeum of St. Apollinaris Institute for Theology in the autumn of 1895. He received Baccalaureate and Licentiate degrees summa cum laude. His frail health prevented his participation in the graduation ceremony. Records show that he graduated with highest honors and is reported to have had a photographic memory.

== Ordination ==
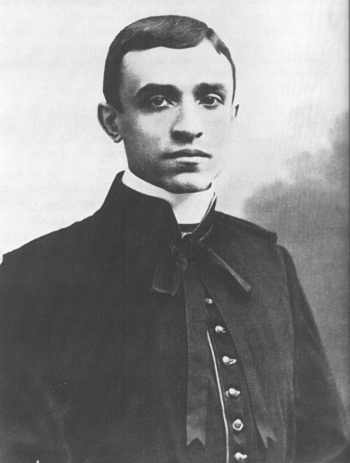
Pacelli on the day of his ordination, April 21, 1899

Eugenio Pacelli was ordained on Easter Sunday, April 2, 1899 and celebrated his first mass the following day in Borghese Chapel of the Basilica of Saint Mary Major in Rome at the altar of "Salus Populi Romano", where in 1949, fifty years later he celebrated the anniversary. Vicenzo Cardinal Vanutelli attended his first mass as did his spiritual guides, Monsignor Azzochi and Father Lais and his family. He celebrated his second mass at his favorite church Chiesa Nuova April 4, 1899 on the altar of Philip Neri.

== Beginning Vatican Service ==
A few weeks thereafter, on the Feast of Corpus Christi, the young Priest Eugenio Pacelli gave his first major sermon, which he concluded with these words:

- Christ accepts all the calumnies and accusations and asks only for our hearts, so He can lighten the fire of His love and spread His kingdom all over the earth. Today, let us replace ungratefulness with our love and thus warm up His heart. Today, we go to Jesus with humility and love, ashamed of our misery and unworthiness. Like the Blind, we near the fountain of eternal clarity".

Pacelli was initially assigned to Chiesa Nuova as an assistant. Shortly afterwards, he was at home playing his favourite violin, when an unannounced visitor from the Vatican showed up. Monsignor Pietro Gasparri came, to ask for help in the Vatican bureaucracy. Pacelli was not impressed, telling Gaparri, "This is not why I became a priest”. Pacelli wanted to work with real people, doing parish work. “I understand”, replied Gasparri, “you want to be a Shepherd and I turn you into a sheep dog”. But there are many mansions. All service to the Church is pastoral. And he continued describing the important work in the State department of the Vatican. Eugenio Pacelli accepted and was introduced to Cardinal Mariano Rampolla, the Secretary of State and to Pope Leo XIII in 1901. This started a career, which ended with the death of Pope Pius XII, October 9, 1958.

== Quotations from Young Eugenio ==
=== Good books ===
Eugenio loved to read. Favourites included Saint Augustine, Cicero and Manzoni. In 1889, at age 13, Pacelli describes a good book as man's best friend.

- A good book is not only useful, it gives us joy, enriching our spirit with new knowledge, and educating our emotions with noble feelings. A good book is always useful. In good times, it enriches our joy, in bad times, it provides consolation and strength, . It teaches us, to accept the tragedies of life. A good book will never leave us. It will not change, its principles will not change either. From all this, one can easily understand, why a good book is the best of friends.

=== Enemies ===
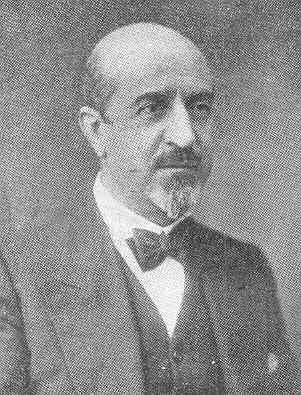
Brother Francesco Pacelli was the right-hand man for Pietro Gasparri during the Lateran Treaty negotiations

The date of this last school essay is March 1894, when he was 17, almost 18 years old. The topic “my enemies” was not of Pacelli’s choosing, it was given to Eugenio Pacelli and the other students by his professor as a project for the whole class.

- As a child I saw in long sleepless nights bad, ugly, black fairies dancing around me. Fairies, who are the enemies of good children and as these terrible faces appeared in front of me, changing into ever more terrible appearances, I put my head under the covers. One could say, that they were anticipations, what will happen later in life.
- I will have enemies, no doubt. Some of my ideas, may be a little original. Some may be not totally correct in the opinion of others, although I am convinced of their goodness. Some of my ideas I will pronounce with a loud voice, and may be with a careless openness. All this will create enemies, hate and vengeance. But this will not hold me back, or, not to mention, give up.
- Of course, everybody acts different against his enemies. Some get really angry, others highly upset, others are incapable of reacting and fall into resignation. ... I am going after what is for me the cure of all pain, which makes me forget everything bad, 'study'.
- When I have to fight against my enemies, I develop a powerful drive to do studies, strong, and numerous as never before. The prospect of the great works illuminates and strengthens me. This is my revenge.

== Sources ==
- Piero Bargellini, Il Pastore Angelico, Pio XII, Roma, 1950
- Gilla Gremini, Il Santo Padre Pio XII, Tipografia Poliglotta Vaticana, 1943
- Alden Hatch, Seamus Walshe, Crown of Glory, The life of Pope Pius XII, New York, 1956
- Sr. Pascalina Lehnert, La Profondità di un'anima da una testimonianza vivente, in: Rivista delle Religiose, 1968, 12
- Sr Pascalina Lehnert, Ich durfte ihm dienen, Erinnerungen an Papst Pius XII, Würzburg, 1985
- Ilse Lore Konopatzki, Eugenio Pacelli, Pius XII. Kindheit und Jugend in Dokumenten, Pustet, Salzburg und München, 1974
- Margherita Marchione
- Burkhart Schneider, Pio XII, Pace, Opera della Giustizia, Torino, 1984
- C. Verwoort, Pius XII, Pergamon, Antwerpen, 1949
- Otto Walter Pius XI, Leben und Persönlichkeit, Olten und Freiburg, 1941
