= Die Augen der Mumie Ma =

1918 film directed by Ernst Lubitsch

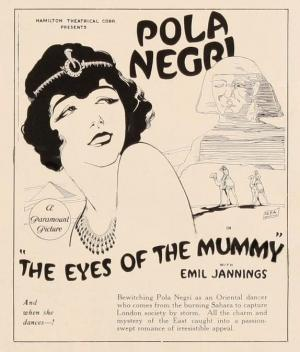
- US release poster
- Directed by: Ernst Lubitsch
- Written by: Hanns Kräly; Emil Rameau
- Produced by: Paul Davidson
- Starring: Pola Negri; Emil Jannings
- Cinematography: Theodor Sparkuhl; Alfred Hansen
- Production company: PAGU
- Distributed by: UFA
- Release date: 3 October 1918
- Running time: 63 minutes
- Country: Germany
- Language: Silent film

Die Augen der Mumie Ma (English: The Eyes of the Mummy or The Eyes of the Mummy Ma) is a 1918 German silent horror film directed by Ernst Lubitsch. The film stars Pola Negri and Emil Jannings. It was the first collaboration between Lubitsch and Negri, a pairing that would go on to make worldwide successes such as Carmen (1918), Madame Dubarry (1919), and Sumurun (1920).

== Plot ==
A young, wealthy painter named Wendland travels to Egypt, where he hears about the tomb of Queen Ma, a site far out into the desert that has reportedly driven everyone who has visited it mad. Intrigued, the painter arranges to be taken to the tomb. When he arrives, he is greeted by an Egyptian native named Radu, who leads him to a coffin in a dark room. There he sees the eyes behind the coffin slowly open and come to life, just before the Egyptian tries to attack him. The painter wards off Radu, and finds that the coffin lid is actually an entrance to a small adjacent room, where a helpless young girl, also named Ma, is held prisoner by the Egyptian's Svengali-like hypnotic powers. Wendland rescues Ma from the site and takes her back to Europe with him, making her his wife. Radu, heartbroken at losing Ma, wanders into the desert and faints on the hot sands. A wealthy prince finds him, nurses him back to health, and makes him his personal servant. When Radu comes to, he swears vengeance on Ma for leaving him.

Wendland hires a tutor to introduce Ma to European manners and customs, and then throws a party to introduce her to his friends. When Ma begins dancing a Middle Eastern dance at the party, she attracts the interest of a vaudeville manager, who signs her to a contract. A few months into Ma's success on the vaudeville circuit, the prince decides to go to one of the shows she appears in and takes his servant Radu with him. When Radu sees Ma on stage, he hypnotizes her from across the room, and she faints in the middle of her act.

Much later, the prince visits an art exhibit, which includes some paintings by Wendland. He is particularly taken by a portrait of Ma, and invites Wendland and Ma to see his personal collection. After viewing the collection, the three sit down to tea, only for Ma to see Radu from behind in a reflection in a mirror. She goes into a trance, faints, and becomes ill. Sometime after recovering from the illness, the prince gives Radu a letter to deliver to Wendland, telling Wendland he will purchase the painting of Ma, which is already in his possession. When they receive the letter, Ma tells Wendland to go to the prince and cancel the purchase, which he does. In the meantime, Radu spots the painting, realizes it was painted by the same man he delivered the letter to, stabs the painting with his dagger and rushes to Wendland's home in search of Ma. When Wendland arrives to discuss the matter with the prince, they go into the room and see Radu's dagger in the painting. Immediately after, they receive a report of a break-in at Wendland's house. Realizing what is happening, they rush there. Before they arrive, Radu enters Wendland's home, and hypnotizes Ma once more, only to accidentally kill Ma in the process. Realizing what he has done, he stabs himself with his own knife. The prince and Wendland arrive too late and find the two lying dead on the floor.

== Cast ==
- Pola Negri as Ma
- Emil Jannings as Radu
- Harry Liedtke as Albert Wendland
- Max Laurence as Prince Hohenfels
- Margarete Kupfer

== Production ==
According to the intertitles of some of the release prints, director and then-stage and film actor Ernst Lubitsch had been making a popular series of comedies for UFA, and convinced producer Paul Davidson to "support him in making his artistic dream come true of producing an elaborate film drama". The film was produced on location in Egypt and in a German chalk quarry called Rüdesdorfer Kalkberge. The main actors were reportedly paid 35 marks a day for their work.

== Release ==
Die Augen der Mumie Ma was released theatrically by UFA in Germany on 3 October 1918 at the Ufa-Pavillon am Nollendorfplatz, Berlin. It was released in the US on 25 June 1922 by Paramount Pictures as The Eyes of the Mummy.

The film was digitally restored by the National Film Archive and screened on Turner Classic Movies for the first time on 6 October 2002. That same month, Grapevine Video released the film on home video. Alpha Video released the film as a budget-priced DVD on 28 March 2006. It was released on DVD again in 2011 by Bright Shining City Productions as part of the 3-DVD set Pola Negri: The Iconic Collection.

== Reception ==
Although Die Augen der Mumie Ma was a success upon its initial release in Germany, modern response to the film has largely been mediocre, with the film receiving an average review of 5.4 on the Internet Movie Database from 291 users as of 28 November 2012. The Pola Negri Appreciation Site defends the film, praising the film's dramatic storyline and the climactic scene at the end of the film where Radu kills Ma.
