= The Street Song =

1931 film

- Directed by: Lupu Pick
- Written by: Johannes Brandt
- Produced by: Lupu Pick
- Cinematography: Robert Baberske; Eugen Schüfftan
- Edited by: L. Kish
- Music by: Marc Roland
- Production company: Deutsche Lichtspiel-Syndikat
- Distributed by: Deutsche Lichtspiel-Syndikat
- Release date: 2 April 1931
- Running time: 97 minutes
- Country: Germany
- Language: German

The Street Song or The Streetsweeper (German: Gassenhauer) is a 1931 German musical crime film directed by Lupu Pick and starring Ina Albrecht, Ernst Busch and Albert Hoermann. The film was shot at the Grunewald Studios. It is a Berlin-set film, with sets designed by art director Robert Neppach. It premiered at the Ufa-Pavillon am Nollendorfplatz in the German capital. The film was a considerable public success and one of its songs, "Marie, Marie," by the Comedian Harmonists, became a hit record. A separate French-language version, Les Quatre Vagabonds with a different cast and music was also made.

== Cast ==
- Ina Albrecht as Marie
- Ernst Busch as Peter
- Albert Hoermann as Paul
- Hans Deppe as Max
- Martin Jacob as Emil
- Wolfgang Staudte as Gustav
- Karl Hannemann as Hausverwalter Nowack
- Margarete Schön as Emma
- Willi Schaeffers as Impresario
- Werner Hollmann as Untersuchungsrichter
- Werner Pledath as Kommisar
- Rudolf Biebrach as Aufseher
- Hans Leibelt as Kriminalinspektor
- María Dalbaicín as Taenzerin
- Michael von Newlinsky as Tänzer
- Rudolf Blümner as Mann am Telefon
- Comedian Harmonists as Themselves
- Gustav Püttjer
- Albert Florath
