= Francesco Pacelli =

Italian lawyer

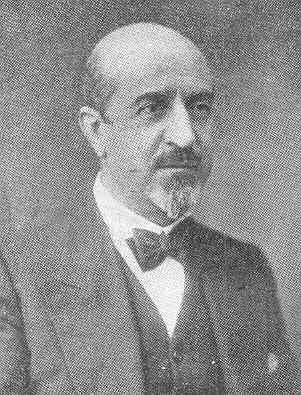
Francesco Pacelli

Francesco Pacelli (1 February 1872 – 22 April 1935), a nobleman of Acquapendente and Sant'Angelo in Vado, was an Italian lawyer and expert in canon law. He was the elder brother of Eugenio Pacelli, who later became Pope Pius XII. As a lay legal advisor to Pope Pius XI, Pacelli played a key role in assisting Pietro Gasparri, then the Cardinal Secretary of State, during the negotiation of the 1929 Lateran Treaty with Benito Mussolini, which established the independence of the Vatican City State and in so doing resolved the longstanding Roman Question.

== Background ==
Francesco Pacelli was born in Rome into an upper-class family of intense Catholic piety with a history of ties to the papacy (the "Black Nobility"), which for most of the 19th century was in service to the Holy See. The Pacelli family had a long tradition of legal training. His grandfather, Marcantonio Pacelli, Noble of Acquapendente and Noble of Sant'Angelo in Vado (titles granted to the family in 1853 and 1858), had been Under-Secretary in the Papal Ministry of Finance for Pope Gregory XVI and then Secretary of the Interior under Pope Pius IX from 1851 to 1870. He founded the L’Osservatore Romano on 20 July 1860. His father Filippo Pacelli (Rome, 1 September 1837 - Rome, 20 November 1916), Noble of Acquapendente and Noble of Sant'Angelo in Vado, a Franciscan tertiary, was a Consistorial Lawyer, a Solicitor or Lawyer in the Congregation of the Sacred Roman Rota and the Dean of Lawyers of the Holy See, who in 1871 married the Noble Virginia Graziosi (13 December 1844 - 10 February 1920). His sisters were Giuseppa Pacelli (Rome, 3 July 1872 - Rome, 8 August 1955), Roman Noble, Noble of Acquapendente and Noble of Sant'Angelo in Vado, married on 8 May 1902 to Ettore, 1st Count (from 23 May 1946) Mengarini (Rome, 1 February 1872 -), and Elisabetta Pacelli (Rome, 28 June 1880 - Rome, 23 May 1970), Roman Noble, Noble of Acquapendente and Noble of Sant'Angelo in Vado, married on 12 May 1914 to Noble Luigi Rossignani (Rome, 21 June 1874 - Rome, 22 February 1948). His nephew, Ernesto Pacelli, Noble of Acquapendente and Noble of Sant'Angelo in Vado, was a key financial advisor to Pope Leo XIII, Pope Pius X and Pope Benedict XV.

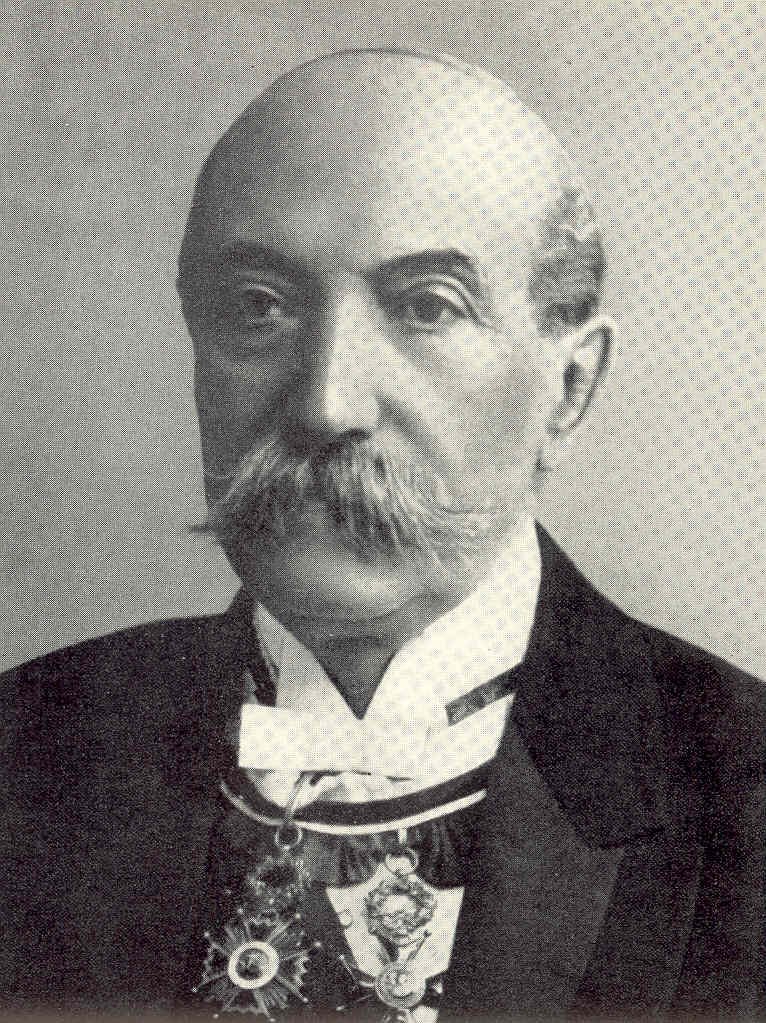
Filippo Pacelli, his father.

His brother, Eugenio Pacelli, was ordained a priest on Easter Sunday, 2 April 1899, by Bishop Francesco di Paola Cassetta — the vice-regent of Rome and a family friend. After entering Vatican service, he was also chosen by Pope Leo XIII to deliver condolences on behalf of the Holy See to Edward VII of the United Kingdom upon the death of Queen Victoria. In 1908, he served as a representative of the Holy See on the International Eucharistic Congress in London, where he met Winston Churchill. In 1911, he represented the Holy See at the coronation of King George V. On 23 April 1917, Pope Benedict XV appointed Pacelli titular Archbishop of Sardis and papal nuncio to Bavaria, consecrating him a bishop in the Sistine Chapel on 13 May 1917. It was the same day on which Our Lady of Fatima is believed to have first appeared to three shepherd children in Fatima, Portugal. Several years later, on 23 June 1920, Pacelli was appointed Nuncio to Germany, and after completion of a concordat with Bavaria, the nunciature was moved to Berlin, Prussia, in 1925.

== Lateran Treaty ==
Francesco Pacelli was dean of the lawyers of the Rota and legal advisor to Pope Pius XI. In this role, he was instrumental in negotiating what later became known as the Lateran Treaty in 1929. Its terms reaffirmed the independence of the Papacy (the Holy See) along with the formation of the new Vatican City State as a sovereign entity. Francesco Pacelli described in his Diario della Conciliazione the details and difficulties of these negotiations from the perspective of the Holy See. Pope Pius XI and Pietro Gasparri had entrusted to Pacelli the daily negotiations for the Lateran Treaty. To this end, Pacelli had over two hundred protracted audiences with Pius XI regarding twenty successive draft versions of what eventually became the definitive treaty.

After long negotiations, the cluster of agreements consisted of three parts, which were ratified on 7 June 1929, ending the "Roman Question". There were three documents: A political treaty recognizing the full sovereignty of the Holy See in the State of Vatican City, which was thereby established; a concordat regulating the position of the Catholic Church and the Catholic religion in the Italian state, and a financial convention agreed on as a definitive settlement of the claims of the Holy See following the losses of its territories and property. Pius XI declared that with the treaties negotiated by Pacelli, "God had been given back to Italy and Italy to God". In gratitude for his efforts, the Pope bestowed on Francesco Pacelli the hereditary title of Marquess and Roman Noble by a Papal Brief of 9 June 1929 and granted him the addition of the coat of arms of the Holy See by a Papal Brief of 6 June 1931. By Royal Letters Patent of 26 February 1931, the King of Italy authorized Pacelli to use his arms in Italy and to use the title of Noble on 7 June 1934 by Royal Decree of 4 October 1934 and Royal Letters Patent dated 22 November 1935 for his children, and posthumously bestowed on him the title of Prince.

== Relation with Eugenio Pacelli (Pope Pius XII) ==
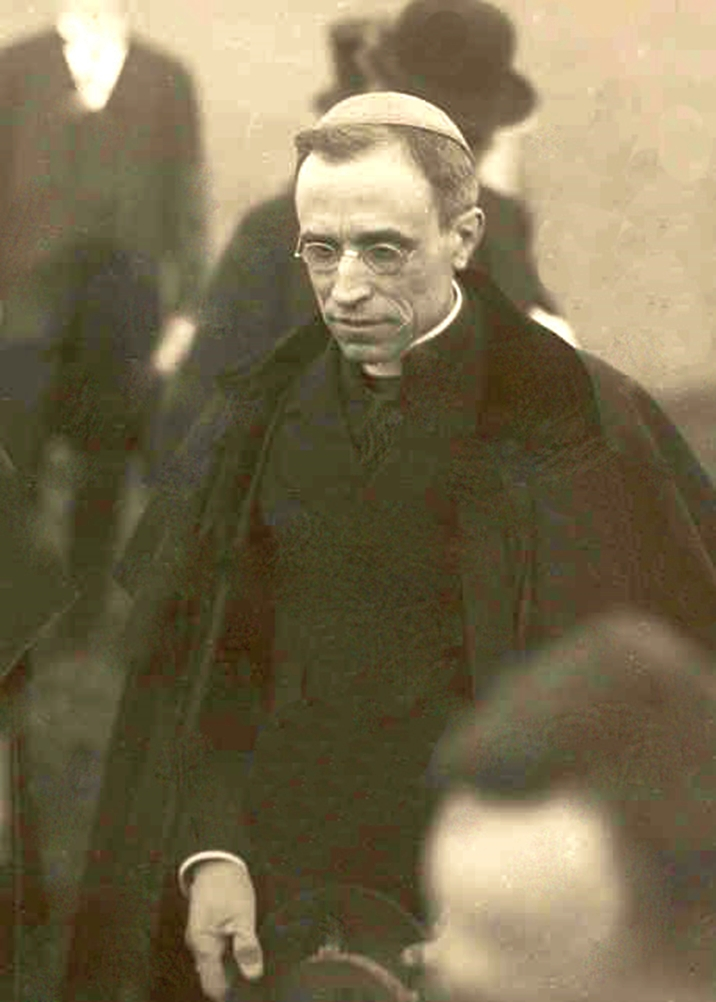
Eugenio Pacelli, Francesco's younger brother

After his brother Francesco had successfully concluded the historic Lateran Treaty, Eugenio Pacelli was called to Rome by Pope Pius XI and on 7 February 1930 appointed as Cardinal Secretary of State, succeeding his mentor and friend Pietro Gasparri. Francesco Pacelli left the immediate Vatican service largely in light of concerns for his health problems. As he moved to Rome, Eugenio Pacelli stayed for several weeks in the house of his brother Francesco near the Vatican, because the Vatican quarters required renovations. Madre Pascalina described the atmosphere in the Pacelli home as plain but elegant. Francesco was the soul of the house, since his wife had died years earlier. Comparing the two brothers, the older Francesco Pacelli appeared to Madre Pascalina to be slightly more severe than the younger Eugenio Pacelli.

The two Pacelli brothers lived there together with the children of Francesco: Carlo, Giuseppe, a Jesuit who died shortly thereafter, Marcantonio and Giulio Pacelli. The household was in the hands of Carlo Pacelli's wife. Eugenio Pacelli lived in a small apartment within the house, which Francesco had reserved for him during his years in Germany and which he had used in previous years during his Rome visits. It consisted of two small rooms and a chapel, where Francesco Pacelli and the family met every morning for Holy Mass and evenings for reciting the rosary.

== Illness and death ==
The stress of daily negotiations over the decades-old Roman Question with the Italian dictator Benito Mussolini on behalf of the Holy See had effects on the health of Francesco Pacelli. He developed a progressive heart ailment which in the last years forced him to gradually reduce his workload, fully knowing the implications of his slowdown. "I attempted to serve God, his Holy Church and my family, he remarked shortly before his death. I trust, he will protect them, and I hope to find a compassionate judge." Francesco Pacelli died in Rome on 22 April 1935, aged 63.

== Marriage and issue ==
He married Luigia Filippini-Lera, who died on 21 August 1920, and had:

- Carlo, Prince and Marquess Pacelli (Rome, 29 November 1903 - Rome, 6 August 1970), Roman Noble, Noble of Acquapendente and Noble of Sant'Angelo in Vado, granting the title of Marquis for himself and his brothers by motu proprio of the King of Italy on 25 November 1941 and Prince by motu proprio of the King of Italy on 23 November 1942 (also extended to the brothers Marcantonio and Giulio), Lawyer, married Marcella Benucci, without issue
- Giuseppe Pacelli (Rome, 6 August 1905 - Roma, 31 March 1928), Noble of Acquapendente and Noble of Sant'Angelo in Vado, Jesuit novice
- Marcantonio, Prince and Marquess Pacelli (Rome, 16 May 1907 - Rome, 31 December 2006), Roman Noble, Noble of Acquapendente and Noble of Sant'Angelo in Vado, extension of the title of Marquis for himself and his brother Giulio with Pontifical Brief dated 14 July 1940, granting the title of Marquis for himself and his brothers by motu proprio of the King of Italy on 25 November 1941 and Prince by motu proprio of the King of Italy on 23 November 1942 (also extended to the brothers Carlo and Giulio), Rotal Lawyer, Brigadier General of the Papal Noble Guard, married in Lugo on 27 April 1936 Gabriella Ricci-Bartoloni (Lugo, 15 August 1912 - Rome, 15 June 2006), Noble of Pesaro, daughter of Giulio Ricci-Bartoloni, Noble of Pesaro, and wife Angiolina Mordenti, and had:
  - Orsola Pacelli (Rome, 16 January 1937), Roman Noble, Noble of Acquapendente and Noble of Sant'Angelo in Vado, married in October 1963 Dr. Giuliano Daddi (29 October 1936)
  - Francesco, Prince and Marquess Pacelli (Rome, 4 February 1939), Roman Noble, Noble of Acquapendente and Noble of Sant'Angelo in Vado, married on 26 October 1991 Giorgia Carolei, daughter of Franco Carolei and wife Noble Anna Maria Cantuti-Castelvetri of the Counts of Ligonchio, and had:
    - Marcantonio Pacelli (Rome, 24 August 1992), Roman Noble, Noble of Acquapendente and Noble of Sant'Angelo in Vado
    - Eugenia Pacelli (Rome, 25 July 1994), Roman Noble, Noble of Acquapendente and Noble of Sant'Angelo in Vado
  - Filippo Pacelli (Rome, 13 February 1941), Roman Noble, Noble of Acquapendente and Noble of Sant'Angelo in Vado, married in Florence on 15 June 1968 Maria Antonietta Campedelli, and had:
    - Andrea Pacelli (Rome, 11 November 1969), Roman Noble, Noble of Acquapendente and Noble of Sant'Angelo in Vado, married in Pietrasanta on 25 July 2002 Marta Cosaro, and had:
      - Luca Pacelli (Rome, 23 September 2005), Roman Noble, Noble of Acquapendente and Noble of Sant'Angelo in Vado, twin with the below
      - Matteo Pacelli (Rome, 23 September 2005), Roman Noble, Noble of Acquapendente and Noble of Sant'Angelo in Vado, twin with the above
    - Ascanio Pacelli (Rome, 29 November 1973), Roman Noble, Noble of Acquapendente and Noble of Sant'Angelo in Vado, married at the Castello Odescalchi, in Bracciano, on 30 April 2005 Katia Pedrotti (Sondrio, 28 September 1978), and had:
      - Matilda Pacelli (Rome, 12 November 2007), Roman Noble, Noble of Acquapendente and Noble of Sant'Angelo in Vado
- Giulio, Prince and Marquess Pacelli (Rome, 11 May 1910 - Rome, 9 October 1984), Roman Noble, Noble of Acquapendente and Noble of Sant'Angelo in Vado, extension of the title of Marquis for himself and his brother Marcantonio with Pontifical Brief dated 14 July 1940, granting the title of Marquis for himself and his brothers by motu proprio of the King of Italy on 25 November 1941 and Prince by motu proprio of the King of Italy on 23 November 1942 (also extended to the brothers Carlo and Marcantonio), married in Rome on 25 July 1940 Piera Bombrini (Sori, 9 February 1913 - Rome, 27 April 1999), daughter of Marquess Carlo Bombrini and wife Amalita Ottone, and had:
  - Amalia Pacelli, Roman Noble, Noble of Acquapendente and Noble of Sant'Angelo in Vado, married on 19 June 1969 Vittorio Barattieri di San Pietro (Corfu, 10 April 1943)
  - Eugenio Pacelli, Roman Noble, Nobleman of Acquapendente and Nobleman of Sant'Angelo in Vado, unmarried and without issue
