= Ernesto Pacelli =

Ernesto Pacelli

Ernesto Pacelli (31 August 1860 – 13 June 1925), Nobleman of Acquapendente and Nobleman of Sant'Angelo in Vado, was a financial adviser to Pope Leo XIII, Pope Pius X, and Pope Benedict XV and the founder and president of the Banco di Roma from 9 March 1880 until 1916. Pacelli also served as an unofficial link between the Vatican and the Italian government. Papal historian John Pollard calls him the "first of the great laymen to be associated with the finances of the Holy See."

He was a cousin of Francesco Pacelli, a nephew of Filippo Pacelli and grandson of Marcantonio Pacelli. His cousin, Eugenio Pacelli, became Pope Pius XII.

== Career ==
Pacelli's involvement in the Vatican began when he secured financial compensation for Leo XIII from the Italian government in the aftermath of the collapse of the Banco Romano, the former bank of the Papal States.

Pacelli discreetly supplied financial advice and loans, and jobs to relatives of several prominent members of the Roman Curia, notably Pietro Gasparri. Lai speculates that this may have contributed to a perception of Gasparri as nepotistic in the 1922 papal conclave.

=== Banco di Roma ===
Due to the legal uncertainty of papal assets during the period of the Roman Question, several papal properties and stocks were nominally held in Pacelli's name, in no small part because of his position in the Banco di Roma.

At the time of the election of Pope Benedict XV in 1914, the Holy See owned 25% of the Banco di Roma, and also had large cash deposits at the bank. Following massive public withdrawals from the bank in early 1915, under the spectre of World War I, in March of that year Benedict XV arranged a salvage package to the tune of ₤9 million—guaranteed by the Vatican's shares in the bank—from Credito Nazionale, a subset of the Catholic Banking Federation. This action further aggravated Italian police informants within the Vatican, who in November 1915 began reporting that Benedict XV planned to transform the bank into an essentially Catholic "confessional" institution, and Pacelli was replaced by Carlo Santucci in 1916 as president of the Banco di Roma.

By April 1916, the bank's confidence crisis worsened, and Benedict XV authorized Pacelli, who was deeply indebted to the bank, to hand over 425,000 shares to the bank (purchased for ₤42.5 million but worth less than ₤15 million at the time), which had been held by Pacelli on behalf of the Administration of the Assets of the Holy See (ABSS); Gasparri then authorized Pacelli to hand over another 90,000 shares in return for the proceeds from the sale of Pacelli's villa. Following these handovers, the Vatican no longer controlled any significant shares in the Banco di Roma, although it did still retain deposits.

=== Catholic media ===
In September 1907, Pacelli set up—through the Banco di Roma—the Società Editrice Romana (SER) with ₤150,000 of the bank's capital to bail out the Catholic daily Il Corriere d'Italia. SER would later bail out other Catholic dailies such as L'Avvenire d'Italia in Bologna, L'Italia in Milan, Il Momento in Turin, Il Messaggero Toscano in Pisa, and La Sicilia Cattolica in Palermo.

In November 1907, Pacelli founded Società Tipografica Editrice Romama, also to provide financial assistance to Catholic presses, but with ₤100,000 of the company's ₤150,000 in start-up capital coming directly from the ABSS.

== Quotes ==
If money had a religion it would be Jewish, but fortunately it doesn't have one, as a result of which it can be venerated by everyone.

The financial sacrifices which the Holy See has made for the [Catholic] press are only too well known: to date they have had almost entirely negative results.

== Sources ==
- (in Italian) De Rosa, G. (1984). Storia del Banco di Roma, III.
- (in Italian) Lai, B. (1979). Finanze e finanzieri vaticani tra l'Ottocento e il Novecento da Pio IX a Benedetto XV.
- Pollard, John F. (2005). Money and the Rise of the Modern Papacy: Financing the Vatican, 1850–1950. Cambridge University Press.
