= Pope Pius IX and Italy =

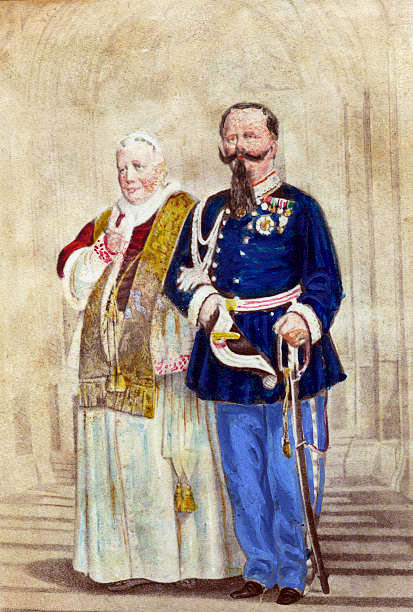
Pope Pius IX with King Victor Emmanuel II of Italy

Foreign relations between Pope Pius IX and Italy were characterized by an extensive political and diplomatic conflict over Italian unification and the subsequent status of Rome after the victory of the liberal revolutionaries.

== Initial liberal reforms ==
As a liberal and aware of the political pressures within the Papal States, Pope Pius IX's first act of a general amnesty for political prisoners did not consider its potential implications and consequences: the freed revolutionaries merely resumed their previous activities, and his concessions only provoked greater demands as patriotic Italian groups sought not only a constitutional government, which he was sympathetic to, but also the Unification of Italy under his leadership and a war of liberation against Catholic Austria, which claimed the northern Italian provinces as its own.

His initial policies created quite a sensation among Italian patriots, both at home and in exile, which is best exemplified by the following letter written by Giuseppe Garibaldi from Montevideo, Uruguay.

If these hands, used to fighting, would be acceptable to His Holiness, we most thankfully dedicate them to the service of him who deserves so well of the Church and the fatherland. Joyful indeed shall we and our companions in whose name we speak be, if we may be allowed to shed our blood in defence of Pio Nono's work of redemption" (12 October 1847)

== 1848 revolution ==
By early 1848, all of Western Europe began to be convulsed in various revolutionary movements. The Pope, who claimed to be above national interests, refused to go to war with Austria, which reversed the up to-now popular view of him in his native Italy. His situation was further complicated by strong opposition to him and his policies within the Vatican and the Papal States, originating in the forces which he had defeated in the papal election two years earlier.

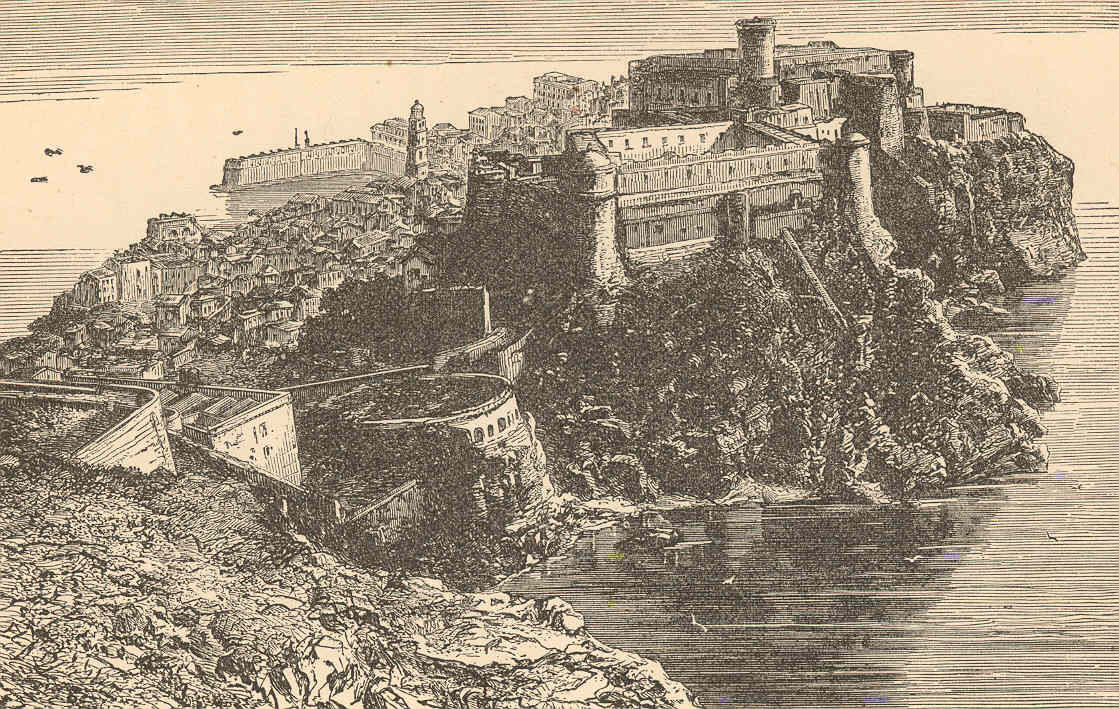
Pius IX lived in exile at the Castle of Gaeta from 1848 to 1850

The Pope had appealed to the Austrian emperor to voluntarily cede the Italian provinces, which was rejected in Vienna, where the liberal policies of Pius IX were viewed with outright contempt. Pius appointed a liberal Pellegrino Rossi as his chief minister for the Papal States, which resulted in additional negative emotions now also directed against Rossi.

In a calculated, well-prepared move, Rossi was assassinated on November 15, 1848, and in the days following, the Swiss Guards were disarmed, making the Pope to a prisoner in his Quirinal. In this public disorder, Pius IX was forced to concede a lay ministry with persons hostile to the Holy See, and a constitution. But public disorder grew, with repeated riots. On 24 November 1848, Pius IX fled Rome, escaping in disguise as a regular priest to Gaeta in the Kingdom of the Two Sicilies, leaving Rome to the radicals and the mob.

== Roman Republic ==
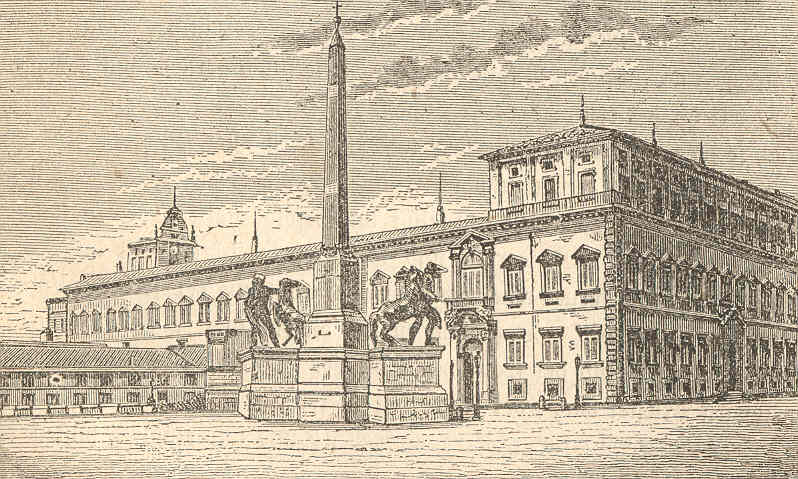
On 15 November 1848 the Swiss Guards were disarmed, making the pope a prisoner in his Quirinal. From then on, Popes lived in the more secure Vatican.

A Roman Republic was declared in February 1849. The Pope responded from his exile by excommunicating all active participants. The Republic was openly hostile to the Catholic Church, celebrating Good Friday with huge fireworks on Saint Peter's Plaza and desecrating Saint Peter's Basilica on Easter Sunday with a secular Republican victory celebration.

The public finances were spent liberally leading to an early financial disaster; palaces, convents and churches were plundered for valuables and artwork. In addition to the official pillaging, private gangs roamed through the city and the countryside, murdering, raping and stealing and spreading fear among the citizens of the Papal States.

== Papal policies in the Papal states ==
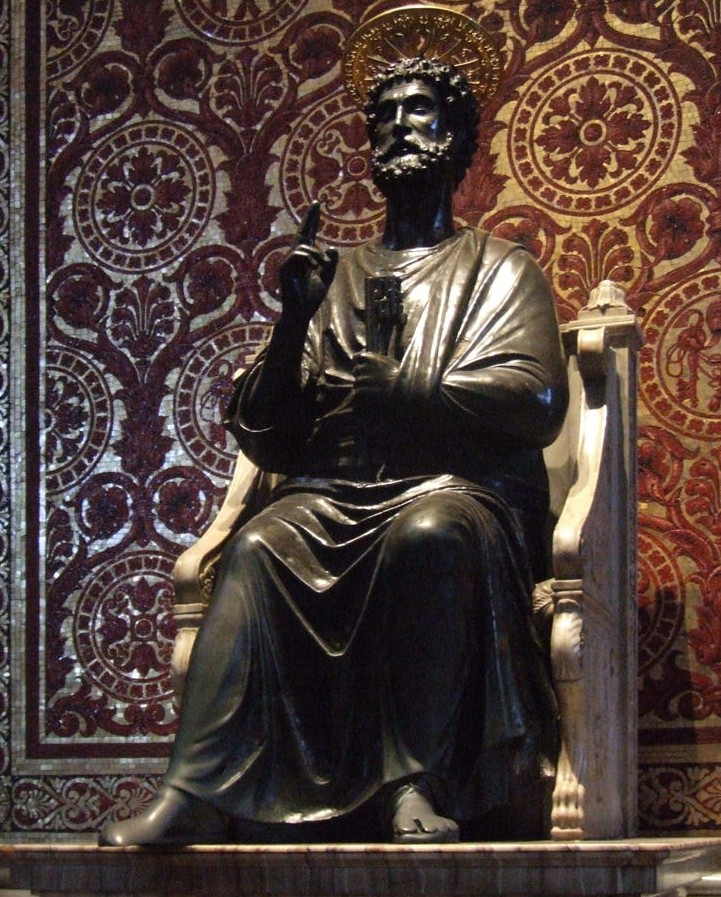
The statue of Saint Peter was placed in the basilica by Pope Pius IX

He visited the hospitals to comfort the wounded and sick but he seemed to have lost both some of his liberal tastes and his confidence in the Romans, who had turned against him in 1848. Pius decided to move his residence from the Quirinal inside Rome to the Vatican, where popes lived ever since. He reformed the governmental structure of the Papal States on 10 September 1850 and its finances on October 28 in the same year. Later he cut his Papal States into twenty provincial units with 1219 communities. These reforms were important but did not have the liberal flavour of his activities before the 1848 revolution. The Cardinal Secretary of State Giacomo Antonelli was now heading a cabinet with five ministers of which three were lay persons. Still, one of the accusations against this regime was its overly clerical nature, with most important positions reserved for the clergy, however some cardinals at that time were not even priests, first of all Giacomo Antonelli.

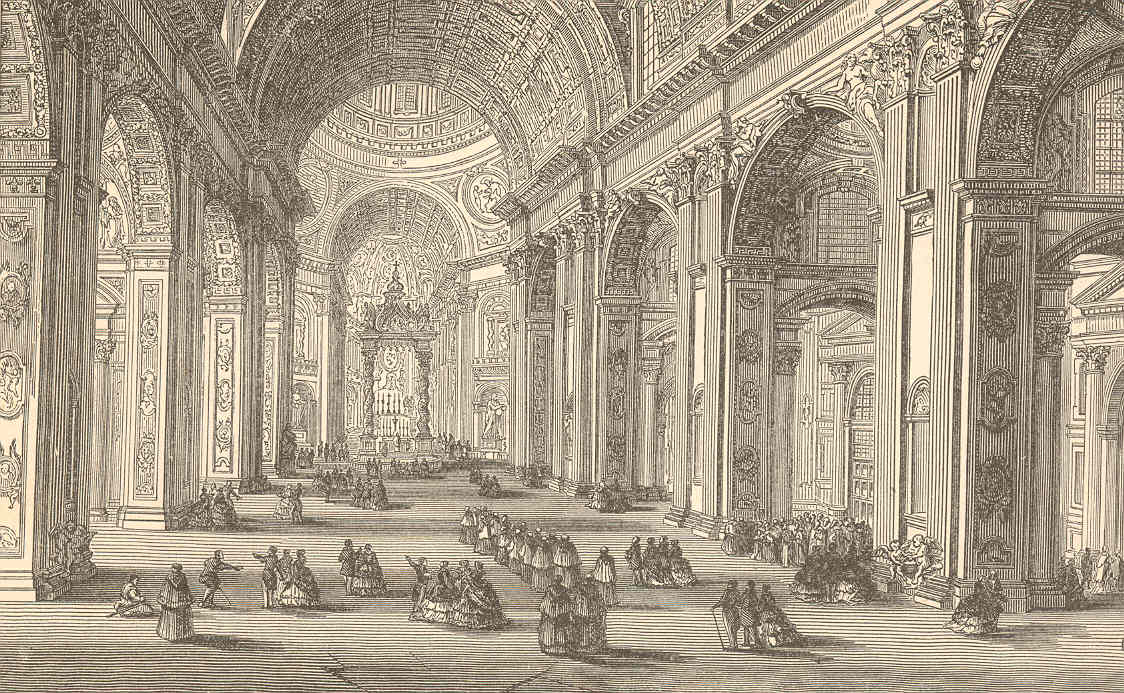
Inside of Saint Peter's around 1870

== End of the Papal States ==
After defeating the papal army on 18 September 1860 at the battle of Castelfidardo, and on 30 September at Ancona, Victor Emmanuel took all the Papal territories except Latium with Rome. In 1870 after the French troops defending Rome were recalled because of the Franco-Prussian War, Victor Emmanuel seized the city in September, making it the capital of a new united Italy after its capture on September 20.

The Black Nobility and most who held office in the Papal States lost their employment. Employees of papal institutes were dismissed. Pius IX, surrounded by loaded guns, declared the law of guarantees a hypocrisy and inequity and refused to accept Italian monthly stipends. I need money, it is true. My children throughout the world will meet my wants.

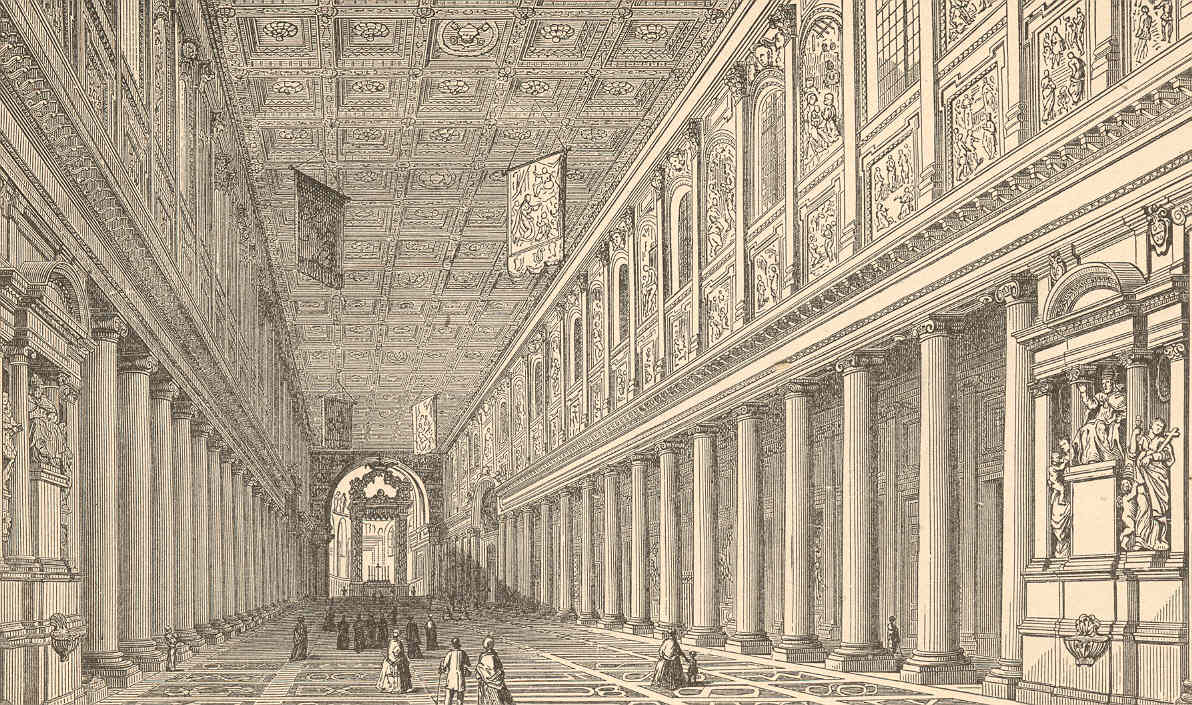
Basilica Maria Maggiore around 1870

== Roman Question ==
The pontificate of Pius IX from his return to Rome in April 1850 to 20 September 1870 is described by Raffaele De Cesare as follows:

The Roman Question was the stone tied to Napoleon's feet--that dragged him into the abyss. He never forgot, even in August 1870, a month before Sedan, that he was a sovereign of a Catholic country, that he had been made Emperor, and was supported by the votes of the Conservatives and the influence of the clergy; and that it was his supreme duty not to abandon the Pontiff. [...] For twenty years Napoleon III had been the true sovereign of Rome, where he had many friends and relations [...] Without him the temporal power would never have been reconstituted, nor, being reconstituted, would have endured.

The Pope's reception of Gustavo Ponza di San Martino, the envoy of the king Victor Emmanuel II (10 September 1870), was unfriendly. Pius IX allowed violent outbursts to escape him. Throwing the King's letter upon the table he exclaimed, "Fine loyalty! You are all a set of vipers, of whited sepulchres, and wanting in faith." He was perhaps alluding to other letters received from the King. After, growing calmer, he exclaimed: "I am no prophet, nor son of a prophet, but I tell you, you will never enter Rome!" San Martino was so mortified that he left the next day.

== Effects of the Law of Guarantees ==
He granted Pius IX the Law of Guarantees (13 May 1871) which gave the Pope the use of the Vatican but denied him sovereignty over this territory, nevertheless granting him the right to send and receive ambassadors and 3.25 million liras a year. Pius IX officially rejected this offer, retaining his claim to all the conquered territory. Although he was not forbidden or prevented from travelling as he wished, he called himself a prisoner in the Vatican. See also September Convention. With the end of the Papal States in 1870, Pope Pius IX was thus the last Pope to hold temporal powers.

The Law of Guarantees seemed, at least on paper, a reasonable solution after the take-over in Rome. However, to the Pope it was a public relations farce. Catholic convents, churches and hospitals were seized for barracks, government offices and stables. While the person of the sovereign Pontiff was solemnly declared sacred and inviolable, the residence of Pius IX was surrounded by armed soldiers, who would not permit the Pope to show himself in public. Article Two provided that anybody attacking the image of the Pope would be punished, but, as the Vatican pointed out, numerous groups and mobs denouncing the pope, and burning his effigy, were not punished in any way.

== Plans to leave Rome ==
Several times during his pontificate, Pius IX considered leaving Rome. One occurrence was in 1862, when Giuseppe Garibaldi was in Sicily gathering volunteers for a campaign to take Rome under the slogan Roma o Morte (Rome or Death). On 26 July 1862, before Garibaldi and his volunteers were stopped at Aspromonte:

Pius IX confided his fears to Lord Odo Russell, the British Minister in Rome, and asked whether he would be granted political asylum in England after the Italian troops had marched in. Odo Russell assured him that he would be granted asylum if the need arose, but said that he was sure that the Pope's fears were unfounded.

Two other instances occurred after the Capture of Rome and the suspension of the First Vatican Council. These were confided by Otto von Bismarck to Moritz Busch:

As a matter of fact, he [Pius IX] has already asked whether we could grant him asylum. I have no objection to it--Cologne or Fulda. It would be passing strange, but after all not so inexplicable, and it would be very useful to us to be recognised by Catholics as what we really are, that is to say, the sole power now existing that is capable of protecting the head of their Church. [...] But the King [William I] will not consent. He is terribly afraid. He thinks all Prussia would be perverted and he himself would be obliged to become a Catholic. I told him, however, that if the Pope begged for asylum he could not refuse it. He would have to grant it as ruler of ten million Catholic subjects who would desire to see the head of their Church protected.

Rumours have already been circulated on various occasions to the effect that the Pope intends to leave Rome. According to the latest of these the Council, which was adjourned in the summer, will be reopened at another place, some persons mentioning Malta and others Trient. [... ] Doubtless the main object of this gathering will be to elicit from the assembled fathers a strong declaration in favour of the necessity of the Temporal Power. Obviously a secondary object of this Parliament of Bishops, convoked away from Rome, would be to demonstrate to Europe that the Vatican does not enjoy the necessary liberty, although the Act of Guarantee proves that the Italian Government, in its desire for reconciliation and its readiness to meet the wishes of the Curia, has actually done everything that lies in its power.

== Sources ==
- Duffy, Eamon (1997). Saints and Sinners: A History of the Popes. New Haven, Connecticut: Yale University Press.
- Schmidlin, Josef. Papstgeschichte. Munich: Köstel-Pusztet.(1934).
- Shea, John Gilmary (1877). The Life of Pope Pius IX. New York: n.p.
