= Black nobility =

Roman aristocratic families who sided with the Papacy under Pope Pius IX

Coat of arms of the Colonna family and the Orsini family, respectively. Both are black nobility papal families.

The black nobility or black aristocracy (Italian: nobiltà nera, aristocrazia nera) are Roman aristocratic families who sided with the Papacy under Pope Pius IX after the army of the Kingdom of Italy led by the House of Savoy entered Rome on 20 September 1870, overthrew the pope and the Papal States, and took over the Quirinal Palace. The black nobility also included anyone ennobled by the pope between 1870 and the 1929 Lateran Treaty.

For the 59 years between 1870 and 1929, the pope confined himself to Vatican City and claimed to be a prisoner in the Vatican to avoid the appearance of accepting the authority of the new Italian government and state. Aristocrats who had been ennobled by the pope and were formerly subjects of the Papal States, including the senior members of the papal court, kept the front doors of their palaces in Rome closed to mourn the pope's confinement, which led to their being called the "black nobility".

== History ==
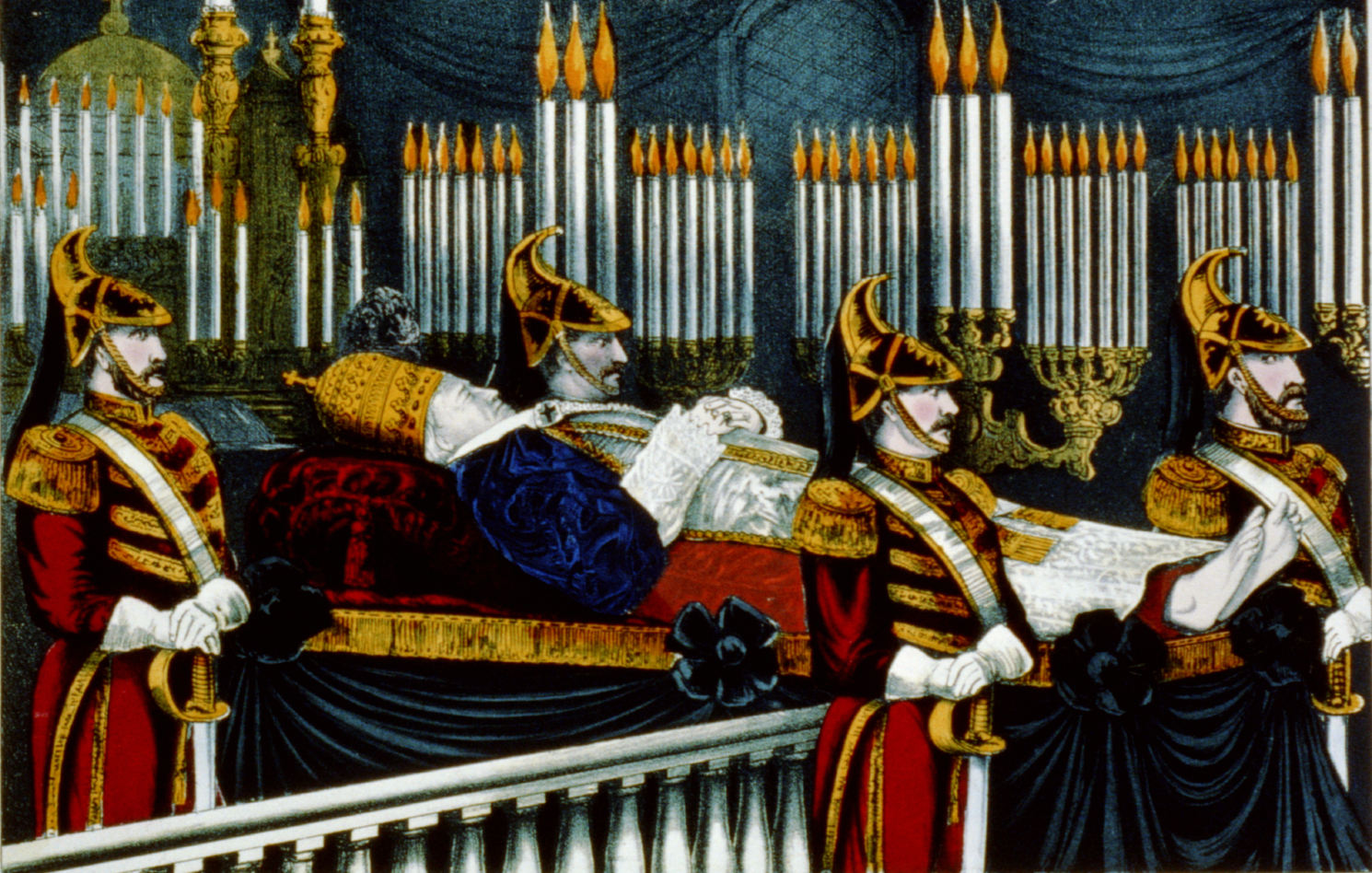
Pius IX funeral escorted by the noble guard

Despite the relatively recent name, the Black Nobility had existed for centuries, originating in the baronial class of Rome and in the powerful families who moved to Rome to benefit from a family connection to the Vatican. These supported the Popes in the governance of the Papal States and in the administration of the Holy See. Many of the members of Black Noble families also became high-ranking clergy and even Popes.

Black Nobility families, in this instance families whose ancestors included Popes, still in existence include notably the Colonna, Massimo, Orsini, Ruspoli, Pallavicini, Theodoli, Sacchetti, Borghese, Odescalchi, and Boncompagni-Ludovisi. Major extinct papal families include the Savelli, Caetani, the Aldobrandini and Conti.

Famous members of Black Nobility families include Arnaldo De Rosette, Bishop of Asti, who promulgated a Synod which provided some decrees to regulate and classify the clergy of Lombardy and Piedmont and its composition, with a particular emphasis on the Knights Hospitallers; Eugenio Pacelli, who later became Pope Pius XII; Ernesto Pacelli, an important financier; and Prospero Colonna, mayor of Rome.

Following the conclusion of the Lateran Treaty in 1929, the Black Nobility were given dual citizenship in Italy and Vatican City. Under the provisions of the treaty, noble titles granted by the pope were recognized in the Kingdom of Italy. Many of these families were members of the largely ceremonial Papal Noble Guard; others were foreigners affiliated with the Holy See in various ways. In 1931, Pope Pius XI denied the request of Alfonso XIII of Spain to open the Noble Guard further to nobles from all Catholic countries. In World War II, the Papal Noble Guard protected the Pope alongside the Swiss Guard.

In 1968, Pope Paul VI abolished many Vatican City positions with the motu proprio document Pontificalis Domus (English: The Papal Household). As well as changing the name of the group from Papal Court to Papal Household, many of the positions occupied by the Black Nobility were abolished. According to the motu proprio: "Many of the offices entrusted to members of the Papal Household were deprived of their function, continuing to exist as purely honorary positions, without much correspondence to concrete needs of the times."

Many of these positions and the Papal Court itself were still set up for administering the Papal States, which had been lost in 1870. The Black Nobility's perks, such as Vatican City licence plates, were also withdrawn. Some Black Nobles resented these changes. Roger Peyrefitte, a diplomat and author, attributed the allegation of the Pope's association with an actor to members of the Black Nobility. His subsequent public statements led to a scandal. In May 1977, some members of the Black Nobility, led by Princess Elvina Pallavicini, started courting traditionalist Archbishop Marcel Lefebvre.

== See also ==
- Papal nobility
- Papal household
- Prince assistant to the papal throne
- Pontificalis Domus
- Roman Question
- Law of Guarantees
- Prisoner in the Vatican
- Ernesto Pacelli
- Orsini family
- Colonna family

== Bibliography ==
- Alvarez, David. The Pope's Soldiers: A Military History of the Modern Vatican (Lawrence, KS: University Press of Kansas, 2011)
- Coulombe, Charles A. (2003). Vicars of Christ: A History of the Popes. New York: Citadel Press. ISBN 0-8065-2370-0. p. 415
- Arlington, Paul I. Murphy with R. René (1983). La popessa (1. print. ed.). New York: Warner. ISBN 0-446-51258-3. p. 41
- Article on the pre-1968 reform Papal Court, including hereditary officers
- Text of the apostolic letter Pontificalis Domus (in Latin)

Calendario Pontificio (tutte le edizioni) Gallelli-editore Libro d'Oro della Nobiltà Pontificia (tutte le edizioni) Gallelli-editore
