= Papal jurisdiction =

Papal jurisdiction may refer to:

- Papal supremacy, the ecclesiastical jurisdiction of the pope
- Temporal power of the Holy See, the political jurisdiction of the pope
