= Temporal power =

Temporal power is a term of art in medieval and early modern political philosophy to refer to sovereign and secular power, as contrasted with spiritual power.

- The temporal power (simply), the state (polity) or secular authority, in contrast to the church or spiritual authority
- Temporal power (papal), the worldly power exercised by the Roman Pontiff
