= Advocates of Saint Peter =

Catholic organization dedicated to defending the church in civil courts (1878–1909)

The Advocates of Saint Peter (Italian: Avvocati di San Pietro, French: Avocats de Saint-Pierre) were a body of jurists, whose stated main object was the defense of the Holy See in its rights and privileges, both in the spiritual and temporal realm. It was established in 1878 and suppressed in 1909.

== History ==
They constituted a society whose statutes were confirmed approbatio in a brief issued by Pope Leo XIII on 5 July 1878.

It bound its members to refute false statements of enemies of the Church, whether derived from distortions of history, jurisprudence, or dogma, but above all were they to devote their legal knowledge to a defense of the Church's rights before civil tribunals. The society was formed in 1877, on the occasion of the Golden Episcopal Jubilee of Pope Pius IX, and the Advocate Count Cajetan Agnelli dei Malherbi, of Rome, became its first president. The ordinary members were jurists, but the society also enrolled as honorary members distinguished ecclesiastics or laymen who have made it a practice to defend Church interests along the lines of this organization.

Pope Pius IX warmly approved of the undertaking and desired a wide extension of the society.

The society spread rapidly over the Catholic world, and branches of the society were found in many countries. Colleges of the Advocates of Saint Peter, numbering many hundred members, existed in Italy, England, Austria, France, Spain, Germany, Canada and South America. All of their bodies were affiliated to the directory in Rome.

The body was transformed into a chivalric order, with France as its center. Then abuses crept in. Pope Pius X ordered an inquiry, which resulted in the Pope's decision to suppress the association in August 1909, stating that it no longer responded to the needs of the times.
