= Law of Guarantees =

1871 law regarding Holy See prerogatives

The Law of Guarantees (Italian: Legge delle guarentigie), sometimes also called the Law of Papal Guarantees, was the name given to the law passed by the senate and chamber of the Parliament of the Kingdom of Italy, 13 May 1871, concerning the prerogatives of the Holy See, and the relations between state and church in the Kingdom of Italy. It guaranteed sovereign prerogatives to the pope, who had been deprived of the territory of the Papal States. The popes refused to accept the law, as it was enacted by a foreign government and could therefore be revoked at will, leaving the popes without a full claim to sovereign status. In response, the popes declared themselves prisoners of the Vatican. The ensuing Roman Question was not resolved until the Lateran Pacts of 1929.

== Origins of the law ==
After the 1870 Capture of Rome, tensions in Italy between church and state ran high. The Italian government maintained that it had invaded Rome in order to safeguard the person of the pope (Note: Visconti-Venosta, circular of 7 September 1870; the autograph letter of Victor Emmanuel to Pius IX, dated 29 Aug., received 10 Sept.; again the king's answer to the Roman deputation which brought him the result of the plebiscite) and the independence of the Holy See. (Note: General Cadorna's proclamation at Terni, 11 Sept.)

A circular of the minister Emilio Visconti Venosta, addressed to all major Catholic powers, hinted at ensuring these intentions by means of an international congress. The international reaction was, however, generally one of disinterest, and the Italian government instead chose to pass a domestic law.

In a letter from his cardinal vicar dated 2 March 1871, Pope Pius IX protested against the law, saying that "it was no easy task to decide whether absurdity, cunning, or contempt played the largest part" in its passage.

== Provisions ==
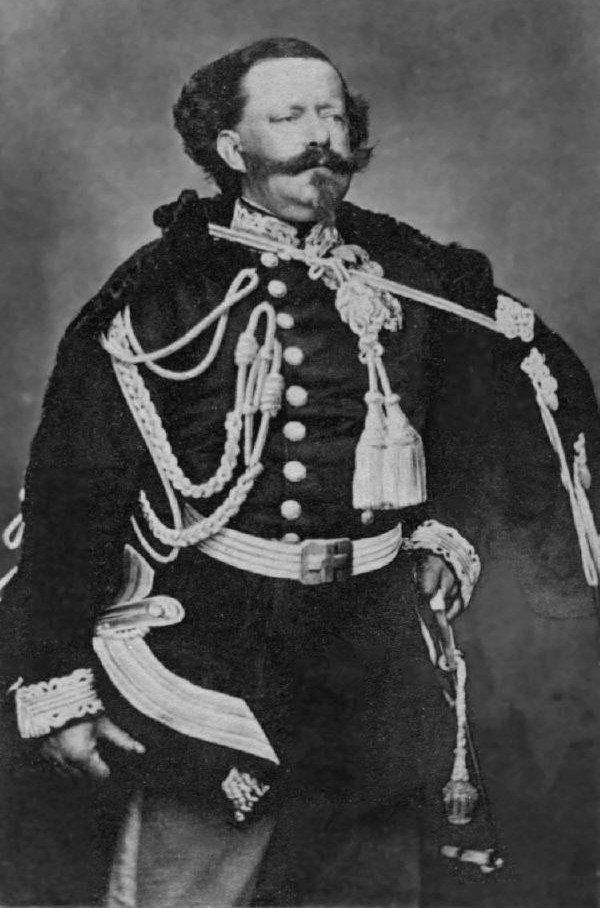
Victor Emmanuel II, the first King of the united Italy

Parliament passed in 1871 the famous Law of Papal Guarantees, which proposed to solve the question on Cavour's principle of a free church in a free state. The pope was declared an independent sovereign and, as such, was entitled to receive and to send ambassadors and to conduct diplomatic affairs without any interference from the Italian government. His territory, however, was limited to the district in Rome known as the "Leonine City", over which floated the Papal flag, and into which no Italian officer could enter without permission from the Papal authorities. The palaces, churches, museums, offices, villas, and gardens in the Leonine City were to be exempt from taxation, and the Papal government was to have free use of the Italian railway, postal, and telegraph systems. The church was guaranteed full freedom of self-government, and the old interference by the state in church affairs was declared terminated.

The principal stipulations of the law may be summed up as follows:

- the pope's person to be sacred and inviolable;
- insult or injury to the pope to be treated on a par with insult or injury to the king's person; discussion of religious matters to be absolutely free;
- royal honours to be paid to the pope; that he have the right to the customary guards;
- as an indemnity for the loss of his domains, as an annual sum in perpetuity, the pope was voted 3,225,000 lire (Note: In 1913, roughly US$622,425 or GB£127,933 (cf. Catholic Encyclopedia). In 1921, roughly US$645,000 (cf. Schapiro, Modern History, pg. 447).) to cover all the needs of the Holy See (College of Cardinals, Roman congregations, embassies, etc.) and the maintenance of church buildings;
- the Lateran and Vatican palaces, as well as the Villa of Castel Gandolfo, to remain the property of the pope; these articles assure the pope and all engaged in the spiritual government of the Church, as well as the college of cardinals assembled in conclave, complete liberty of communication with the Catholic world, exempt them from all interference with their letters, papers, etc.;
- the clergy to have freedom of assembly;
- the government to renounce the "Apostolic Legation" in Sicily, and the right of nomination to major benefices, with reservation, however, of the royal patronage; the bishops are not obliged to take the oath (of allegiance) on appointment;
- the Exequatur to be maintained only for the major benefices (except in Rome, and in the suburbicarian sees) and for acts affecting the disposition of ecclesiastical property;
- in spiritual matters no appeal to be allowed against ecclesiastical authority; the civil courts, however, to be competent to pass judgment on the juridical effects of ecclesiastical sentences. Provision to be made, by a future law, for the reorganization, conservation, and administration of all the church property in the kingdom.
- the right to active and passive legation, and immunity of envoys accredited to the Holy See within Italian territory.

== Papal response ==
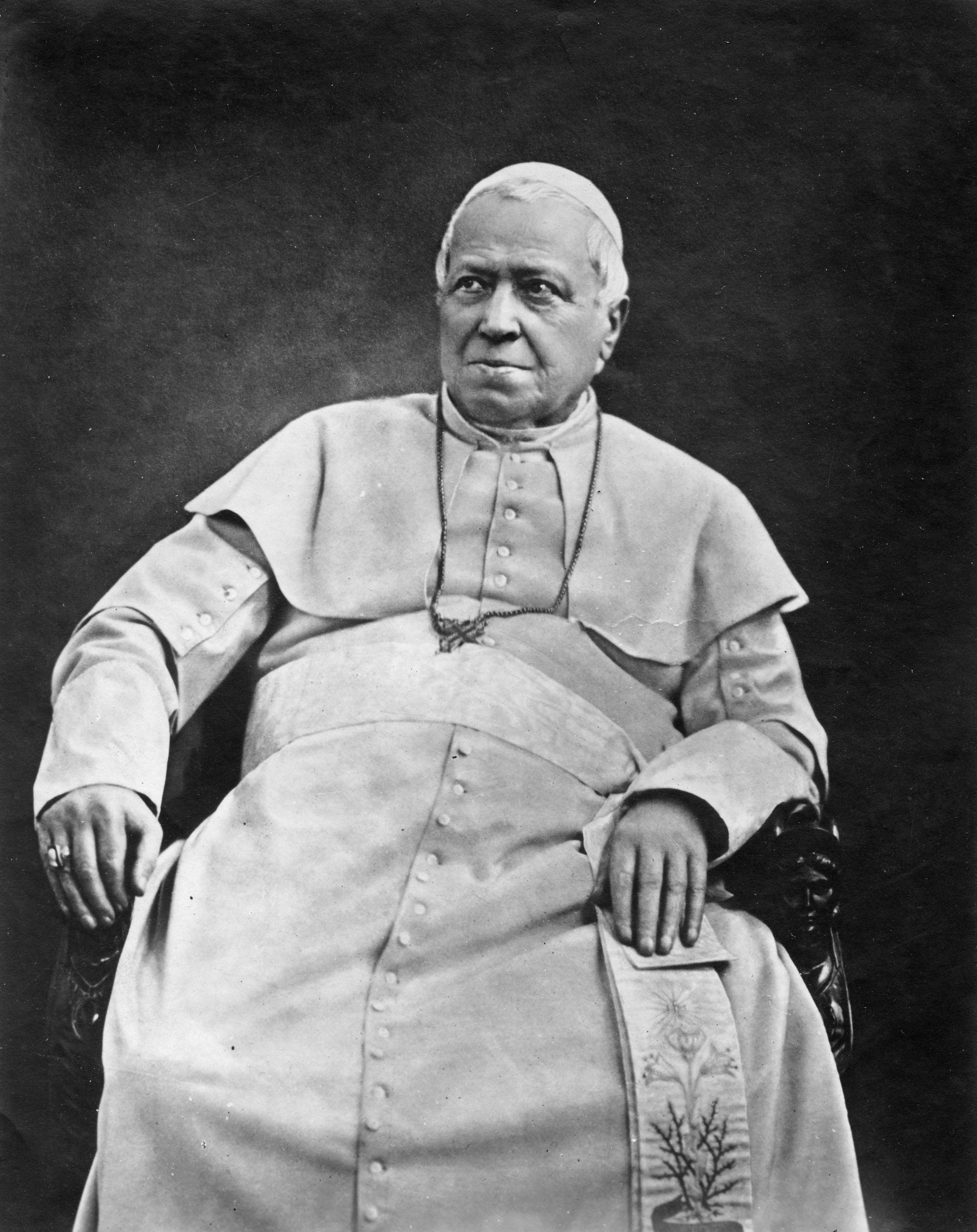
Pope Pius IX

The popes refused to recognize the fait accompli which was supported by the Law of Guarantees, and refused in principle to recognize in the Italian government any right to grant them prerogatives, or to make laws for them, a position that lasted until the resolution of the Roman Question in 1929.

Pius IX indignantly refused to accept the terms of the "sub-Alpine" Government, as he termed the House of Savoy, whom he regarded as the despoiler of "God's vicar." Parliament regularly voted the annuity from 1871 onward, but the popes never accepted it, as to do so would be to recognize the Kingdom of Italy as a legitimate government, which no pope from 1871 to 1929 was willing to do. Pius IX shut himself in his tiny domain and refused to leave it under any circumstances, regarding himself as the "Prisoner of the Vatican"; his successors to 1929 followed the policy and never set foot outside the Vatican once they were elected pope.

Indeed, each of the "concessions" carried with it a special servitude, while later events proved that they were not intended to be seriously observed. In the Encyclical of 15 May following, the pope declared that no guarantees could secure him the liberty and independence necessary in the exercise of his power and authority. He renewed this protest at the consistory of 27 October, arguing that a law voted by two houses of Parliament could with equal ease be abrogated by them at will. Indeed, part of the programme of the "Left" party in the Italian Parliament in this era was to suppress the Law of Guarantees. Pius IX, moreover, was unwilling to accept formally the arrangements made concerning the relations of Church and State, especially the Exequatur and the administration of ecclesiastical property. Moreover, if, as he hoped, the occupation of Rome was to be only temporary, the acceptance of this law seemed useless. Doubtless, too, such acceptance on his part would have been interpreted as at least a tacit recognition of accomplished facts, as a renunciation of the temporal power, and the property which had been taken from the Holy See (e.g., the Quirinal Palace). The abandonment of the "Apostolic Legation" in Sicily, for eight centuries an apple of discord between the Holy See and the Kingdom of Sicily, and the endowment granted the pope, were truly but slight compensation for all that had been taken from him. Consequently, neither Pius IX nor his successors ever touched the aforesaid annual endowment, preferring to depend on the offerings of the faithful throughout the Catholic world. It may be added that the endowment was not sufficient to meet the needs of the Church, nor with their multiplication could it be increased.

=== Non expedit ===
Non expedit (Latin: "It is not expedient") were the words with which the Holy See enjoined upon Italian Catholics the policy of abstention from the polls in parliamentary elections. The encyclical also forbade Italian Catholics from holding office under the Crown of Italy. This policy was adopted after a period of uncertainty and of controversy which followed the Proclamation of the Kingdom of Italy (1861), and which was intensified by laws hostile to the Church and, especially, to the religious orders (1865–66). To this uncertainty the Holy Penitentiary put an end by its decree of 29 February 1868, in which, in the above words, it sanctioned the motto; "Neither elector nor elected". Until then there had been in the Italian Parliament a few eminent representatives of Catholic interests—Vito d'Ondes Reggio, Augusto Conti, Cesare Cantù, and others. The principal motive of this decree was that the oath taken by deputies might be interpreted as an approval of the spoliation of the Holy See, as Pius IX declared in an audience of 11 October 1874. A practical reason for it, also, was that, in view of the electoral law of that day, by which the electorate was reduced to 650,000, and as the Government manipulated the elections to suit its own purposes, it would have been hopeless to attempt to prevent the passage of anti-Catholic laws. On the other hand, the masses seemed unprepared for parliamentary government, and as, in the greater portion of Italy (Parma, Modena, Tuscany, the Pontifical States, and the Kingdom of the Two Sicilies), nearly all sincere Catholics were partisans of the dispossessed princes, they were liable to be denounced as enemies of Italy; they would also have been at variance with the Catholics of Piedmont and of the provinces wrested from Austria, and this division would have further weakened the Catholic Parliamentary group.

As might be expected, this measure did not meet with universal approval; the so-called Moderates accused the Catholics of failing in their duty to society and to their country. In 1882, the suffrage having been extended, Pope Leo XIII took into serious consideration the partial abolition of the restrictions established by the Non Expedit, but nothing was actually done (cf. "Archiv für kathol. Kirchenrecht", 1904, p. 396). On the contrary, as many people came to the conclusion that the decree Non Expedit was not intended to be absolute, but was only an admonition made to apply upon one particular occasion, the Holy Office declared (30 Dec., 1886) that the rule in question implied a grave precept, and emphasis was given to this fact on several subsequent occasions (Letter of Leo XIII to the Cardinal Secretary of State, 14 May 1895; Congregation of Extraordinary Affairs, 27 January 1902; Pius X, Motu proprio, 18 Dec., 1903). Later Pope Pius X, by his encyclical "Il fermo proposito" (11 June 1905) modified the Non Expedit, declaring that, when there was question of preventing the election of a "subversive" candidate, the bishops could ask for a suspension of the rule, and invite the Catholics to hold themselves in readiness to go to the polls.

== Legal status of the Holy See under the Law of Guarantees ==
There was occasional controversy between writers on international law and on Italian ecclesiastical legislation over various matters connected with this law: whether in the eyes of the Italian government the pope is a sovereign, whether he enjoys the privilege of extraterritoriality (not expressly recognized to him, though granted to foreign embassies to the Holy See), etc. As far as the Holy See was concerned, these controversies had no meaning; it had never ceased to assert its sovereign status and corresponding rights.

Some writers saw the Law of Guarantees as constitutive of the legal personality of the Holy See after 1870, conferring a legal personality subject to unilateral abrogation by the Kingdom of Italy. Other writers viewed the Law of Guarantees as a declarative instrument of the extant sovereignty of the Holy See.

=== Civil effects in Italian law ===
The question arose as to whether this untouched endowment would be confiscated by the Italian treasury at the end of every five years, as is usual with other public debts of the Kingdom of Italy. The Civiltà Cattolica maintained that it could not be confiscated, but the Italian courts decided differently. They reasoned that since Pius IX had not accepted the endowment, he had never come into possession of it, and therefore the funds were not actually being confiscated but still belonged to the Italian State. Pius IX expressly rejected this income on 13 November 1872.

== Resolution of the Roman Question ==
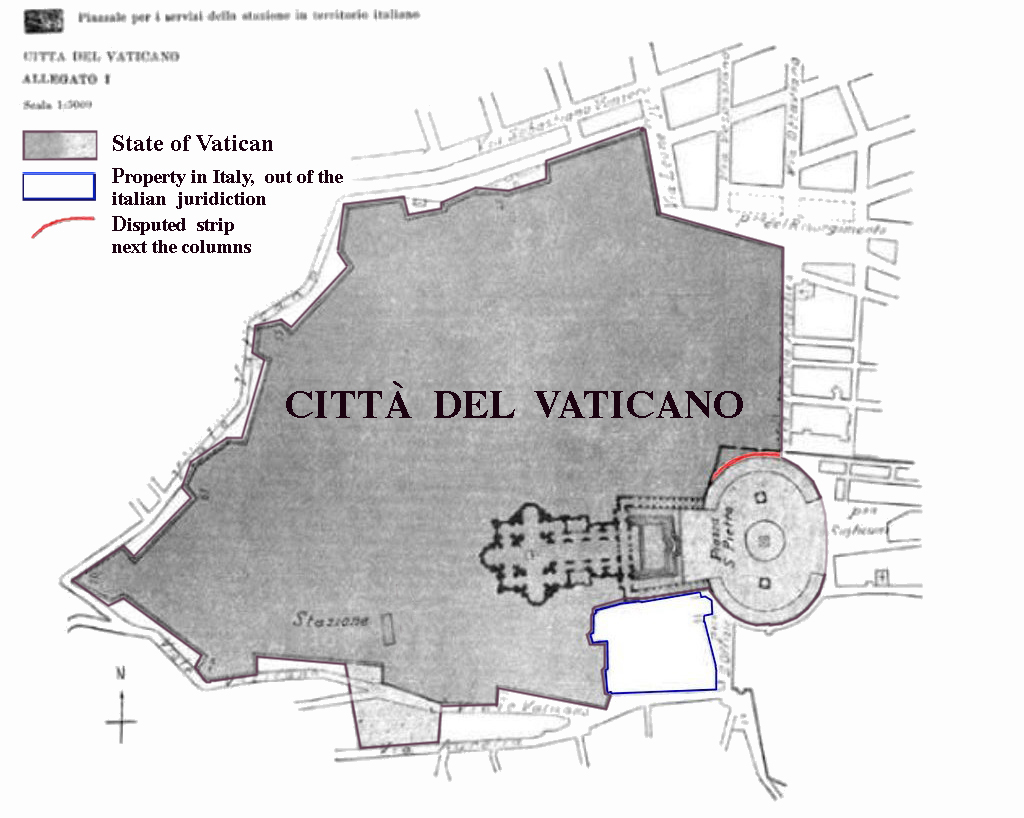
Territory of Vatican City State, established by the Lateran Accords

After the papal rejection of the Law of Guarantees, the popes existed in a self-imposed state as "Prisoner of the Vatican" in diplomatic protestation of the Kingdom of Italy's claims to the Papal States. The popes refused to leave the Vatican. At first the situation appeared embarrassing or even dangerous to Italians, who feared that France or Austria might champion the cause of the Pope and compel Italy to evacuate Rome. But the defeat of these two Catholic nations by Prussia and, especially, the establishment of an anticlerical Republic in France, made such an event only a remote possibility, and the "Prisoner of the Vatican" became a polite fiction. As time went on there began a rapprochement between the Vatican and the Quirinal, (Note: The Vatican is the palace of the pope, and the Quirinal was the palace of the king (originally the summer residence of the pope), but they are used figuratively to mean the Papacy and Italian government respectively (cf. Schapiro, Modern History, p. 447 footnote 1 & p. 448 footnote 1).) though, in theory, the successors of Pius IX continued to advocate the restoration of their temporal power. The situation was finally resolved in 1929 by the Lateran Pacts which created the State of Vatican City as an independent sovereign state to guarantee the political and legal independence of the pope from the Italian government. There is a treaty as well as a concordat, which together form a juridical whole.

== Legacy ==
Although in principle the popes refused to accept the Law of Guarantees, in practice they tacitly accepted some of its provisions. They allowed clergy to accept revenues from the Italian state deriving from their benefices. The popes began appointing all Italian bishops. Previously, various Italian civil authorities had had the right of presentation, but the Law of Guarantees had given the right of free conferral back to the pope. Since the Italian territories had more bishoprics than in any other part of Christendom, by 1870 Victor Emmanuel had the right to present 237 bishops for appointment, more than any other king in Christian history. Such immense powers of appointment would now be exercised by the popes directly, which changed the relationship between the papacy and the Italian episcopate and shifted views on who should appoint bishops in general. A new and growing assumption was that it was for the pope to directly appoint bishops. The loss of temporal power greatly enhanced papal control over the church in Italy.

== See also ==
- Concordat
- Foreign relations of the Holy See
- Lateran Treaty
- Legal status of the Holy See
- Risorgimento
- Roman Question
