= Raffaele Cadorna =

Italian army officer (1815-1897)

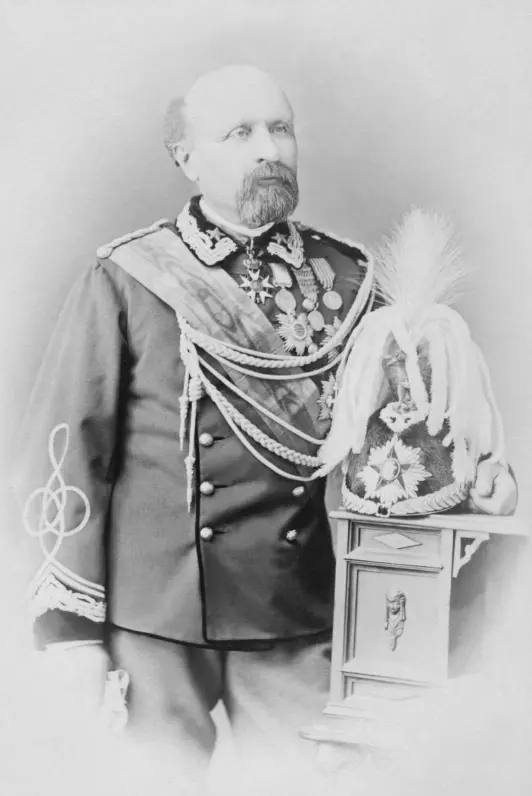
General Raffaele Cadorna

Raffaele Cadorna (9 February 1815 – 6 February 1897) was an Italian general who served as one of the major Piedmontese leaders responsible for the unification of Italy during the mid-19th century.

Born in Milan, Cadorna entered the Piedmontese military academy at Turin in 1832. Joining the engineer corps in 1840, he commanded a volunteer engineer battalion in Lombardy from March 1848 until August 1849 during the First Italian War of Independence.

Cadorna served with the Piedmontese forces in January 1855 during the Crimean War. He won distinction during the Second War of Independence at the Battle of San Martino and was awarded the rank of Colonel in 1859. He was also appointed Minister of War to the republican regime of Tuscany that same year.

Cadorna served as a lieutenant general and corps commander in the Italian front of the Austro-Prussian War. He led successful operations against the Austrians from June to July 1866.

In 1870, he led the invasion of the Papal States. Cadorna's capture of Rome on 20 September finally completed the unification of Italy. For this service, he was named a Senator the following year. Retiring from public life soon after, he lived in Tuscany until his death in 1897.

His son Luigi Cadorna rose to the rank of Field Marshal and served as Italian chief of staff during part of World War I, while his grandson Raffaele Cadorna Jr. was a general and commander of the Italian resistance during World War II.
