= Gustavo Ponza di San Martino =

Italian politician

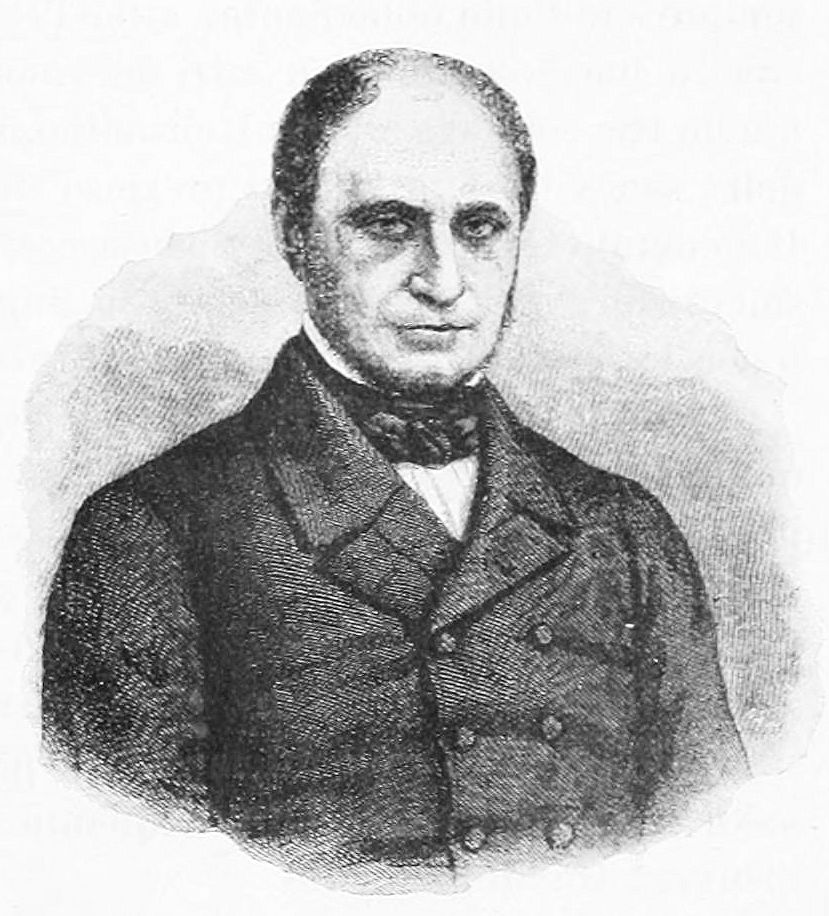
Gustavo Ponza di San Martino

Gustavo Ponza, conte di San Martino (1 June 1810 – 6 September 1876) was an Italian politician, who was administrator and senator of the Kingdom of Italy.

He was born in Cuneo, the son of conte Cesare. He was appointed Intendente generale of Genoa, (4 August 1848) and made a councillor of state of Victor Emmanuel II of Italy, 27 February 1852. President of the provincial council of Cuneo, his birthplace, he served as communal councillor for Turin in 1857-64 and 1866-76. As the king's lieutenant governor at Naples, it was his duty to wait upon Pope Pius IX with suggestions for papal role in the Capture of Rome, which Pius adamantly refused.

He died at Dronero, near Cuneo, in 1876.

His son, Coriolano Ponza di San Martino (1842–1926), briefly served as Italian Minister of War in April 1900 – April 1902.

== See also ==
- Unification of Italy
- Ministers of the Interior of the Kingdom of Sardinia
