= Julius Hermann Moritz Busch =

German publicist (1821–1899)

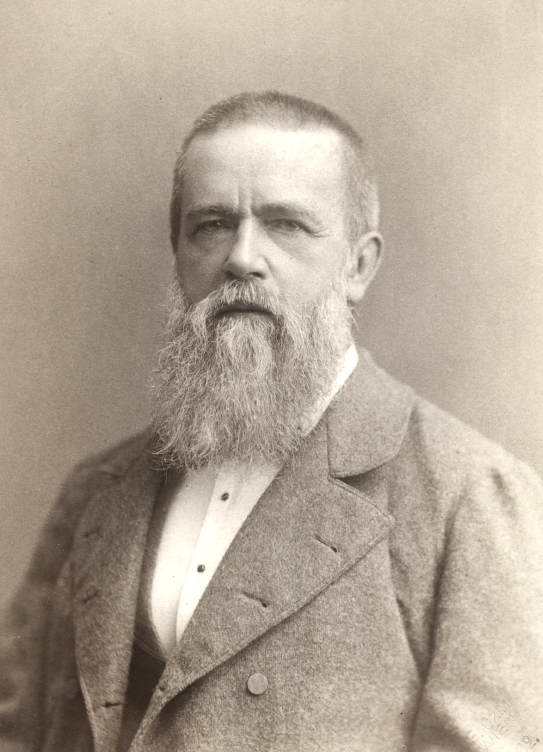
image of Julius Hermann Moritz Busch

Julius Hermann Moritz Busch (13 February 1821 – 16 November 1899) was a German publicist. He has been characterized as "Bismarck's Boswell."

== Biography ==
Busch was born at Dresden. He entered the University of Leipzig in 1841 as a student of philosophy and theology, and graduated as doctor philosophiae. From 1847, he devoted himself entirely to journalism and literature. He began literary life as a translator of Dickens, Thackeray, and other English authors.

In 1851 he went to America, but soon returned disillusioned to Germany, and published an account of his travels. During the next years he travelled extensively in the East and wrote books on Egypt, Greece and Palestine. From 1856 he was employed at Leipzig on the Grenzboten, one of the most influential German periodicals, which, under the editorship of Gustav Freytag, had become the organ of the National Liberal Party. In this role, Busch strongly supported Bismarck's policies.

In 1864 he became closely connected with the Augustenburg party in Schleswig-Holstein, but after 1866 he transferred his services to the Prussian government, and was employed in a semi-official capacity in the newly conquered province of Hanover. His work on the Grenzboten had attracted Bismarck's attention, and in 1870 he received an appointment to the German Foreign Office, where he functioned as one of Bismarck's press agents. From that time and for many years, he was the inseparable companion and confidant of the chancellor, taking daily notes of his sayings and doings, and earning for himself the title of "Bismarck's Boswell." He was at the chancellor's side during the whole of the campaign of 1870–71. He was dismissed from his post in 1871, but remained on friendly terms with Bismarck: "through him Bismarck used the Press to mould public opinion".

Busch died at Leipzig on 16 November 1899.

== Works ==
After his trip to the United States, he published:

- Wanderungen zwischen Hudson und Mississippi (1853)
- Die Mormonen (1857), a book critical of Mormonism

In 1878 he published the first of his works on Bismarck, a book entitled Bismarck und seine Leute, während des Krieges mit Frankreich (Bismarck and his People during the War with France"), in which, under the form of extracts from his diary, he gave an account of the chancellor's life during the war. The vividness of the descriptions and the cleverness with which the conversations were reported ensured a success, and the work was translated into several languages, and was reviewed by Henry James in The Nation. This was followed in 1884 by another book, Unser Reichskanzler (translated into English as "Our Chancellor"), chiefly dealing with the work in the foreign office in Berlin.

Immediately after Bismarck's death, Busch published the chancellor's famous petition to the emperor Wilhelm II of Germany dated 18 March 1890, requesting to be relieved of office. This was followed by a pamphlet Bismarck und sein Werk; and in 1898 in London and in English, by the famous memoirs entitled Bismarck: some Secret Pages of his History (German by Grunow, under title Tagebuchblätter), in which were reprinted the whole of the earlier works, but which contains in addition a considerable amount of new material, passages from the earlier works which had been omitted because of the attacks they contained on people in high position, records of later conversations, and some important letters and documents which had been entrusted to him by Bismarck. Many passages were of such a nature that it could not be safely published in Germany; but in 1899 a far better and more complete German edition was published at Leipzig in three volumes and consisting of three sections.
