= Lateran Treaty =

1929 treaty between Italy and the Holy See

Treaty between the Holy See and Italy
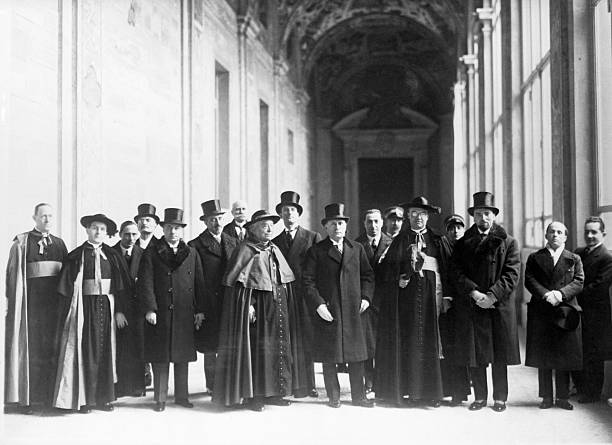
- Holy See and Italian delegations prior to signing the treaty
- Type: Bilateral treaty
- Context: Establishment of Vatican City on the Italian Peninsula
- Signed: 11 February 1929
- Location: Rome, Italy
- Effective: 7 June 1929
- Condition: Ratification by the Holy See and the Kingdom of Italy
- Signatories: (Holy See) Pietro Gasparri (Kingdom of Italy) Benito Mussolini
- Parties: Holy See; Italy
- Language: Italian

The Lateran Treaty was one component of the Lateran Pacts of 1929, agreements between Italy under King Victor Emmanuel III and Duce Benito Mussolini and the Holy See under Pope Pius XI to settle the long-standing Roman question.

The treaty recognised Vatican City as an independent state under the sovereignty of the Holy See. Italy also agreed to give the Catholic Church financial compensation for the loss of the Papal States. In 1948, the Lateran Treaty was recognized in the Constitution of Italy as regulating the relations between the Italian Republic and the Catholic Church. While the treaty was significantly revised in 1984, ending the status of Catholicism as the sole state religion of Italy, the Vatican remains a distinct sovereign entity to the present day.

The treaty and associated pacts were named after the Lateran Palace, where they were signed on 11 February 1929. The Italian Parliament ratified them on 7 June 1929.

== Content ==
The Lateran Pacts are often presented as three treaties: a 27-article treaty of conciliation, a three-article financial convention, and a 45-article concordat; however, the website of the Holy See presents the financial convention as an annex of the treaty of conciliation, considering the pacts as two documents:

- A political treaty recognising the full sovereignty of the Holy See in the State of Vatican City, which was thereby established, accompanied by four annexes:
  - A map of the territory of Vatican City State
  - Maps of buildings with extraterritorial privilege and exemption from expropriation and taxes (owned by the Holy See but located in Italy and not forming part of Vatican City)
  - Maps of buildings with exemption from expropriation and taxes (but without extraterritorial privilege)
  - A financial convention agreed on as a definitive settlement of the claims of the Holy See following the capture of Rome in 1870 of its territories and property (Note: The Italian state agreed to pay 750 million Lire immediately plus consolidated bearer bonds with a coupon rate of 5% and a nominal value of Lire 1,000 million. It thus paid less than it would have paid, Lire 3.25 million per annum, under the 1871 Law of Guarantees, which the Holy See had not accepted.)
- A concordat regulating relations between the Catholic Church and the Italian state.

== History ==
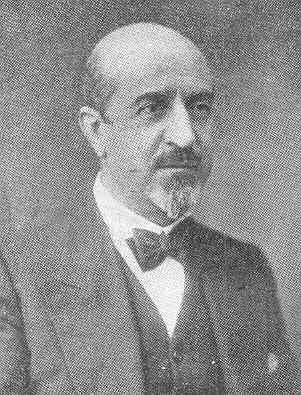
Francesco Pacelli was the right-hand man to Pius XI's Secretary of State Pietro Gasparri during the Lateran Treaty negotiations

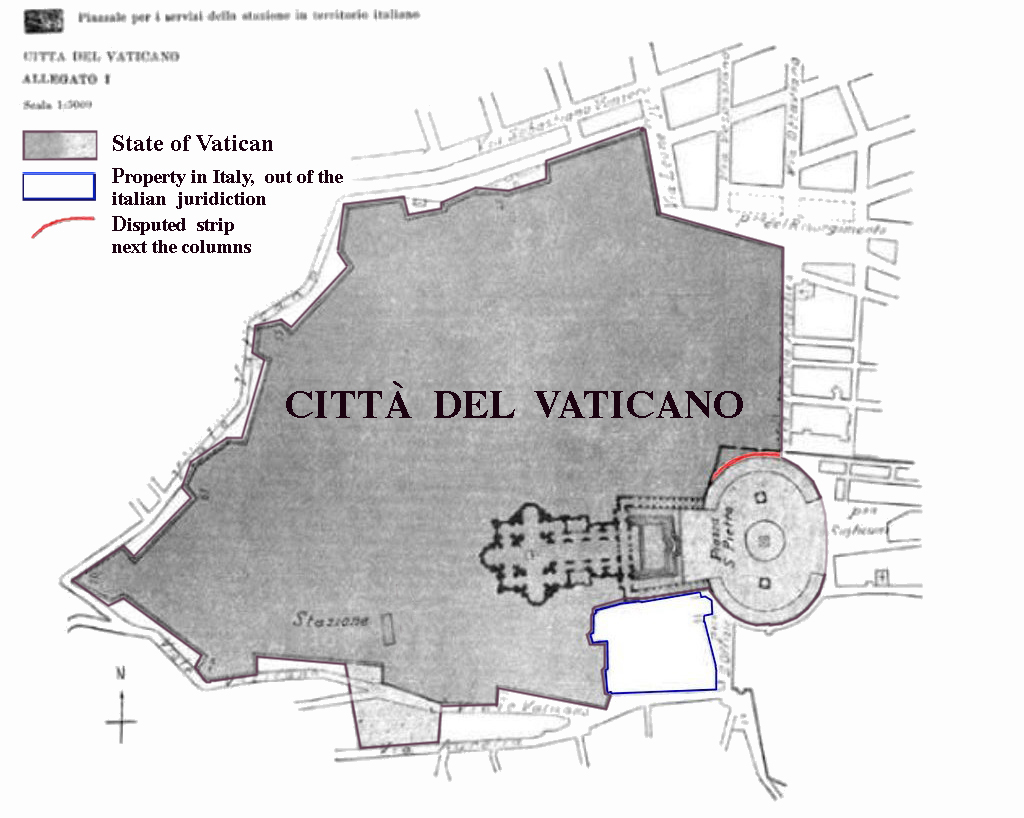
The territory of Vatican City State, established by the Lateran Accords

A map of Vatican City

During the unification of Italy in the mid-19th century, the Papal States under Pope Pius IX resisted incorporation into the new nation, even as almost all the other Italian countries joined it; Camillo Cavour's dream of proclaiming the Kingdom of Italy from the steps of St. Peter's Basilica did not come to pass. The nascent Kingdom of Italy invaded and occupied Romagna (the eastern portion of the Papal States) in 1860, leaving only Lazio (Latium) in the pope's domains.

Latium, including Rome itself, was occupied and annexed in 1870. For the following sixty years, relations between the Papacy and the Italian government were hostile, and the sovereign rights of the pope became known as the Roman question.

The Popes knew that Rome was irrevocably the capital of Italy. There was nothing they wanted less than to govern it or be burdened with a papal kingdom. What they wished was independence, a foothold on the earth that belonged to no other sovereign.

Under the terms of the Law of Guarantees of 1871, the Italian government offered to Pius IX and his successors the use of, but not sovereignty over, the Vatican and Lateran Palaces and a yearly income of 3,250,000 lire. The Holy See refused this settlement, on the grounds that the pope's spiritual jurisdiction required clear independence from any political power, and thereafter each pope considered himself a "prisoner in the Vatican". The Lateran Treaty ended this impasse.

Negotiations for the settlement of the Roman question began in 1926 between the Holy See and the Italian fascist government led by Prime Minister Benito Mussolini, and culminated in the agreements of the Lateran Pacts, signed—the Treaty says—for King Victor Emmanuel III by Mussolini and for Pope Pius XI by Cardinal Secretary of State Pietro Gasparri, on 11 February 1929. It was ratified on 7 June 1929.

The agreements included a political treaty which created the state of the Vatican City and guaranteed full and independent sovereignty to the Holy See. The Pope was pledged to perpetual neutrality in international relations and to abstention from mediation in a controversy unless specifically requested by all parties. In the first article of the treaty, Italy reaffirmed the principle established in the 1848 Constitution of the Kingdom of Italy, that "the Catholic, Apostolic and Roman Religion is the only religion of the State".

The attached financial agreement was accepted as settlement of all the claims of the Holy See against Italy from the loss of temporal power over the Papal States in 1870, though the sum agreed to was actually less than Italy had offered in 1871. To commemorate the successful conclusion of the negotiations, Mussolini commissioned the Via della Conciliazione ("Road of the Conciliation"), which would symbolically link the Vatican City to the heart of Rome.

=== After 1946 ===
The post-World War II Constitution of the Italian Republic, adopted in 1948, states that relations between the State and the Catholic Church "are regulated by the Lateran Treaties". In 1984, the concordat was significantly revised. Both sides declared: "The principle of the Catholic religion as the sole religion of the Italian State, originally referred to by the Lateran Pacts, shall be considered to be no longer in force."

The exclusive state financial support for the Church was ended, and replaced by financing through a dedicated personal income tax called the otto per mille, under which Italian taxpayers devolve a compulsory 0.8% from their annual income tax return to a religious group recognized by Italy, or a state-run social assistance program. To gain access to the tax funds, a religion must formally agree to participating in the program by signing a document called "stipulation of intese", along with the Prime Minister, which must then be ratified by Parliament. As of 2023, there were 13 religious groups with access: Confederation of Methodist and Waldensian Churches, Seventh-day Adventists, Assemblies of God, Jews, Baptists, Lutherans, the Church of Jesus Christ, Orthodox Church of the Constantinople Patriarchate, Italian Apostolic Church, Buddhist Union, Soka Gakkai Buddhists, Hindus, and the Anglican Church. However, two of the largest minority religions in Italy are excluded from this system: Jehovah's Witnesses and Islam. Although two Prime Ministers have signed "intese" agreements with the Jehovah's Witnesses, in both instances Parliament neglected to put the matter up to a vote for ratification, leading the Witnesses to take legal action against this apparent discrimination with the European Court of Human Rights. The Italian government has attempted to negotiate a "intese" with Islamic groups on at least two occasions, but the negotiations were unsuccessful, as the numerous Islamic associations in Italy could not agree upon the terms needed to a establish a unified organization that could sign an "intesa" and receive the 0.8 percent tax.

The revised concordat regulated the conditions under which the state accords legal recognition to church marriages and to ecclesiastical declarations of nullity of marriages. The agreement also ended state recognition of knighthoods and titles of nobility conferred by the Holy See, the right of the state to request ecclesiastical honours for those chosen to perform religious functions for the state or the royal household, and the right of the state to present political objections to the proposed appointment of diocesan bishops. In 2008, it was announced that the Vatican would no longer immediately adopt all Italian laws, citing conflict over right-to-life issues, partially attributed to the November, 2008 Italian court ruling in the trial and ruling of the Eluana Englaro case.

== Violations ==
The Italian racial laws of 1938 prohibited marriages between Jews and non-Jews, including Catholics: the Vatican viewed this as a violation of the Concordat, which gave the church the sole right to regulate marriages involving Catholics. Article 34 of the Concordat specified that marriages performed by the Catholic Church would always be considered valid by civil authorities. The Holy See understood this to apply to all marriages in Italy celebrated by Roman Catholic clergy, regardless of the faiths of those being married.

== See also ==
- Lateran Treaty Day
- List of sovereigns of the Vatican City State
- Index of Vatican City-related articles
- Properties of the Holy See
- Public funding of the Catholic Church in Italy
- Reichskonkordat, treaty between the Holy See and Nazi Germany
- Religion in Italy

== Sources ==
- Kertzer, David I. (2004). Prisoner of the Vatican: The Popes' Secret Plot to Capture Rome from the New Italian State. Boston: Houghton Mifflin. ISBN 978-0-618-22442-5.
- —— (2014). The Pope and Mussolini: The Secret History of Pius XI and the Rise of Fascism in Europe. Oxford: Oxford University Press. ISBN 978-0-19-871616-7.
- Latourette, Kenneth Scott (1958). Christianity in a Revolutionary Age: A History of Christianity in the 19th and 20th Century. Vol. 4: The 20th Century in Europe. New York: Harper. pp. 32–35, 153, 156, 371.
- McCormick, Anne O'Hare (1957). Vatican Journal: 1921–1954. New York: Farrar, Straus and Cudahy.
- Pollard, John Francis (1985). The Vatican and Italian Fascism, 1929-32: A Study in Conflict. Cambridge: Cambridge University Press. ISBN 978-0-521-02366-5.
- Pollard, John F. (2014). The Papacy in the Age of Totalitarianism, 1914-1958. Oxford history of the Christian Church. Oxford; New York, NY: Oxford University Press. ISBN 978-0-19-920856-2.
- Rhodes, Anthony Richard Ewart (1974). The Vatican in the Age of the Dictators, 1922–1945. New York: Holt, Rinehart and Winston. ISBN 978-0-03-007736-4.
- Riccards, Michael P. (1998). Vicars of Christ: Popes, Power, and Politics in the Modern World. New York: Crossroad. ISBN 978-0-8245-1694-9.
- Suzzallo, Henry, ed. (1935). The National Encyclopedia. Vol. 10. New York: P.F. Collier & Son Corporation.
- Zuccotti, Susan (2002). Under His Very Windows: The Vatican and the Holocaust in Italy. Yale nota bene. New Haven, Conn.: Yale University Press. ISBN 978-0-300-09310-0.

Archival sources

- Jacuzio, Raffaele; Alfredo Rocco, Alfredo (1932). Commento della nuova legislazione in materia ecclesiastica (in Italian). Turin: Unione tipografica editori torinese. pp. viii, 693. OCLC 250715403. Archived from the original on 18 June 2019. Via
