= Capture of Rome =

1870 completion of Italian unification

- Part of the unification of Italy
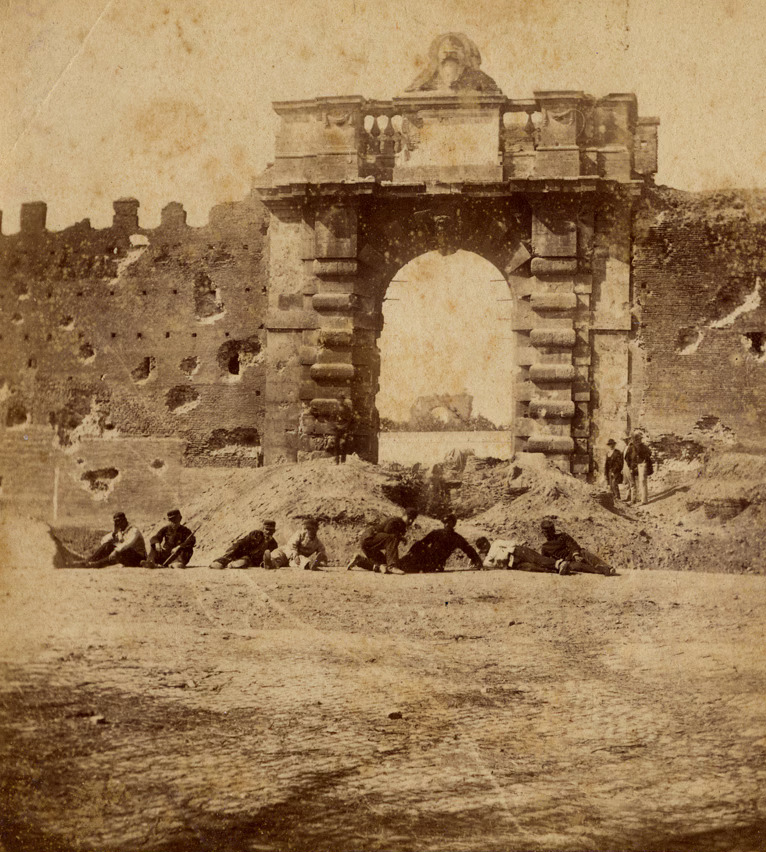
- Barricades at Porta San Giovanni, photographed on 21 September 1870, after the breach of the Aurelian Walls
Date	20 September 1870
Location	Rome
Result	Italian victory: Fall of the Papal States; End of the temporal power of the Holy See; Onset of the "Prisoner in the Vatican" period of the Holy See; Completion of the Italian unification; Rome becomes the capital of Italy
Territorial changes	Annexation of Rome and Lazio by the Kingdom of Italy

Belligerents
Kingdom of Italy	Papal States

Commanders and leaders
(Kingdom of Italy) Victor Emmanuel II (Kingdom of Italy) Raffaele Cadorna	Pope Pius IX Hermann Kanzler

Strength
50,000	13,157

Casualties and losses
49 killed 132 wounded	19 killed 68 wounded

The capture of Rome (Italian: Presa di Roma) occurred on 20 September 1870, as forces of the Kingdom of Italy took control of the city and of the Papal States. After a plebiscite held on 2 October 1870, Rome was officially made capital of Italy on 3 February 1871, completing the unification of Italy (Risorgimento).

The capture of Rome by the Royal Italian Army brought an end to the Papal States, which had existed since the Donation of Pepin in 756, along with the temporal power of the Holy See, and led to the establishment of Rome as the capital of unified Italy. It is widely commemorated in Italy, especially in cathedral cities, by naming streets for the date: Via XX Settembre (spoken form: "Via Venti Settembre").

== Background ==
The Kingdom of Italy (light blue) and the Papal States (lavender) in early 1870

In 1859, during the Second Italian War of Independence, much of the Papal States had been conquered by the Kingdom of Sardinia under Victor Emmanuel II. The next year, Giuseppe Garibaldi's Expedition of the Thousand resulted in the annexation of the Kingdom of the Two Sicilies by Sardinia, leading to the proclamation of the Kingdom of Italy on 17 March 1861. The new state had not yet incorporated Rome and the surrounding region of Lazio, which remained part of the Papal States, and Veneto, which was ruled by Austria as a crown land and would only be annexed in 1866, after the Third Italian War of Independence.

The first Prime Minister of Italy, Camillo Benso, Count of Cavour, died soon after the proclamation of Italian national unity, leaving to his successors to solve the knotty Venetian and Roman problems. Cavour had firmly believed that without Rome as the capital, Italy's unification would be incomplete. "To go to Rome", said his successor, Bettino Ricasoli, "is not merely a right; it is an inexorable necessity." In regard to the future relations between church and state, Cavour's famous dictum was, "A free Church in a free State"; by which he meant that the former should be entirely free to exercise her spiritual powers and leave politics entirely to the latter.

On 27 March 1861, the new Italian Parliament met in Turin and declared Rome the capital of Italy. However, the Italian government could not take its seat in Rome because it did not control the territory. Also, a French garrison was maintained in the city by Emperor Napoleon III in support of Pope Pius IX, who was determined not to hand over temporal power in the State of the Church.

=== Franco-Prussian War ===
On 13 and 18 July 1870, in the last months of the papacy's rule over Rome, the First Vatican Council which had begun in 1869 affirmed the doctrine of papal infallibility. Then, bishops left Rome due to opposition stance, or for a summer break. The First Vatican Council never reconvened, and was formally closed only on 20 October 1870.

Also in July 1870, France declared war on Prussia, and by early August, Napoleon III recalled his garrison from Rome. The French not only needed the troops to defend their homeland, but were concerned that Italy might use the French presence in Rome as a pretext to join the war against France. Already in 1866, after the Austro-Prussian War had begun in June, Italy took advantage and attacked Austria to gain territory, and thus allied with Prussia. With Papal Rome still guarded by French forces, Italian public opinion again favored the Prussian side at the start of the Franco-Prussian War. The removal of the French garrison allowed Italy to remain neutral and eased tensions between France and Italy.

It was only after the surrender of Napoleon III and his army at the Battle of Sedan on 2 September that the situation changed radically. The French Emperor was captured and deposed. The best French units had been captured by the Prussians, who quickly followed up their success at Sedan by marching on Paris. Faced with a pressing need to defend the capital with its remaining forces, the provisional government of the newly proclaimed French Republic was clearly not in a military position to retaliate against Italy. In any case, the republican government was far less sympathetic to the Holy See than the Empire and did not possess the political will to protect the pope's position.

== Prelude ==
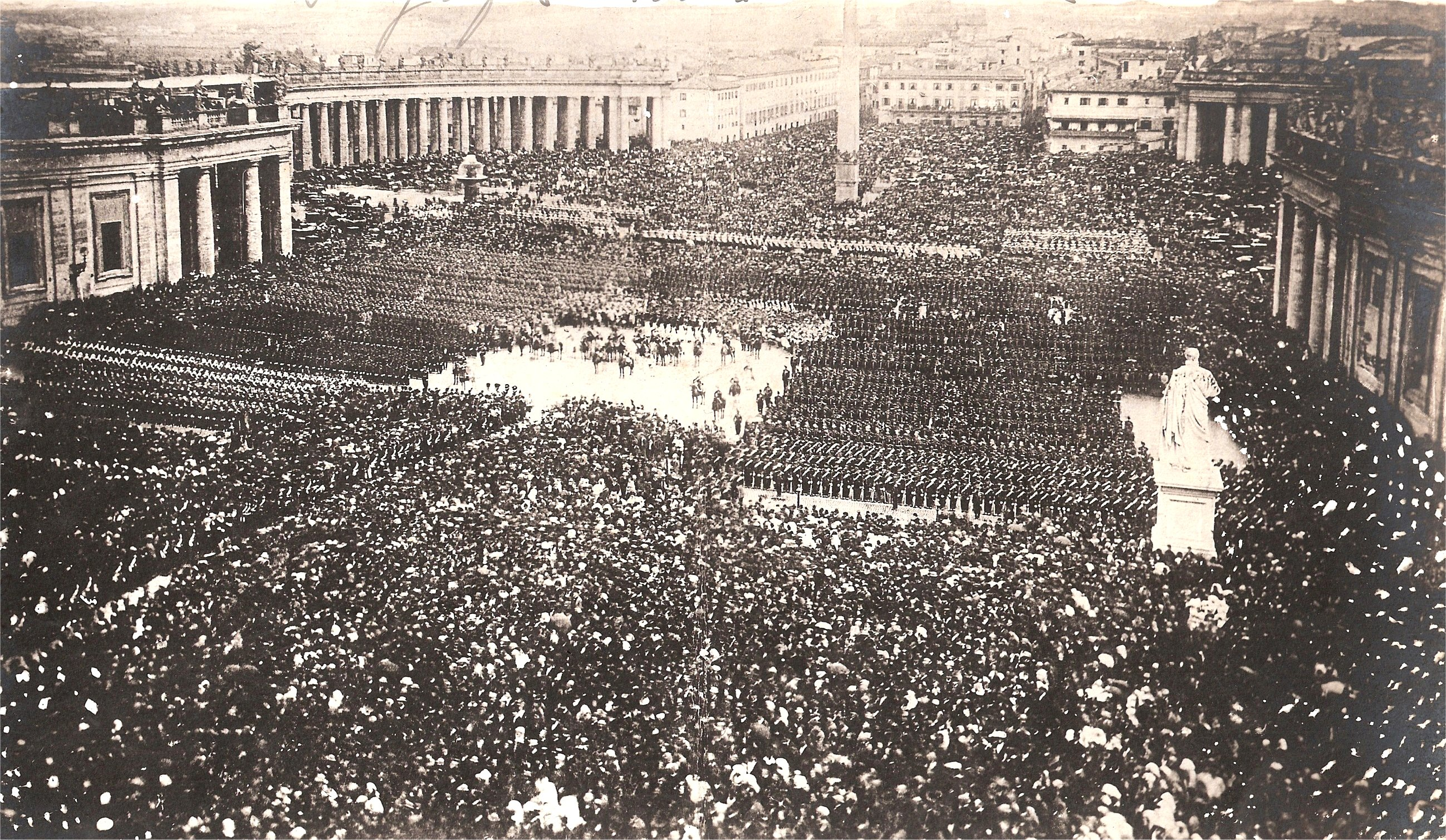
Pope Pius IX blesses his troops for the last time, at St. Peter's Square, 25 April 1870

In early September 1870, King Victor Emmanuel II sent Count Gustavo Ponza di San Martino to Pope Pius IX offering a face-saving proposal that agreed to the peaceful entry of the Italian army into Rome, under the guise of protecting the pope. Along with this letter, Ponza carried a list of provisions from Italian Prime Minister Giovanni Lanza, setting out ten articles as the basis of an agreement between Italy and the Holy See.

The Pope would retain his sovereign inviolability and prerogatives. The Leonine City would remain "under the full jurisdiction and sovereignty of the Pontiff". The Italian state would guarantee the pope's freedom to communicate with the Catholic world, as well as diplomatic immunity both for papal nuncios and envoys in foreign lands and for foreign diplomats at the Holy See. The government would supply a permanent annual fund for the pope and the cardinals, equal to the amount currently assigned to them by the budget of the pontifical state, and would assume all Papal civil servants and soldiers onto the state payroll, with full pensions as long as they were Italian.

According to Raffaele De Cesare, the Pope's reception of San Martino on 10 September 1870 was unfriendly. Pius IX allowed violent outbursts to escape him. He threw the King's letter on the table and expressed his anger, suggesting that the recipients were disloyal and lacking in faith. After calming down, he remarked that he was neither a prophet nor the son of a prophet, but predicted that they would never enter Rome. San Martino was so upset that he left the following day.

Ponza then informed Lanza of the pope's refusal of the ultimatum. The next day, 11 September, Italian troops led by General Raffaele Cadorna entered the Papal States with the objective of taking Rome, occupying the port city of Civitavecchia on 16 September. The papal garrisons had retreated from Orvieto, Viterbo, Alatri, Frosinone and other strongholds in Lazio. Under instructions from the Italian government, which still hoped to avoid seizing the capital by force, Cadorna sent a final appeal to the Papacy later the same day for the peaceful surrender of Rome. In a letter addressed to General Hermann Kanzler, commander of the Papal troops in Rome, he highlighted "the strength of the forces involved in the attack compared to those on the defense", and renewed the request that the Papal army offered no resistance. Kanzler refused, responding to Cadorna that he and the Italian government would be responsible, "before God and before the tribunal of history", for any casualties that would result from an attack.

== The capture of Rome ==
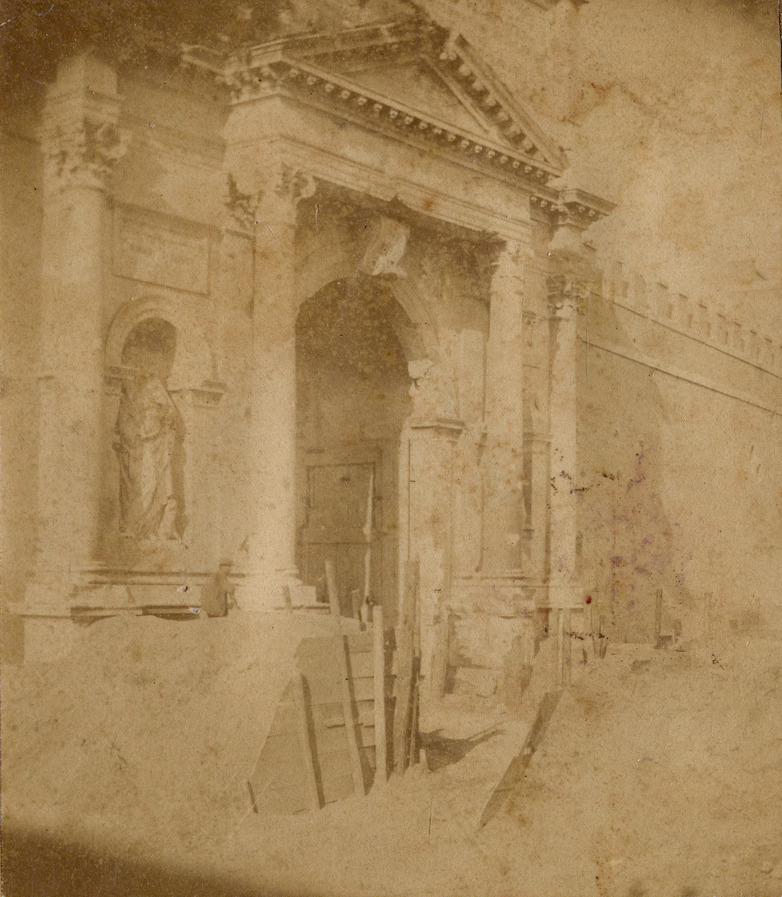
Porta Pia on 21 September 1870, following the breach of the Aurelian Walls

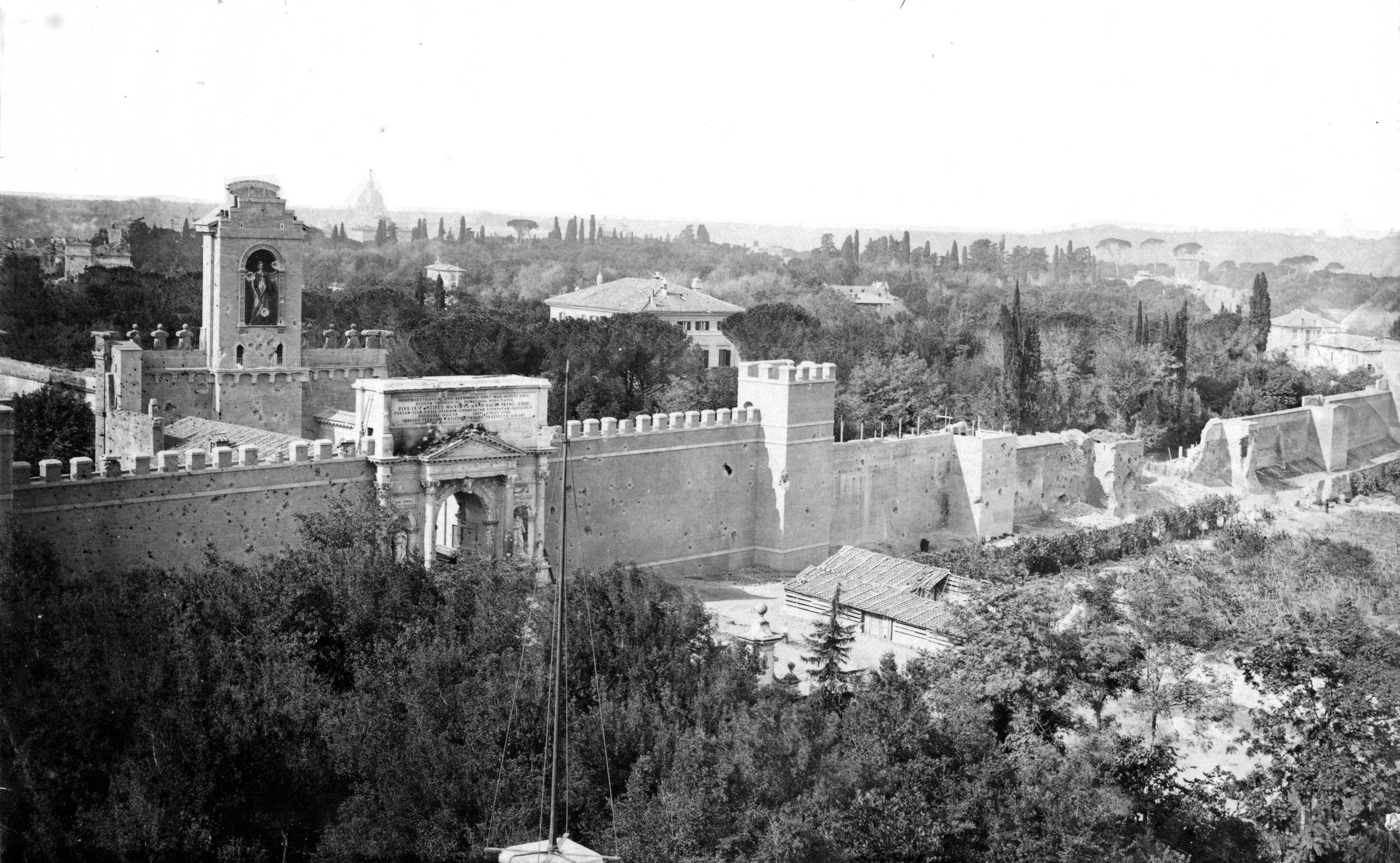
The breach in the Aurelian Walls (right), near Porta Pia (left), opened by Italian artillery fire during the Capture of Rome, in a contemporary photograph

On 18 September, Minister of War Cesare Ricotti-Magnani gave Cadorna the order to attack Rome, but informed that the Leonine City, which would be reserved for the pope, should be spared, while also advising moderation. The plan of attack was left entirely up to the general. When the Italian army approached the city's ancient Aurelian Walls, the Papal force, commanded by General Kanzler, was composed of the Swiss Guard, the Palatine Guard, and the Papal Zouaves—volunteers from France, Austria, the Netherlands, Spain, and other countries—for a total of 13,157 defenders against some 50,000 Italians. The American consul in Rome, Maitland Armstrong, described the civilian population as unwilling to defend the pope's rule, and only two hundred people in the whole city answered the papacy's call for volunteers.

The Italian army reached the Aurelian Walls on 19 September and placed Rome under siege. Pius IX decided that the surrender of the city would only be granted after his troops had put up enough resistance, to make it plain that the Italian takeover was achieved through force and not freely accepted. At 5 a.m. on 20 September, Italian artillery began firing at the city walls. Cadorna commanded the major line of assault, while troops on the other side of the city, charged with creating a distraction, were led by General Nino Bixio. After a few hours, the Italian army breached the Aurelian Walls near Porta Pia, through where the troops flooded into Rome. Forty-nine Italian soldiers and 19 Papal soldiers died in the fighting. According to slightly different figures in a 2009 history of the Vatican military, the defence of Rome left 12 dead and 47 wounded among the Papal forces and 32 dead plus 145 wounded of the regular Italian troops.

By 6 a.m., one hour after the attack began, foreign envoys began to arrive at the Apostolic Palace to meet the pope, including the ambassadors of France, Austria-Hungary and Prussia. Pius, members of his entourage, and the diplomatic corps later gathered at his library, where, at around 9 a.m., he received the news from Kanzler's chief of staff of the opening of the breach near Porta Pia. Shortly afterwards, the terms of the Act of Capitulation were presented by Cadorna and signed by Kanzler at Villa Albani, by which all of Rome, excluding the Leonine City, came under control of the Royal Italian Army. A white flag was hoisted from the dome of St. Peter's Basilica, and the defeated Papal forces were escorted to St. Peter's Square by Italian troops.

== Aftermath ==
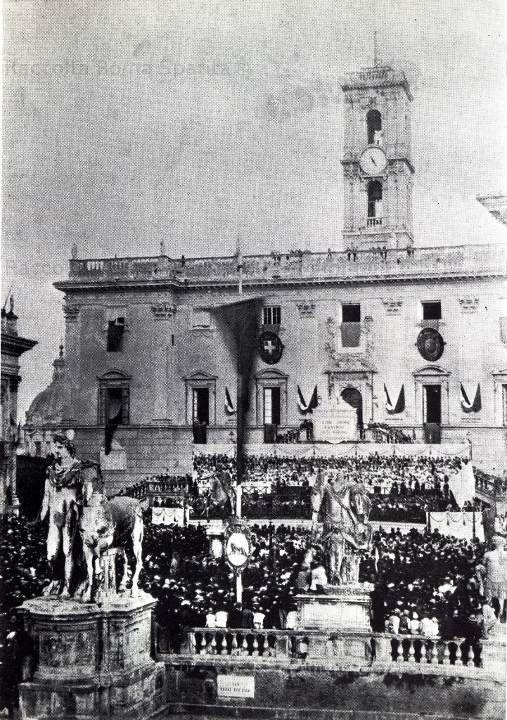
Celebration outside the Palazzo Senatorio, in 1871, of the Roman plebiscite of 2 October 1870, which confirmed the city's incorporation into Italy

As part of the terms of surrender, the Papal Army was disbanded and its foreign soldiers were immediately repatriated. The pope was allowed to retain the Swiss, Noble, and Palatine Guard units. With most of the papal military demobilized, protests against Pius took place in the Leonine City on 21 September.

To legitimize the city's annexation, Prime Minister Lanza held a plebiscite in Rome on 2 October 1870. Out of 167,548 eligible voters, an overwhelming majority of 133,681 voted in favor of union with Italy, with 1,507 votes against. On 9 October, a royal decree confirmed the incorporation of Rome and surrounding Lazio into the Kingdom of Italy. Pius denounced the plebiscite's result and instances of electoral violence employed to secure it. The pope issued the encyclical Respicientes on 1 November, in which he proclaimed a mass excommunication of the invaders, including King Victor Emmanuel II.

The Italian government promised Pius sovereignty over the Leonine City and gave him assurances of his inviolability, but the pope still would not agree to give up his claims to a broader territory, and claimed that since his army had been disbanded, apart from a few guards, he was unable to ensure public order even in such a small area. On 13 May 1871, the Italian Parliament passed the Law of Guarantees, granting the pope extensive prerogatives, such as independence on foreign affairs and an annual grant from the Italian government. While these measures satisfied the international community, including the Catholic countries, Pius refused to accept the law, proclaiming himself a "prisoner in the Vatican".

== Legacy ==
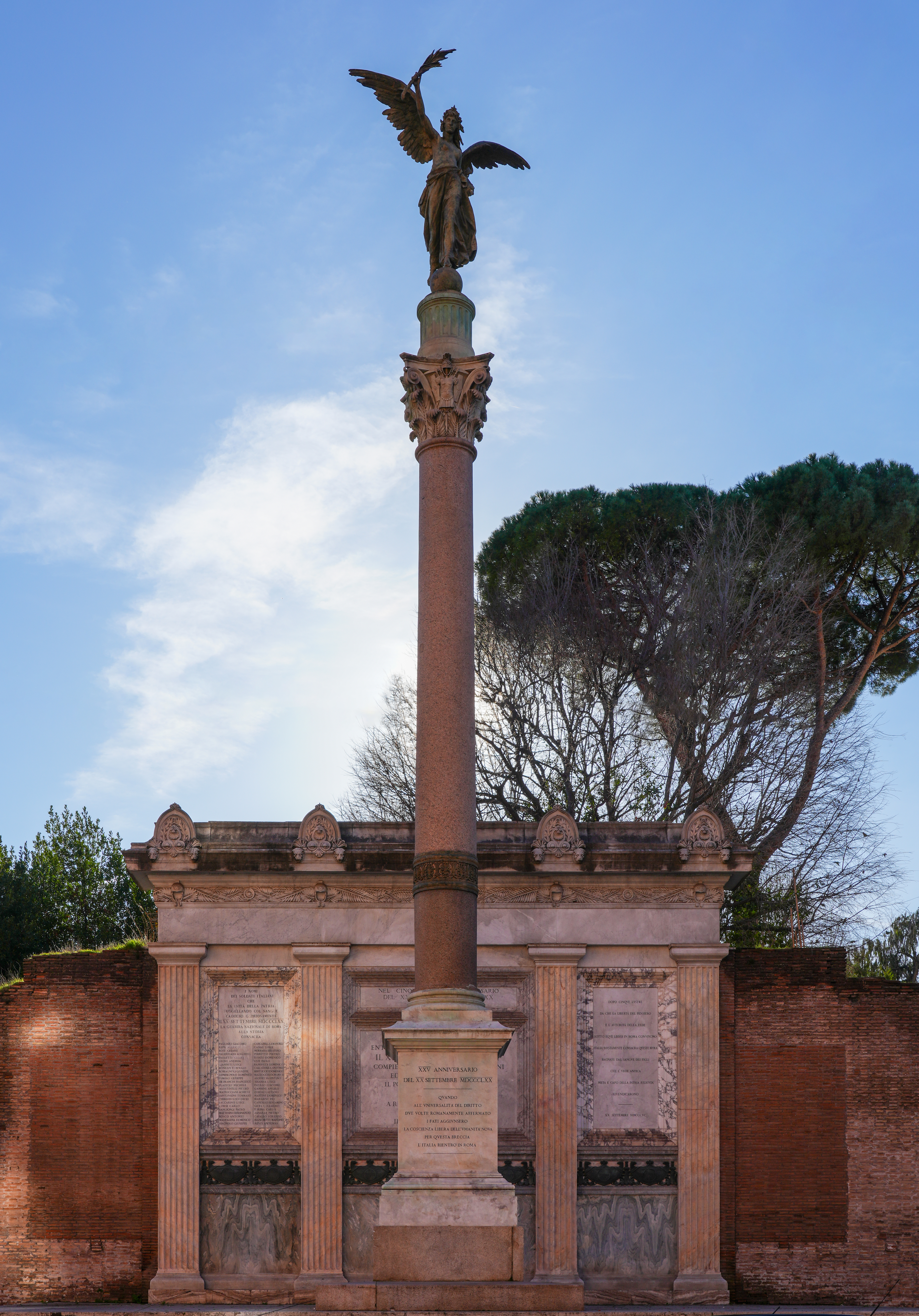
Monument and victory column to the Capture of Rome, at the site of the breach near Porta Pia

For nearly sixty years thereafter, relations between the Papacy and the Italian government were hostile, and the status of the Pope became known as the "Roman question".

Negotiations for the settlement of the Roman Question began in 1926 between the government of Fascist Italy and the Holy See, and culminated in the Lateran Pacts, signed for King Victor Emmanuel III by Benito Mussolini, Prime Minister and Head of Government, and for Pope Pius XI by Pietro Gasparri, Cardinal Secretary of State, on 11 February 1929. The agreements were signed in the Lateran Palace, from which they take their name. In the first article of the treaty, Italy reaffirmed the principle established in the 1848 Constitution of the Kingdom of Italy, that "the Catholic, Apostolic and Roman Religion is the only religion of the State". To commemorate the successful conclusion of the negotiations, Mussolini commissioned the Via della Conciliazione (Road of the Conciliation), which would symbolically link the Vatican City to the heart of Rome.

The post-World War II Constitution of the Italian Republic, adopted in 1948, states that relations between the State and the Catholic Church "are regulated by the Lateran Treaties". In 1984, the concordat was significantly revised. Both sides declared: "The principle of the Catholic religion as the sole religion of the Italian State, originally referred to by the Lateran Pacts, shall be considered to be no longer in force". The exclusive state financial support for the Church was also ended, and replaced by financing through a dedicated personal income tax called the otto per mille, to which other religious groups, Christian and non-Christian, also have access.

The flag that flew over Porta Pia during the fall of the city was preserved by the Ruspoli princes of the black nobility, first of all by Princess Cristina, and was preserved by the noble family for almost 141 years, until Prince Sforza Ruspoli handed it back to the Vatican Secretary of State, Cardinal Tarcisio Bertone on the occasion of the anniversary of Saint Michael Archangel, patron saint of the Vatican Gendarmerie corps, in 2011.

== See also ==
- History of Rome
- Roman Republic (1849–1850)
- La presa di Roma, 1905 silent film directed by Filoteo Alberini.
