= Temporal power of the Holy See =

Political and secular governmental activity of the popes of the Latin Church

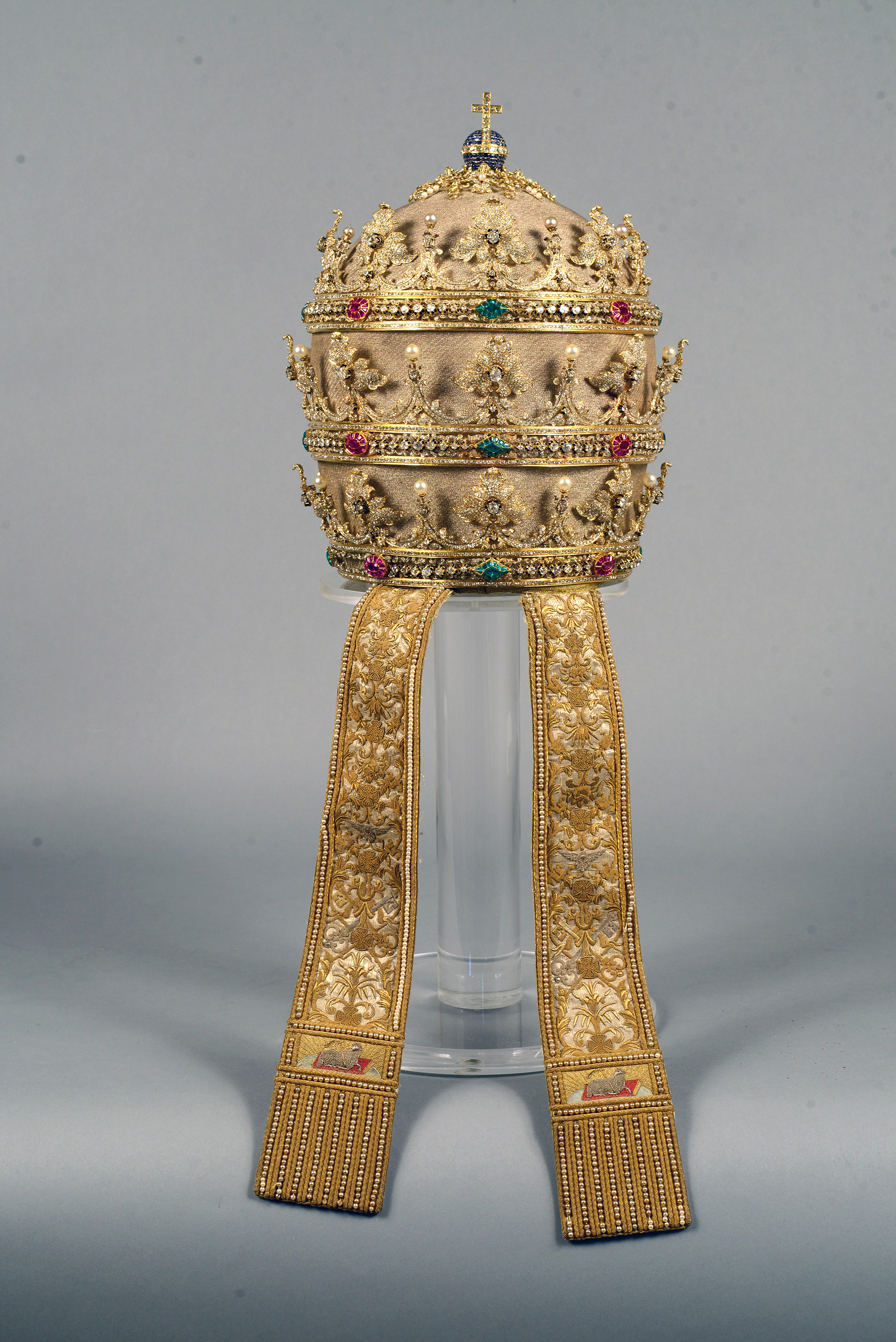
Papal tiara of Pope Pius IX, the last pope to have reigned over the Papal States

The Holy See exercised temporal power, as distinguished from its spiritual and pastoral activity, while the pope ruled the Papal States in central Italy. The Papal States ceased to exist following the capture of Rome in 1870 by the Royal Italian Army, after which its remaining territories were annexed to the Kingdom of Italy. The Lateran Treaty of 1929 later established the Vatican City, a small city-state where the Holy See currently exercises temporal powers.

== Origins ==
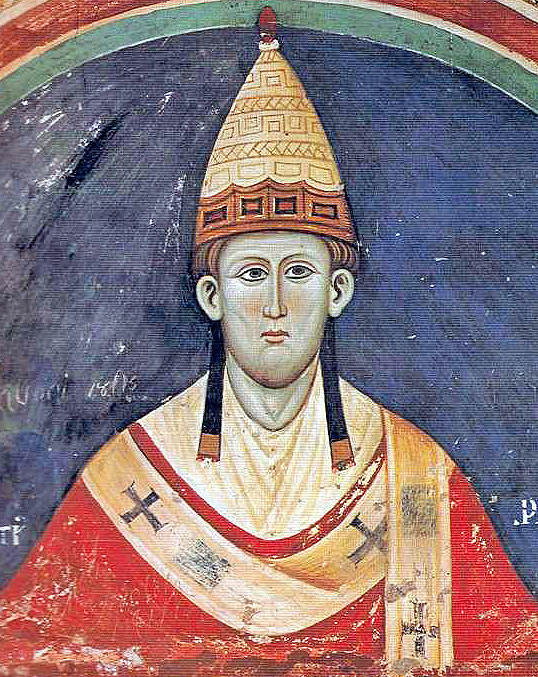
Pope Innocent III (1198–1216) in his papal tiara, which he claimed as signifying both his spiritual and (indirect) temporal power

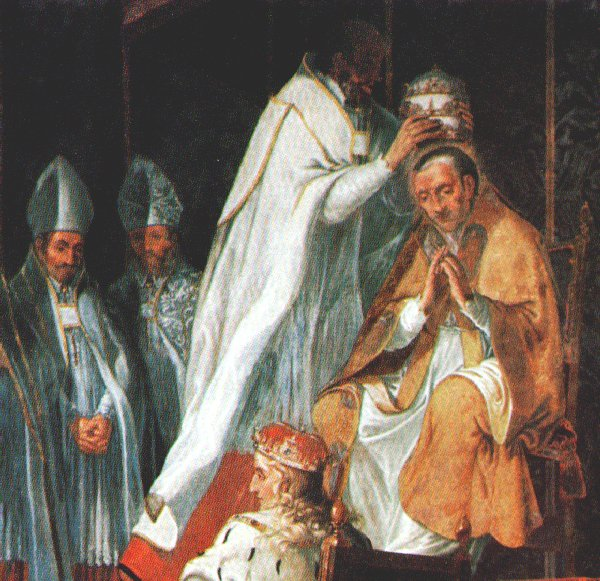
Papal coronation of Pope Celestine V

=== Patrimony of Saint Peter ===
The Lateran Palace was the first significant acquisition of the Holy See, most probably a gift from Constantine the Great. The example of Constantine was followed by wealthy families of the Roman nobility, and the residences and estates that were acquired in turn were designated the Patrimonium Sancti Petri. After the deposition of the last Roman emperor in the West in 476, the popes were subjects, first of Odoacer, then Arian Ostrogothic kings, then of the Byzantine emperors, who ruled their Italian territories via a governor called an exarch, stationed in Ravenna.

Pope Gregory II's defiance of the Byzantine Emperor Leo III the Isaurian as a result of the first iconoclastic controversy (726 AD) in the Byzantine Empire, widened the growing divergence between the Byzantine and Carolingian traditions in what was still a unified European Church. This, combined with Lombard military pressure to which the embattled empire could not respond effectively, eventually led to the establishment of the temporal power of the popes. The Duchy of Rome was an imperial territory under the Exarchate of Ravenna. With the waning of Byzantine control in the Italian peninsula, more of the management of the area fell to the popes.

=== Donation of Pepin ===
In 751 the Exarchate of Ravenna fell to Lombard King Aistulf. Five years later, Pepin the Short of the Franks defeated the Lombards and granted the lands of the Duchy of Rome as well as territory ceded by the Lombards to the Papacy in what is referred to as the Donation of Pepin, marking the true beginning of the Papal States. The area conferred upon the pope included the territory belonging to Ravenna, even cities such as Forlì with their hinterlands, the Lombard conquests in the Romagna and in the Duchy of Spoleto and Benevento, and the Pentapolis (the "five cities" of Rimini, Pesaro, Fano, Senigallia and Ancona). Narni and Ceccano were former papal territories.

However, the medieval Popes were unable to exercise effective sovereignty over these extensive and mountainous territories, given the recalcitrance of their vassals.

For over a thousand years popes ruled as sovereign over an amalgam of territories on the Italian Peninsula known as the Papal States, from the capital, Rome. In 1274 the Comtat Venaissin came under Papal control, followed by Avignon in 1348.

== Early modern period ==
Theologian Robert Bellarmine, in his 16th-century dogmatic work Disputationes, strongly affirmed the authority of the pope as the vicar of Christ. However, he reasoned that since Christ did not exercise his temporal power, neither may the pope.

In 1590, Pope Sixtus V had, of his own initiative, placed the first volume of the Disputationes on a new edition of the Index Librorum Prohibitorum for denying that the pope had direct temporal authority over the whole world. The entry concerning Bellarmin reads: "Roberti Bellarmini Disputationes de Controversiis Christianae fidei adversus huius temporis haereticos. Nisi prius ex superioribus regulis recognitae fuerint." (transl. "Disputations on the Controversies of the Christian Faith against the Heretics of this Time. Unless previously corrected according to superior rules") Sixtus V died before he could promulgate the bull which would have made this new edition of the Index enter into force. Sixtus' successor, Urban VII, asked for an examination and after it was done Bellarmine was exonerated and the book removed from the Index.

Concerning the pastoral and spiritual power of the pope, Bellarmine's Disputationes (1586–1593) and De potestate summi pontificis in rebus temporalibus (1610; Concerning the Power of the Supreme Pontiff in Temporal Matters) "gave definite form to the theory of papal supremacy".

== 19th century ==
The secular revolutionary movements of the 1800s posed a serious threat to the pope's temporal power. Avignon was seized by revolutionaries during the French Revolution in 1791, ending 450 years of papal sovereignty there. Between 1798 and 1814, the revolutionary French government invaded Italy several times and annexed the Papal States (though the papacy was restored between 1800 and 1809). Napoleon Bonaparte abolished the pope's temporal power in 1809, incorporating Rome and Latium into his First French Empire. Pope Pius VII himself was even taken prisoner by Napoleon. However, the pope's temporal power was restored by the European great powers at the conclusion of the Napoleonic Wars in the 1815 Congress of Vienna. The civil laws of the Napoleonic Code were abolished, and most civil servants were removed from office. In the coming years, rising liberal and nationalist sentiment created popular opposition to the reconstituted clerical government. This led to numerous revolts, which were suppressed by the intervention of the Austrian army.

In November 1848, during the revolutions that swept Europe in that year, the assassination of his minister Pellegrino Rossi led Pope Pius IX to flee Rome. During a political rally in February 1849, a young revolutionary priest, the Abbé Arduini, described the temporal power of the popes as a "historical lie, a political imposture, and a religious immorality".

On 9 February 1849, a revolutionary Roman Assembly proclaimed the Roman Republic. Subsequently, the Constitution of the Roman Republic abolished papal temporal power, although the independence of the pope as head of the Catholic Church was guaranteed by article 8 of the Principi fondamentali. Like the other revolutionary movements of 1848, the Republic was short-lived; Rome was eventually conquered by the French Second Republic, which restored the papacy's temporal power in the region once again.

In 1859–60, the Papal States were invaded by various republican forces seeking a unified Italian state, and lost the provinces of Romagna, Marche and Umbria. These regions were incorporated into the Kingdom of Sardinia (which thereafter became the Kingdom of Italy), and the papacy's temporal power was reduced to Rome and the region of Lazio. At this point, some ultramontane groups proposed that the temporal power be elevated into a dogma. According to Raffaele De Cesare:

The first idea of convening an Ecumenical Council in Rome to elevate the temporal power into a dogma, originated in the third centenary of the Council of Trent, which took place in that city in December, 1863, and was attended by a number of Austrian and Hungarian prelates.

However, following the Austro-Prussian War, Austria was forced to recognize the newly-formed Kingdom of Italy. As a result, most clerics lost hope of a return of the former temporal power of the Bishop of Rome. Some, primarily Italian, clergy suggested an ecumenical council to dogmatically define papal infallibility as an article of faith, binding upon the consciences of all Catholic faithful. This doctrinal view, however, initially proposed by Franciscan partisans in opposition to the prerogative of popes to contradict the more favorable decrees of their predecessors, faced significant resistance outside of Italy prior to and during the First Vatican Council.

For practical purposes, the temporal power of the popes ended on 20 September 1870, when the Italian Army breached the Aurelian Walls at Porta Pia and entered Rome. This completed the Unification of Italy (Risorgimento).

== See also ==
- Donation of Pepin
- Duchy of Rome
- Gregorian Reform
- Hierocracy (medieval)
- Interdict (Catholic canon law)
- Investiture Controversy
- Neo-ultramontanism
- Papal deposing power
- Papal Jurisdiction Act 1560
- Papal supremacy
- Patrimony of Saint Peter
- Political theology
- Pontifex Maximus
- Primacy of the Bishop of Rome
- Prisoner in the Vatican
- Roman Question
- Sic transit gloria mundi
- Symphonia (theology)
- Theocracy
- Ultramontanism
- Unam Sanctam
