= Prisoner in the Vatican =

Term for status of the Pope (1870–1929)

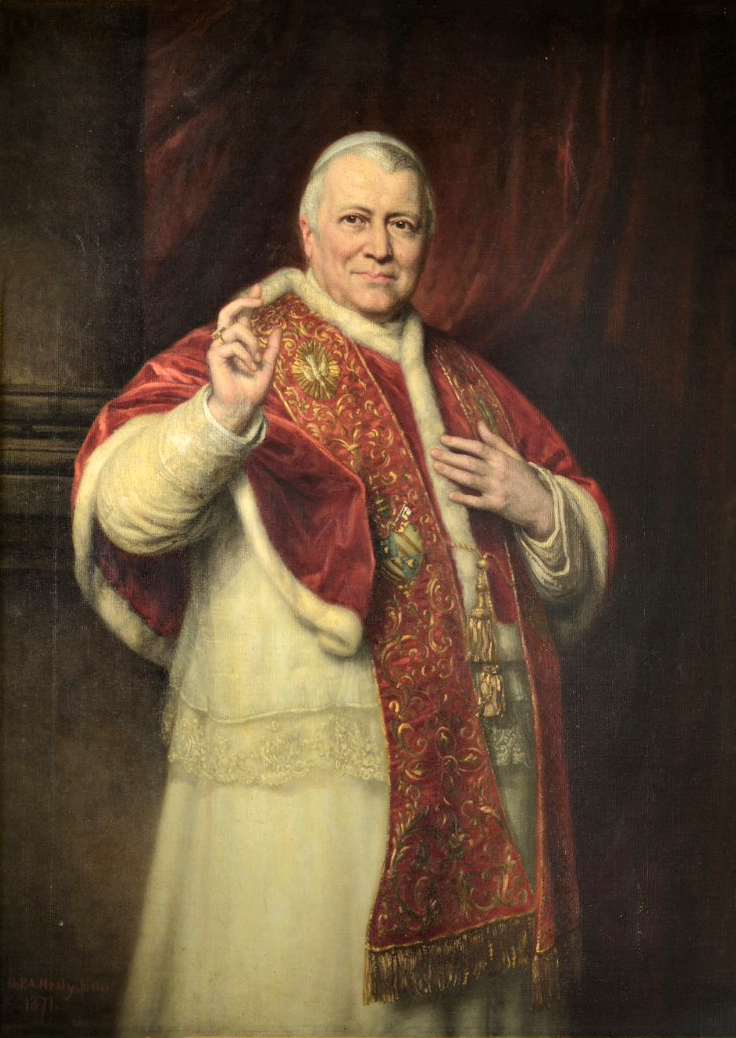
Pope Pius IX, the first pope to establish the precedent, declared himself a "prisoner in the Vatican" following the Italian Army's capture of Rome

A prisoner in the Vatican (Italian: Prigioniero nel Vaticano; Latin: Captivus Vaticani) or prisoner of the Vatican described the situation of the pope with respect to the Kingdom of Italy during the period from the capture of Rome by the Royal Italian Army on 20 September 1870 until the Lateran Treaty of 11 February 1929. Part of the process of the unification of Italy, the city's capture ended the millennium-old temporal rule of the popes over Central Italy and allowed Rome to be designated the capital of the new country. Although the Italians did not occupy the territories of Vatican Hill delimited by the Leonine walls and offered the creation of a city-state in the area, the popes from Pius IX to Pius XI refused the proposal and described themselves as prisoners of the new Italian state.

== Beginnings ==
As nationalism swept Italy in the 19th century, efforts to unify the nation were blocked in part by the Papal States, which ran through the middle of the Italian peninsula and included the ancient capital Rome. The Papal States were able to fend off efforts to conquer them largely through the pope's influence over the leaders of stronger European powers such as France and Austria. When Italian troops entered Rome, the Italian government reportedly intended to let the pope keep the part of Rome on Vatican Hill west of the Tiber, called Leonine City due to its walls built by Pope Leo IV, a small remaining Papal State, but Pius IX refused. One week after entering Rome, the Italian troops had taken the entire city save for the territories of Vatican Hill; the inhabitants of Rome then voted to join Italy (those living in the Vatican were allowed to vote outside of the Leonine walls).

For the next 59 years, the popes refused to leave the Vatican in order to avoid any appearance of accepting the authority wielded by the Italian government over Rome as a whole. During this period, popes also refused to appear at Saint Peter's Square or at the balcony of St. Peter's Basilica facing it. Popes granted the Urbi et Orbi blessings from a balcony facing a courtyard, or from inside the basilica, and papal coronations were instead held at the Sistine Chapel.

== Law of Guarantees ==
Kingdom of Italy in 1870, showing the Papal States, before the Capture of Rome.

The 13 May 1871 Italian Law of Guarantees, passed eight months after the capture of Rome, was an attempt to solve the problem by making the pope a subject of the Kingdom of Italy, not an independent sovereign, while guaranteeing him certain honours similar to those given to the king and the right to send and receive ambassadors.

The popes—Pius IX (died 1878) and his successors Leo XIII (reigned 1878–1903), Pius X (1903–1914), Benedict XV (1914–1922), and Pius XI (from 1922 until the issue was resolved in 1929)—refused to accept this unilateral decision, which, they felt, could be reversed by the same power that granted it, and which did not ensure that their decisions would be clearly seen to be free from interference by a political power. They claimed that total sovereignty was needed so that a civil government would never attempt to interfere in the governance of the universal Roman Church. Therefore, even after the Law of Guarantees, Pope Pius IX and his successors up to and including Pius XI decided not to leave the Palace of the Vatican, so as not to submit to the authority of the Italian State. As a result of the crisis, Pope Pius IX excommunicated the Italian king Victor Emmanuel II.

Especially in the strongly Roman Catholic rural areas of Italy, there was great tension between the Church and state. The newly unified Kingdom of Italy did not recognise the validity of Church weddings, while the Church maintained that the Kingdom was illegitimate and Church weddings were sufficient before God.

== Roman question ==
Following the fall of Rome, most countries continued to accredit diplomatic representatives to the Holy See, seeing it as an entity of public international law with which they desired such relations, while they withdrew their consuls, whose work had been connected instead with the temporal power of the papacy, which was now ended; however, no diplomatic relations existed between the Holy See and the Italian state.

According to Jasper Ridley, at the 1867 Congress of Peace in Geneva, Giuseppe Garibaldi referred to "that pestilential institution which is called the Papacy" and proposed giving "the final blow to the monster". This was a reflection of the bitterness that had been generated by the struggle against Pope Pius IX in 1849 and 1860, and it was in sharp contrast to the letter that Garibaldi had written to the pope from Montevideo in 1847, before those events.

The stand-off was ended on 11 February 1929, when the Lateran Pacts created a new microstate, that of Vatican City, and opened the way for diplomatic relations between Italy and the Holy See. The Holy See in turn recognised the Kingdom of Italy, with Rome as its capital, thus ending the situation whereby the popes had felt constrained to remain within the Vatican. Subsequently, the popes resumed visiting their cathedral, the Archbasilica of Saint John Lateran, situated on the opposite side of the city of Rome, and travelling regularly to their summer residence at Castel Gandolfo, 30 kilometres (19 mi) from Rome.

== See also ==
- Properties of the Holy See
- Index of Vatican City-related articles

== Bibliography ==
- Kertzer, David (2004). Prisoner of the Vatican. Boston: Houghton Mifflin Company. ISBN 0-618-22442-4.
