= Mordini (surname) =

Mordini is a surname of Italian origin. Notable people with the surname include:

- Antonio Mordini (1819–1902), Italian political figure
- Davide Mordini (born 1996), Italian football player
- Domenico Mordini (1898–1948), Italian sailor

== See also ==
- Mordini
