= Antonio Mordini =

Italian patriot and politician

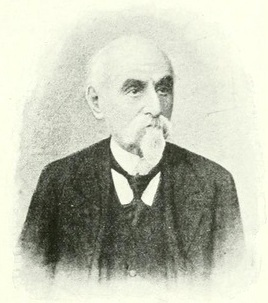

Minister for Foreign Affairs concurrently, briefly, Minister for War
- In office 23 February 1849 – April 1849
- Monarch: Leopold II, Grand Duke of Tuscany
- Prime Minister: Giuseppe Montanelli
- Preceded by: New appointment in a provisional - and, it turned out, short-lived - government

Minister for Public Works
- In office 13 May 1869 – 14 December 1869
- Monarch: Victor Emmanuel II
- Prime Minister: Luigi Federico Menabrea
- Preceded by: Girolamo Cantelli
- Succeeded by: Giuseppe Gadda

Senator
- In office 10 June 1895 – 2 March 1897
- Monarch: Umberto I
- Prime Minister: Francesco Crispi; Marchese di Rudinì

Member of the Sardinian-Piedmontese Chamber of Deputies
- In office 2 April 1860 – 17 December 1860
- Prime Minister: Camillo Benso, Count of Cavour

Member of the Italian Chamber of Deputies
- In office 18 February 1861 – 8 May 1895
- Monarchs: Victor Emmanuel II; Umberto I

Personal details
- Born: 31 May 1819 Barga, Lucca, Grand Duchy of Tuscany
- Died: 14 July 1902 (aged 83) Montecatini, Pistoa Tuscany, Kingdom of Italy
- Party: Historical Right
- Spouse: Amalia Cecchini (1846–1872)
- Children: 1. Leonardo (1867–1943); 2. Antonietta (1869-)
- Parent(s): Giuseppe Mordini; Amalia Bergamini

Antonio Mordini (Barga, 31 May 1819 – Montecatini, 14 July 1902) was a longstanding Italian patriot and, after 1861, a member of the Parliament of the Kingdom of Italy. In 1869, he served as Minister of Public Works of the Kingdom of Italy, a member of the third Menabrea government.

== Biography ==
=== Provenance and early years ===
Antonio Mordini was born overnight on 31 May / 1 June 1819 at Barga, a long established hill town north of Lucca in northern Tuscany, where his father served for a number of years as "Podestà" (leader of the municipal government). A scion of the aristocratic Mordini family, his early education, provided by private tutors under the direction of his father, had a strongly conservative and religious character, with a focus on literature and history. In 1833, he enrolled at the University of Pisa where he studied Law. He emerged four years later with a degree "in utroque iure" (in both civil and church law). In 1838, he teamed up with a number of other young lawyers, including Robustiano Morosoli to form a "philonomic" legal partnership. In the increasingly animated political and cultural spirit of Pisa at that time, Mordini was drawn to the re-emerging democratic and republican ideas that would ignite the 1848 uprisings across Italy. In 1843, Mordini, relocated to Florence the intellectual and political centre of the Grand Duchy. In 1845,Carlo Fenzi, Leopoldo Cempini, and various other contemporaries who subsequently became Italian politicians, he was listed among the promoters of a secret society intended "to contribute to the achievement of [Italian] independence [from Austrian domination] by all possible means, and to the creation of a unitary [Italian] republic". The comrades had access to a "clandestine printing press" which they used to produce political propaganda.

=== Pressures for change ===
In Rome's Quirinal Palace, a new pope was elected and installed in June 1846: The new man had studiously avoided giving commitments to any particular faction during the election process, and had a broadly liberal reputation based on his record as Archbishop of Spoleto. He was believed by those who wished to believe it to be sympathetic to reformist politics, which encouraged the Florentine democrats to intensify their activities. Towards the end of 1846, a subscription was organised in order to be able to offer a Sword of Honour to Giuseppe Garibaldi. Thanks to his exploits in Latin America, Garibaldi was already an iconic figure for those who dared to dream of Italian independence. Mordini was given the honour of delivering the sword to "The General" on his return to Italy. During the early months of 1847, Mordini was one of the organisers of numerous street protests in Florence, intended to encourage the Grand Duke to enact "liberal" reforms in Tuscany. As a lawyer, he also found himself frequently in court, appearing as a defence attorney representing arrested protesters. During 1847, he participated in the clandestine meetings of the "Florentine Revolutionary Committee" ("Comitato rivoluzionario fiorentino") which was gaining the backing of his increasingly influential friend Ferdinando Bartolommei. In September 1847, the Grand Duke was persuaded to create a National Guard ("Guardia Civica"), and Antonio Mordini immediately enlisted. On 20 December 1847, he was elected to the rank of captain within it. It was a sign of the times that on the very same day Giuseppe Mordini, his father, joined Tuscany's National Guard with the same rank.

Another sign of the times, at the end of 1847, was the establishment in Florence, of the "National Society for the Manufacture of Armaments" ("Società nazionale per la fabbricazione delle armi") under the presidency of Ubaldino Peruzzi, another well connected democratic reformer of aristocratic provenance (and, through his paternal grandmother, a Medici descendant). The members represented a range of diverse political orientations. Antonio Mordini served as the society's secretary. Among his more significant fellow members, in terms of future political developments, were Ferdinando Bartolommei, Luigi Guglielmo Cambray-Digny, Emilio Cipriani and Ferdinando Zannetti.

=== 1848 ===
On 17 February 1848, with the popular agitation in the city streets continuing to mount, fuelled by reports of insurrection in Sicily and the military successes achieved by the "forces of liberalism and patriotism", Grand Duke Leopold found himself obliged to bow to protesters' demands for a constitution. By the next month, it was clear that war between Italian patriots and Austria was imminent. Mordini was among the first to volunteer for military service. Mordini left Florence on 23 March 1848 to make his way towards northern Italy and the Austrian border. On 1 April 1848, he joined "Padua Legion" initially as a lieutenant. The legion consisted principally of university students, most of them from Padua, but numbers were subsequently greatly increased by democrat-republican volunteers from other universities, most notably Rome and Bologna. A few weeks later Mordini was appointed Captain Instructor with the legion. On 4 May 1848, he was appointed to the rank of captain in the "Cacciatori del Reno" volunteer battalion, becoming one of the officers in the general staff around Colonel Livio Zambeccari. It is hard to know the details of the fighting in which he was involved, but from his letters to his father it is clear that he fought in a number of the battalion's military engagements in and around Treviso and Venice during May and June 1848. After Treviso fell, he was recalled to Venice where he participated in the defence of the short-lived Republic of San Marco. In August 1848, following the Armistice of Salasco, whereby Charles Albert of Sardinia abandoned the Kingdom of Lombardy–Venetia to the Austrian armies, Mordini became captain of the General Staff of General Pepe, who after much soul-searching had abandoned his king and determined to remain in Venice and there continue the patriots' fight for Italian independence, entrusted by President Daniele Manin with command of the defence of Venice. For Mordini, this ensured that he continued to be involved not just on the military front, but also in the politics of the revolution, for as long as he remained in Venice.

Mordini now emerged as a left-wing opponent of the government policy of President Daniele Manin. In Venice, he was a founder member of the "Circolo italiano" and was committed to republican ideals and the necessity of sustaining the war against Austria in order that Lombardy–Venetia might become the embryo from which a liberal and democratic unified Italian state might develop. Inspired by Giuseppe Mazzini, the circle drew moral sustenance from Giuseppe Mazzini and from the political slogans of the time such as "People's War" ("Guerra di popolo") and "Italian constitution ("Costituente italiana"). In the context of the political and military situation in northern Italy during the weeks following the Armistice of Salasco, the circle's ambitions can be seen as, at best, optimistic. They were nevertheless widely shared in Venice. On 1 October 1848, Antonio Mordini and Giuseppe Revere joined to draft a document, intended for circulation throughout Italy, which was highly critical of Daniele Manin, the de facto head of government in the Republic of San Marco. The paper accused Manin of having frittered away the revolutionary momentum of the previous months, and of not having been effective in combatting government corruption. On learning of the document Manin eacted promptly: on 4 October 1848, Mordini and Revere were arrested and immediately expelled from Venice.

=== Pushing for a unified republican Italy ===
He arrived back in Florence just a few days after the fall of the government of Gino Capponi, which was followed by several months of intensifying political instability in the Grand Duchy. The Grand Duke, not without misgivings, invited Giuseppe Montanelli to form a replacement government in succession to that of Capponi. Leopold hoped that Montanelli, who was known to be popular with the protesters on the street, might be able to use his influence to calm the situation. Francesco Domenico Guerrazzi, appointed Minister for the Interior, quickly emerged as the most important member of the government. Mordini, meanwhile, became a leading member of the so-called "Popular Circle" ("Circolo popolare"), of which shortly afterwards he assumed the presidency. On 2 November 1848, he was a co-founder of a "provisional central committee", created with the objective of organising a "National Constituent Congress" in Rome, to be elected through universal suffrage. The congress should discuss how to progress the war against Austria, affirm the principle of the sovereignty of the people and create the conditions for the unification of Italy under a republican government system. Mordini himself was a powerful advocate for the republican agenda of the time and place, calling for the union of Tuscany with the Roman Republic in preparation for a wider unification process.

He promoted his vision in "La Constituente", a political journal that he launched and directed. The first edition, printed by Felice Le Monnier, was published in Florence on 23 December 1848. In several of his articles, he expressed his strong opposition to the idea, dear to the heart of its promoter, Vincenzo Gioberti, of a "federative constitution" with the pope as the head of state in a unified Italy. He closely followed political developments in Piedmont to the north and in the newly established Roman Republic to the south. He urged that Grand Duke Leopold should send a delegation of deputies to the Roman Congress convened on 5 February 1849. He believed that the presence of deputies from Tuscany could transform the Roman congress into a national Italian congress, especially once-revolutionary governments from Sicily and Venice had also seen the direction of travel and determined to send their own deputies. Mordini's was a characteristically ambitious vision, which some might have thought fanciful, but with continuing pressure on the streets for "independence" and "republican democracy", the vision was powerful enough to alarm the Grand Duke. During January 1849, Mordini's vision turned up as a parliamentary bill, accepted by the Montanelli-Guerrazzi government, and sent to Leopold for his signature. Leopold, who on 30 January 1849, had unexpectedly relocated his court to Siena, refused to sign the bill into law. Instead, overnight on 7/8 February, he fled Siena and headed for Porto Santo Stefano on the coast. On 21 February 1849, he embarked for Gaeta where he arrived on 23 February 1849. Here, under the protection of King Ferdinand II of the Two Sicilies, he evidently felt himself sufficiently distanced from the turmoil on the streets of Florence.

=== Minister ===
The constitutional position for a Grand Duchy without a constitution in which the Grand Duke had gone missing being far from clear, Giuseppe Montanelli and Francesco Domenico Guerrazzi formed a provisional government together with the law professor (and committed democrat) Giuseppe Mazzoni. Antonio Mordini, after entrusting "La Constituente" to the editorship of Leonida Biscardi, accepted an invitation from the triumvirate to join the government as Minister for Foreign Affairs. This was the best opportunity he would get to try and make a reality of his vision for a united independent Italian republic. On 13 February 1849, following the resignation of Mariano d'Ayala, responsibility for the Ministry for War was added to Mordini's portfolio.

Mordini's task was far from easy. The diplomatic delegations from other countries, taking their lead from the Sardinian-Piedmontese government, still bound by the Salasco armistice, refused to establish official diplomatic relations with the provisional government of Lombardy. Only the representative of the newly installed republican government of France declared, at least, that he accepted the offer of "unofficial" diplomatic relations. Mordini accordingly tried to enter into alliances with the de facto governments in Sicily and, closer to home, Rome and Venice, but again with little effect. His proposal to proclaim a republic based on a three-way union between Rome Tuscany and Venice was greeted initially with hesitation and then with outright opposition from his government colleague Guerrazzi, who on 27 March 1849, was granted "dictatorial powers" by the newly constituted Tuscan parliament in response to the looming defeat approaching from the north. Equally unsuccessful were Mordini's attempt to organise on behalf of the provisional government a defence force of volunteer militias, to replace the regular army which had remained loyal to the Grand Duke.

=== Government collapse ===
Not for the first or the last time, the fate of the Grand Duchy of Tuscany was now determined by events outside its borders. On 12 March 1849, the King of Sardinia-Piedmont repudiated the Armistice of Salasco. Field Marshall Radetzky with his Austrian army of some 70,000 men, reacted promptly: he seized the fortress town of Mortara through bloody but brief battle with Sardinian forces, which then fell back towards Novara in Lombardy. The Sardinian army was routed at the Battle of Novara on 22 March 1849, prompting the abdication of King Charles Albert of Sardinia-Piedmont in favour of his son. News of these developments prompted Guerrazzi to try and persuade the moderates in the Tuscan parliament to agree to prepare for the return of Grand Duke Leopold. He believed that this would be the only way to avoid an Austrian invasion of Tuscany. The parliament proved truculent, however, and on 11/12 April 1849, "Dictator Guerrazzi" suffered the twin indignities both of his own arrest and of seeing the city authorities of Florence, acting in the name of the Grand Duke, assume the power formerly exercised by what remained of the provisional government. Guerrazzi had attempted without success to reconvene the parliament which was dissolved through the intervention of the city authorities. At the end of April 1849, supported by the moral and physical force provided by an Austrian expeditionary force camped on the border near Este, the Grand Duke returned. During May 1849, Austrian troops entered Tuscany in force. Following news of the disaster at Novara Antonio Mordini had abruptly left Florence for Pisa, hoping to be able to retire from public life and live quietly with his family. After the arrest of Guerrazzi it became clear that this was not going to be an option. On 19 April 1849, Mordini succeeded in obtaining a passport-visa from the French consulate in Pisa. There followed three weeks during which he was actively sought by the police, but he managed to evade arrest, making his way (by a very indirect route that took in his parents' home in Barga) to Montecatini, near the coast, where he spent the night of 9 May 1849. The next day, he embarked from Viareggio for Corsica. Due to the threatening weather the two sailors taking him were obliged to take him all the way Bastia which had protected harbour facilities. He lingered in Bastia until September, and then made his way to Genoa, and from there to Nice.

=== Ten years in exile: time to think ===
Mordini now spent slightly more than ten years in exile, leading a somewhat itinerant existence, much of it between Sardinia, Nice and Genoa. He moved frequently, often using a false name. He also travelled further afield in central and northern Italy. He spent time in Geneva and in Turin. There were also two lengthy stays in London during 1851 and again in 1857. In London, he participated with the "National Committee" and his fellow-exile Giuseppe Mazzini, with whom for some years he worked closely. There was no immediate prospect of visiting his Tuscan homeland where the court case launched against the former provisional government under Guerrazzi reached its climax in July 1853. Guerrazzi, who was already held in detention, received a fifteen-year jail term. Mordini, tried and convicted in his absence, received a life sentence (later commuted to permanent exile). He remained in close connection with Mazzini for much of that decade, conducting a close correspondence when the two men were separated by geography. He did not participate in Mazzini's "insurrectionist projects" in Lombardy in 1852–53, however, but his own republican commitment nevertheless remained undiminished. His situation nevertheless gave him time to think, and he did become critical of the abortive uprisings that his friend had tried to stage in Mantua and Milan: he attributed their failure to an excess of haste and an insufficiency of preparation, and began to distance himself from Mazzini. Thinking through the lessons of 1848–49, he became convinced that for his vision of a unified and independent republican Italy to be realised, it would be necessary to work with the Kingdom of Sardinia, which was the only state with the political, military and economic strength to lead Italy to national independence.

Despite his misgivings over the unsuccessful uprisings of 1853, Mordini followed Mazzini's lead with preparations for the 1856 Lunigiana insurrection. The failure of this enterprise deepened and made permanent the rift between the two men. It is also evident from his surviving correspondence that he also engaged actively in collecting money and armaments to be sent to Sicily in order to support a revolutionary action planned for November 1856, but in the event these plans, again, evidently amounted to nothing: Mordini became increasingly pessimistic about the prospects for Italian independence. He distanced himself from the so-called "Genoa motion conspiracy" of June 1857, and was openly critical of the position taken by Mazzini in respect of it. In December 1857, as the result of a "precautionary measure" by the Sardinian-Piedmontese government, Mordini was obliged to relocate from Genoa, where he was living at the time. He moved to San Remo a short distance along the coast to the west. During the next couple of years, although he never abandoned the republican faith, he was more convinced than ever of the futility of actively pursuing the cause in the absence of express support from Sardinia-Piedmont, amounting, in effect, to a declaration of war against the (possibly brittle) might of the Austro-Hungarian empire. Mordini spelled out his assessment with great clarity in a letter dated 15 March 1859 to Nicola Fabrizi:

"If the Piedmontese government launches a war with a cry 'Long live Italian unity', those on our side must give our collective support, without pausing to discuss the political structure that military victory should deliver." (Note: «Se il governo piemontese inizia la guerra al grido Viva l’unità italiana, il nostro partito deve dare la sua adesione collettiva riservando la questione della forma politica a guerra vinta»)

It was the line that Giuseppe Garibaldi had backed since joining the "National society" ("Società nazionale") in 1857, but it was also the line that Giuseppe Mazzini - uncompromising as ever - continued to repudiate.

=== Italian unification and an end to exile ===
On 21 July 1858, during a highly secret eight hour meeting conducted, incongruously, in a narrow two-seater carriage circling round and round the centre of a small French spa resort (and without even the presence of note-takers or other diplomatic support staff), the Sardinian head of government and the French dictator found common cause and came to a verbal agreement, on the basis of which war with Austria was provoked in March/April 1859. In military terms, it was a less uneven contest than might have been anticipated, since the Sardinian-Piedmontese army was joined by a well-equipped French army of approximately 170,000. In the Grand Duchy of Tuscany, this development was greeted with enthusiasm by republican and democratic activists impatient for a lifting of the burden of Austrian "influence". The Grand Duke's government was unable to prevent numbers of young Tuscan volunteers from heading north to join the Franco-Piedmontese forces. Leopold II came under seemingly irresistible pressure for Tuscany to join the war alongside the armies of the Sardinian-Piedmontese and their French allies. After several days of dithering, the Grand Duke complied with the growing demands on the city streets and on 27 April 1859, abdicated in favour of his son. In reality, father and son both fled to Austria, leaving Tuscany administered by another provisional government, this time under the leadership of Ubaldino Peruzzi, Vincenzo Malenchini and Alessandro Danzini. On 3 May 1859 the provisional government revoked Mordini's exile, opening the way for him to return to the family home at Barga.

He left Barga again on 19 June 1859 in order to join up with Garibaldi who was leading a rapidly expanding volunteer army at Valtellina, the area surrounding Sondrio, close to the 3-way alpine Lombard border with Austria and Switzerland. Mordini now participated in the War of Independence in the élite "Cacciatori delle Alpi" ("Alpine Hunters'") unit, under the command of General Giacomo Medici. He remained in the mountains only a few weeks, however. By 11 July 1859 he was in Turin, pleading the case (and voting) for an immediate annexation of Tuscany to Sardinian-Piedmont at the negotiations being held to finalise terms for the Armistice of Villafranca, which was finalised the next day. He was still arguing in favour of such a development as a member of the "Tuscan Assembly", to which he was elected in August 1859, urging that diplomatic procrastination be set aside and that the Assembly itself might decide the matter. In the end, the annexation of Tuscany to the Kingdom of Sardinia-Piedmont was deferred till the next year, taking place at the same time as the annexation of other parts of central Italy, and only with the backing of a referendum, which was held on 12 March 1860. After that, in the election of (in Tuscany) 25 and 29 March 1860, he was elected to parliament by the voters of the electoral college for Borgo a Mozzano.

=== In Sicily with Garibaldi ===
The parliamentary session that ran from 2 April 1860 till 17 December 1860 was the final session of the Sardinian-Piedmontese parliament. The next session, running from 18 February 1861 till 7 September 1865, would be the first such session in the new Kingdom of Italy. Mordini was present early in June 1860 for the vote to approve the transfer of Nizza/Nice - hitherto a territory of Sardinia-Piedmont - to the French Empire. This was part of the price for French support in the recent war against Austria. Mordini voted against the motion. After that he was absent from the chamber for the rest of the parliament. A few days after the vote on Nice/Nizza he joined the so-called Expedition of the Thousand, a volunteer army organised by Giuseppe Garibaldi in order to capture the Kingdom of the Two Sicilies as part of the still incomplete unification project. Garibaldi had been born in Nice/Nizza, and would never forgive the perfidious Sardinians for having given away the city of his birth as part of the price for securing French support in the recent war of independence against the Austrians. He was no doubt appreciative of Mordini's action in having voted against the sacrifice. He was also an admirer of Mordini's skills as a political operator. The conquest of Sicily was accomplished during the summer. On 20 June 1860, Garibaldi promoted Mordini to rank of lieutenant colonel and appointed him the presidency of the "War Council" ("Tribunale militare" or, sometimes, "Consiglio di guerra"), based in Palermo. Further promotion followed. On 3 September 1860, he was appointed "auditore generale militare" (loosely, "army auditor general") which came with membership of Garibaldi's "general staff" team. That turned out to be no more than a stepping stone, however: on 17 September 1860, Antonio Mordini was appointed interim governor ("prodittatore" - loosely "acting dictator") of Sicily following the resignation of Agostino Depretis, the previous incumbent.

The Sardinia-Piedmont government leader Cavour was impatient for the immediate incorporation of Sicily into a united Italy. Giuseppe Garibaldi was as committed to Italian unification as anyone, but his republican ideals were far removed from Cavour's pragmatic statist vision. His instinctive mistrust of the Kingdom of Sardinia-Piedmont had been confirmed and intensified by the sacrifice of Nice/Nizza. He felt no urgent need to follow Cavour's choreography. In strategic terms, there are suggestions that he may have sensed that by taking a few more months to consolidate his hold on the southern end of the Italian peninsular, he might find a way to open up opportunities to conquer Rome and the Papal States from the south. (The immediate impediment to such a conquest, from whatever direction, was the pope and the presence in Rome of a small but presumably effective French garrison.) Agostino Depretis had seen it as his mission to persuade Garibaldi to relinquish control of Sicily in favour of the unification project: he had failed. Antonio Mordini, who served as "prodittatore" between September and December 1860, was clearly Garibaldi's man and not Cavour's. In addition, Cavour mistrusted Mordini because of his close association during the early 1850s with Giuseppe Mazzini. Cavour also mistrusted and loathed Mazzini. Pressure for progress came not just from Cavour, however. Popular pressure for unification with the rest of Italy was widespread across Sicily itself. Mordini accordingly came up with a plan to convene an elected Sicilian assembly, which would be tasked with discussing conditions for such an annexation, including the harmonisation of Sicilian laws with the "Statuto albertino" (constitution) of Sardinia-Piedmont (on which the constitution of Italy would be based). Elections were set for 1 October 1860. The plan became impractical shortly afterwards because of a decision by Giorgio Pallavicino, the "prodittatore" in Naples (and an appointee of Cavour's) to announce a unification plebiscite for 21 October 1860. Garibaldi and Mordini found themselves unable to resist the pressures to follow suit in respect of Sicily.

On 19 October 1860, two days before the plebiscite, he nevertheless implemented a suggestion from his friend, the liberal historian Michele Amari and appointed a Council of State, comprising 38 members, and chaired by Gregorio Ugdulena. A few days later the Council convened in the aftermath of the plebiscite and drafted a report to be sent to the future National Parliament. In it they advocated a decentralised structure for the Italian state that would ensure a powerful measure of regional political and administrative autonomy for Sicily, together with the safeguarding of Sicilian traditions more broadly.

The plebiscite results were announced formally on 4 November 1860. Three days later Victor Emmanuel II of (at this stage) Sardinia-Piedmont made his triumphal entry into Naples, flanked by Garibaldi, Pallavicino and Mordini. Three weeks later, on 1 December 1860, the king arrived in Palermo and officially took possession of the island, thereby bringing to an end Mordini's term as "prodittatore". Mordini moved north to Naples where he resumed his duties as "auditore generale militare" (loosely, "army auditor general") for the "Southern Army" (as Garibaldi's much expanded volunteer force was by this time becoming known), remaining in post till the end of February 1861. In the General Election of 27 January 1861, the voters of the third electoral college for Palermo elected him as a member of parliament. He would continue to sit as a member of the Chamber of Deputies (lower house of parliament) without a break until 1895. He is identified in some sources between 1861 and 1867 as a parliamentarian from the "extreme left", though there are indications that by 1861, his "extremist" tendencies were already rather less on show than they had been before unification.

=== Italian parliamentarian ===
In view of Mordini's shrill advocacy of republican democracy throughout and beyond the 1840s, and his closeness at different times during the 1850s both to Mazzini and to Garibaldi, it might have been thought that he would pursue his parliamentary career as something of a leftist firebrand. It turned out, in the event, that his experiences of the unification project during 1859 and 1860 had significantly modified his political outlook. Setting aside his earlier republicanism, he concentrated instead on the pressing issue of "constitutionalising the Garibaldi movement". He campaigned for the abandonment of the insurrectionist habits which for a generation had been mainstream among his fellow democrat activists, and for the total integration of the individuals concerned into the political institutions of the Italian monarchy. It is misleading to think in terms of twentieth century political parties in any European country during the mid-nineteenth century, but it was certainly case that in the Chamber of Deputies there was a powerful tendency for various groupings of the politically like-minded to form. Mordini made it his mission to create a large, broadly based grouping of the constitutional moderate left, while excluding and marginalising those on the fringes. On one or two of the major issues of domestic politics, and especially with respect to any matters touching on the further establishment of national unity, he would be content to collaborate with parliamentary colleagues from the right. This pragmatic approach became more structured between 1866 and 1869, when Mordini succeeded in pulling together elements from the moderate left and the moderate right to form a so-called "third party" which, despite being somewhat ephemeral in character by the standards of later centuries, frequently exercised a level of influence in the parliamentary politics of the period that was very far from marginal.

The first and probably most significant indication that Mordini had come to see himself as a force for moderation came in August 1862, when he teamed up with fellow parliamentarians Nicola Fabrizi and Salvatore Calvino, to make the trip to Sicily in order to dissuade Garibaldi from setting out on his ill-fated "liberation expedition" towards Rome. The intention, on the part of the passionately anti-papal Garibaldi, was to drive the pope from Rome, but Garibaldi and his men would be intercepted in Calabria, and never came close to Rome. Mordini failed to dissuade Garibaldi from setting out. Furthermore, he was himself suspected of being caught up in his charismatic former comrade's "mischief making". On 27 August 1862, Mordini and the other two members of his three-man parliamentary delegation were arrested in Naples. The three of them were incarcerated in the Castel dell'Ovo for more than six weeks, released only in the context of a wider amnesty granted by the king to Garibaldi and his companions in respect of the failed "liberation expedition".

The following November, addressing the Chamber of Deputies, Mordini denounced government prevarication in an effective speech which contributed to the fall of the Rattazzi government. There was no indication of any change to his now unwavering faith in Italy's constitutional monarchy, and there was no departure from his continuing belief in the possibility of a closer co-operation between Garibaldi and the king. It was precisely this which led him, during 1863 and 1864, to weave a network of connections with a number of Hungarian and Polish expatriates, and to support the insurrection that broke out in Poland in January 1863. In Mordini's judgement, the conditions were ripe for a successful intervention by another Garibaldi-led volunteer army. He saw a possibility the a successful insurrection in Poland could lead to further territorial losses by the hated Austrian empire involving Hungary and - of particular significance to Italian nationalists - the Veneto region which, despite its Mediterranean history and heritage, remained under Austrian control till 1866. These machinations and hopes turned out to be all in vain. They became intertwined with Mordini's attempts to persuade Garibaldi to accept the leadership of a political party with a "constitutional democratic stamp": he pursued his ideas with Garibaldi in April 1864, during a triumphal visit the men undertook to London (where Italian unification was viewed as a matter for much celebration by the political class, and Garibaldi enjoyed hero status). Garibaldi rejected Mordini's proposals and Mordini, having already abandoned his adherence to the "extremist" democratic left-wing of politics, became more firmly committed to the agenda of the mainstream political centre. In November 1864, he cast his vote in the Chamber of Deputies in favour of moving the capital from Turin to Florence: the move was implemented promptly, during 1865.

Mordini's acceptance into the centrist mainstream was confirmed during 1866, when he was accepted the proposal from "prime minister" Bettino Ricasoli that he should become "royal commissioner" for the city of Vicenza, a formerly (and, from the point of view of the citizenry, very unwilling) Austrian city which, in July 1866, was evacuated by the Austrian garrison in the context of that year's so-called Third War of Independence. Mordini held the office of royal commissioner between, formally, 17 July and 22 October 1866, when the plebiscite that gave effect to the annexation of the Veneto to the Kingdom of Italy rendered the position of "royal commissioner" redundant.

During the later 1860s, as the idea of an informal "third party" finally took shape (albeit only as a parliamentary grouping of members from several different moderate parties: never with any organisational structure), Mordini was widely acknowledged as the group's leader. His name began to be discussed in the context of possible ministerial appointments. The hypothesis became reality on 13 May 1869, when he was appointed Minister for Public Works in a new government established under the leadership of Luigi Federico Menabrea. However, the government fell on 11 December 1869, before Mordini had had time to implement any memorable policy initiatives as a government minister. Two years later, on 28 November 1871, as a vice-president of the chamber, it was to Antonio Mordini that the honour fell of presiding over the first session to be held following the transfer of the parliament to Rome, which had become the capital of Italy early in February of that year.

=== Amalia ===
Antonio Mordini married Amalia Cecchini in September 1866. She, like him, was from Barga. Amalia was still only 20, which made her 27 years younger than her husband. At the time of their marriage Antonio Mordini was still representing a Palermo electoral district, but in the General Election of March 1867 he stood successfully for election in Lucca (Tuscany). The Mordinis' children were born in 1867 and 1869. Amalia Mordini died tragically young, however, on 5 June 1872.

=== Later years ===
By 1872, Antonio Mordini was for most purposes aligned with the political right. On 11 August of that year, he was appointed prefect for Naples. After a government of the centre-left under his old rival Agostino Depretis came to power in Rome, Mordini felt it inappropriate to remain in office as a prefect in Naples, and in March 1876 he resigned the prefecture. He continued to serve as a member of the Chamber of Deputies without a break through this decade and the next. The election of October/November 1882, left the centre-left groupings still in the majority. The voting age and taxable income voting requirement had both been substantially lowered, so that the number of voters had increased from just over 620,000 in 1880 to just over 2,000,000 in 1882. Mordini initially retreated into opposition from the political right, but subsequently mellowed a little in his attitudes, as he recognised something of his own earlier centrist ambitions in the moves towards constructive parliamentary collaboration - sometimes termed the "Trasformismo" movement - negotiated between Depretis and the economist-statesman Marco Minghetti of the moderate right. During the later 1880s, he gradually distanced himself from the daily grind of active politics. In 1884, he turned down an offer from Depretis that he should take on the presidency (or 'speakership') of the Chamber of Deputies. In 1890, he was offered the job of foreign minister by Francesco Crispi but turned it down. He turned the same offer down again the next year when, in the context of intensifying political crisis, Crispi repeated it.

In March 1893, Antonio Mordini accepted his last important political appointment, as chairman and rapporteur of the "Commission of Seven", a parliamentary commission set up to investigate the Banca Romana scandal. The resulting report, which Mordihi drafted, was highly critical of the roles played by a number of leading left-wing politicians, including Crispi himself.

The last general election in which Mordini stood as a candidate was that of 1892, meaning that after 1895, he was no longer a member of the Chamber of Deputies. As a member of the senate, to which he was nominated on 25 October 1896, he continued to play his full part in the parliamentary process for the rest of his life.

Antonio Mordini died at Montecatini, a health resort close to his home in Tuscany, on 14 July 1902.

== Masonic involvement ==
On 2 March 1862, Mordini was initiated in the Loggia "Dante Alighieri" of Turin and in 1864, he was elected member of the Grand Orient of Italy by the Masonic Constituent Assembly of Florence, reached the 33rd and last degree of the Ancient Scottish Rite and accepted and he was a member of the Grand Consistory for the Po Valley.

== Honors ==
- Knight of the Grand Cross decorated with the Great Cordon of the Order of Saints Maurice and Lazarus
- Knight of the Grand Cross decorated with the Great Cordon of the Order of the Crown of Italy
- Knight of the Order of the White Eagle (Empire of Russia)

== Bibliography ==
- Giancarlo Poidomani, Antonio Mordini (Barga, 1 giugno 1819 - Montecatini Valdinievole, 15 luglio 1902), su Regione Siciliana. I 150 anni dalla spedizione dei mille. Biografie, 2010. URL consultato l'8 aprile 2014.
- Vittorio Gnocchini, L'Italia dei Liberi Muratori. Brevi biografie di Massoni famosi, Mimesis-Erasmo, Milano-Roma, 2005, p. 191.
- Luigi Polo Friz, Una voce. Ludovico Frapolli. I fondamenti della prima massoneria italiana, Ed. Arktos, Carmagnola, 1998, p. 13.
- Dizionario biografico degli italiani, Istituto dell'Enciclopedia Italiana.
