= Giuseppe Sirtori =

Italian general

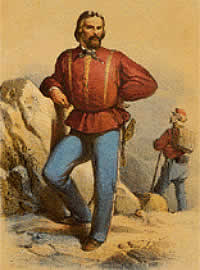

First Secretary of State, Dictatorship of Sicily
- In office 18–22 July 1860
- Preceded by: Francesco Crispi
- Succeeded by: Agostino Depretis

Captain of the Army of the Provisional Government of Milan
- In office March 18, 1848 –March 20, 1848
- Preceded by: Position established
- Succeeded by: Vacant

Personal details
- Born: 17 April 1813
- Died: 18 September 1874 (aged 61)

Giuseppe Sirtori (17 April 1813 – 18 September 1874) was an Italian soldier, patriot and politician who fought in the unification of Italy.

== Biography ==
Sirtori was born at Monticello Brianza, north of Milan. He started an ecclesiastic career, being ordained in 1838. In 1842, he went to Paris to study theology and philosophy, but, in 1840, he left the church and returned to France to study medicine. He took part in the 1848 revolution, being amongst those who forced Alphonse de Lamartine to proclaim the Republic at the Hotel de Ville.

Circumstances of Sirtori's adherence to the revolutionary movements are unclear, as documents of his life in Paris were later destroyed. Also unknown are the circumstances leading him to the Five Days of Milan (18–22 March 1848), where he was elected captain of the rebel's army. In this position he was sent to the defence of Venice, which had freed itself from the Austrian. Here he grew strife with the more moderate Venetian leader Daniele Manin, and was even accused of plotting to surrender the city (5 March 1849) during the long Austrian siege of 1849. Anyway, Sirtori was amongst the most gallant defenders of the city, which fell in August 1849.

Sirtori escaped on a French vessel, which left him in Corfu. Then he moved to Paris, where, as a fervid Republican, grudgingly witnessed to Napoleon III's suppression of the French 2nd Republic. In Lausanne, he met the Italian Republican leader Giuseppe Mazzini, becoming one of his most faithful followers. In the 1850s he was one of the main members of the Mazzinian committee in Genoa, together with Giacomo Medici, Nino Bixio and Benedetto Cairoli. He however abandoned Mazzini after the failed revolt in Milan of 6 February 1853.

Always unset, Sirtori adhered to the French-backed Lucien Murat's attempt to overthrow Ferdinand II of the Two Sicilies. However, he soon gained the enmity of the Italian patriots in France, who were afraid of a too large French control over Italy; this led Murat to jail him in an asylum in Paris. He was freed after a short stay thanks to other Italian exiled. Sirtori moved to Piedmont, where he sought for a position in the Savoy army; however, his Republican past and the Mazzini veto prevented him to take part in the successful Second Italian War of Independence (1859). He therefore switched to the Monarchic party, obtaining a seat in the Turin Parliament.

Giuseppe Garibaldi called him in his Expedition of the Thousand (1860), which would result in the Piedmontese annexion of the Kingdom of the Two Sicilies and the creation of the unified Kingdom of Italy. As Garibaldi did not want to deal with the Piedmontese Prime Minister Cavour, the latter discussed the plan with Sirtori.

Sirtori distinguished himself in the ensuing battles of Calatafimi (in which he was wounded at a leg) and Palermo, after which he was promoted as general. On July 19 Garibaldi shortly named him vice-dictator of Sicily, but Sirtori's main role was that of de facto chief of staff in the volunteer liberation army. Sirtori also took part in the battle of Volturno against the last remains of the Neapolitan troops.

After Garibaldi left to Caprera, Sirtori was assigned the task to merge the Mille's army into the new Italian Army. However, the conditions were so unfavourable that most of the volunteers disbanded; despite this, Sirtori entered the ranks of the Italian army as Tennant General (1862). His first task, as plenipotentiary in Catanzaro, in Calabria, was the suppression of the brigand bands which had appeared in great number in southern Italy after the Piedmontese occupation. His harsh methods led to his quick removal, but Sirtori continued to address the problem in a Parliament commission.

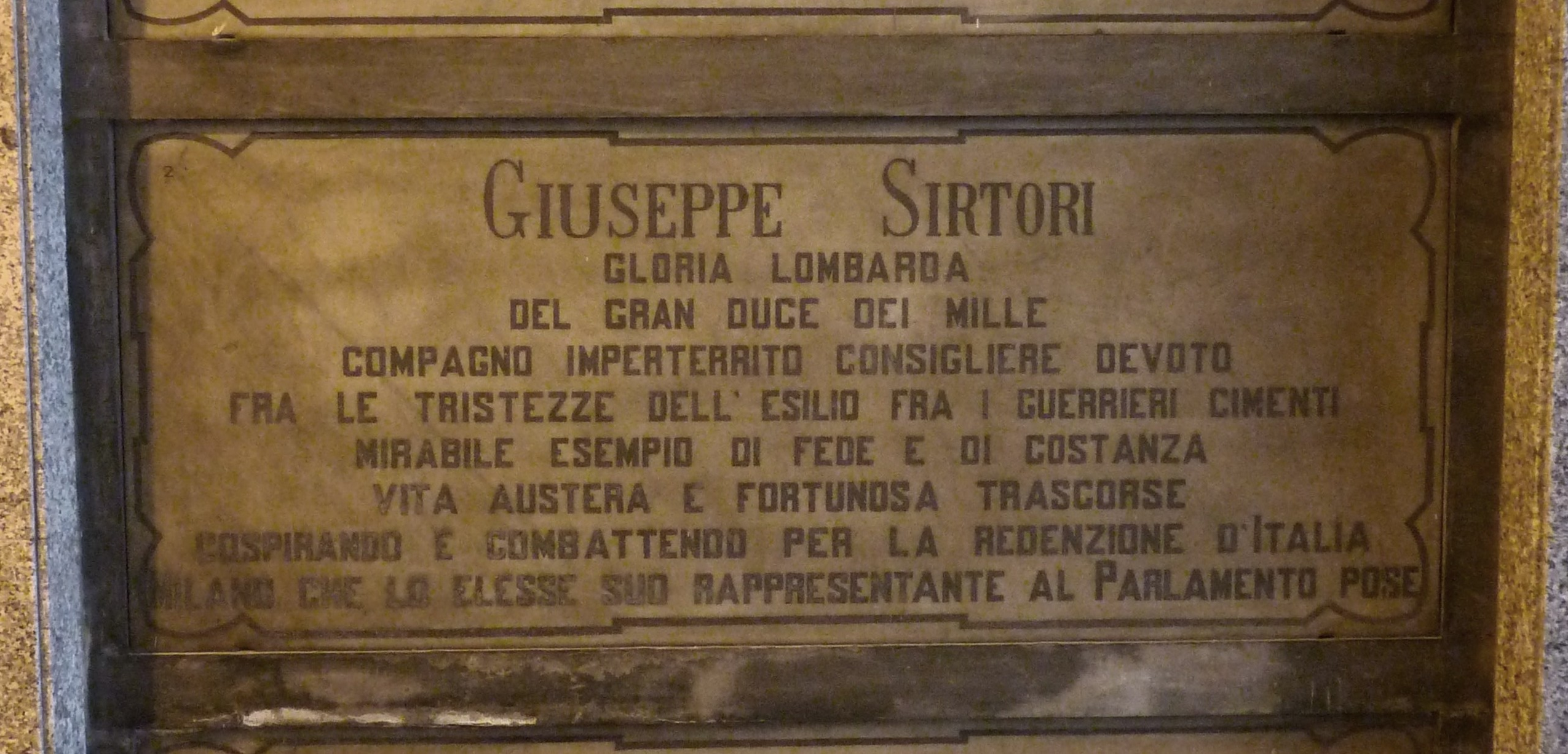
Sirtori's grave at the Monumental Cemetery of Milan, Italy

In 1866 fought as division commander in the Third Italian War of Independence. In the wake of the defeat at Custoza, he was stripped of his command after a clash with Alfonso La Marmora, the Italian chief of staff (today generally considered the main responsible of the defeat). Sirtori renounced to all his army decorations and wages. His removal led some of his enemies to accuse him of the defeat: the polemics went on until 1871, when another general, Giuseppe Govone, now turned Ministry of War, re-established Sirtori's honor, naming him commander of a division in Alessandria.

In 1867 he was elected in the Parliament in the ranks of the left. He died in Rome in 1874, where he was working in a commission for new weapons. and is buried in Milan, at the city's Monumental Cemetery.

== Ships ==
In 1916 the Regia Marina named a destroyer RM Giuseppe Sirtori. The warship was the lead ship of a class four destroyers. The Giuseppe Sirtori was scuttled in September, 1943 during the Second World War.
