= Tuscan Republic (1849) =

The Tuscan Republic is the name often given to the brief period between February 1849 when Leopold II, Grand Duke of Tuscany fled Florence and April of the same year. In fact, although Tuscany had a provisional government with strong republican tendencies during this period, a republic was never officially proclaimed.

== Flight of the Grand Duke ==
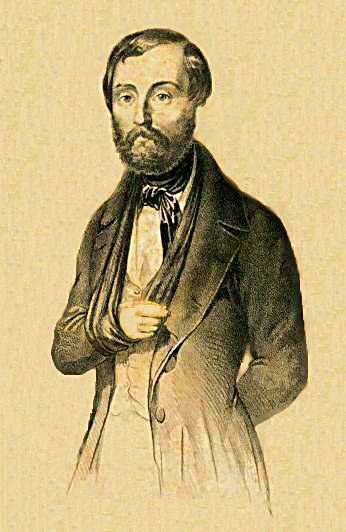
Giuseppe Montanelli

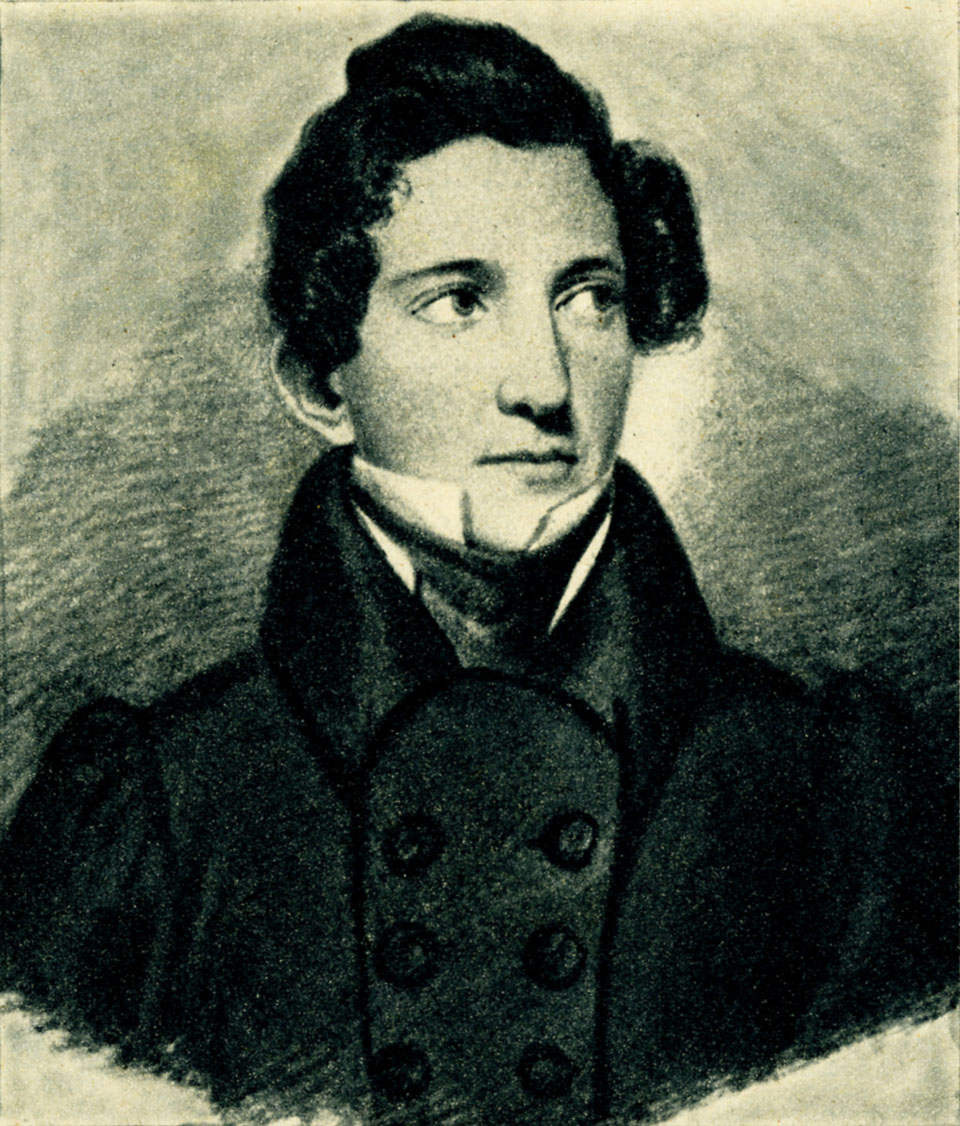
Francesco Domenici Guerrazzi

On 12 October 1848, the Grand Duke’s Prime Minister Count Capponi resigned and Leopold turned to the leader of the radical democrats Giuseppe Montanelli to form a new government. On 27 October, Montanelli took office alongside Francesco Domenico Guerrazzi, head of the Republican faction in Livorno, at the interior ministry, it:Giuseppe Mazzoni at the ministry of justice, it:Pietro Augusto Adami at finance, and Mariano d'Ayala as minister of war. The new government was no more able than its predecessor to secure a majority in parliament. As a result, the General Council was dissolved on 3 November and fresh elections called for 20 November. Amid widespread unrest the elections did not proceed smoothly, and voting had to be rerun in several constituencies. Ultimately no new political consensus emerged, and deep divisions remained between constitutional monarchists, liberals and republicans.

Political developments continued in neighbouring states. The new Prime Minister of the Kingdom of Sardinia, Vincenzo Gioberti, wanted to begin negotiations with Florence about establishing a political and military alliance. These were unsuccessful as Montanelli feared Sardinian hegemony, while Gioberti had plans for military intervention to replace the Tuscan democratic ministry with a liberal one of a similar political character to his own. In Rome, Pope Pius IX fled to Gaeta on 24 November and a Constituent Assembly was formed on 29 December; preparations began for the proclamation of a Roman Republic.

Encouraged by this example, Montanelli took steps to establish a Constituent Assembly in Tuscany too, elected by universal suffrage. On 22 January 1849, he presented a bill to achieve this. It was passed by both houses and Leopold II approved it, fearing that he would be overthrown if he did not. Leopold II moved to Siena on 30 January and on 7 February he fled Tuscany, joining the Pope in Gaeta.

== Provisional government ==
As soon as Leopold left Florence the democratic faction installed a triumvirate of Montanelli, Guerrazzi and Mazzoni. A new government was formed was elected and a government with it:Francesco Costantino Marmocchi (internal affairs); Antonio Mordini (foreign affairs); Leonardo Romanelli (justice); Pietro Augusto Adami (finance) and Mariano d'Ayala (war). Knowing that Giuseppe Mazzini was to arrive in Livorno by sea from Marseille the day after the Grand Duke’s flight, Guerrazzi instructed the governor not to let him land for fear of stoking radical republican sentiment, but his order arrived too late an Mazzini arrived to scenes of great excitement from the crowds.

The new provisional government called fresh elections, on 12 March 1849, to create a new representative Tuscan chamber of 120 members as well as to nominate 37 deputies to the proposed new Italian Constituent Assembly. Here a major difference in political approach appeared between Montanelli who was aiming to unify Tuscany with the newly-proclaimed Roman Republic, and Guerrazzi, who opposed Montanelli’s idea of an Italian Constituent Assembly.

The Tuscan Assembly met for the first time on 25 March, immediately after that crushing Austrian defeat of Sardinia at the Battle of Novara. While this signalled no further risk of political or military interference from Sardinia in the affairs of Tuscany, it significantly increased the risk of Austria intervening to restore the Grand Duke. In view of this the Assembly entrusted Guerrazzi with full powers for 20 days and decided to postpone the formal declaration of a republic. Guerrazzi thought it expedient to remove Montanelli by sending him to France on a diplomatic mission to solicit support for the provisional government. His next move was to open negotiations with the moderate liberals, possibly with a view to bringing back Grand Duke Leopold before the Austrians restored him by force.

== Restoration of the Grand Duke ==
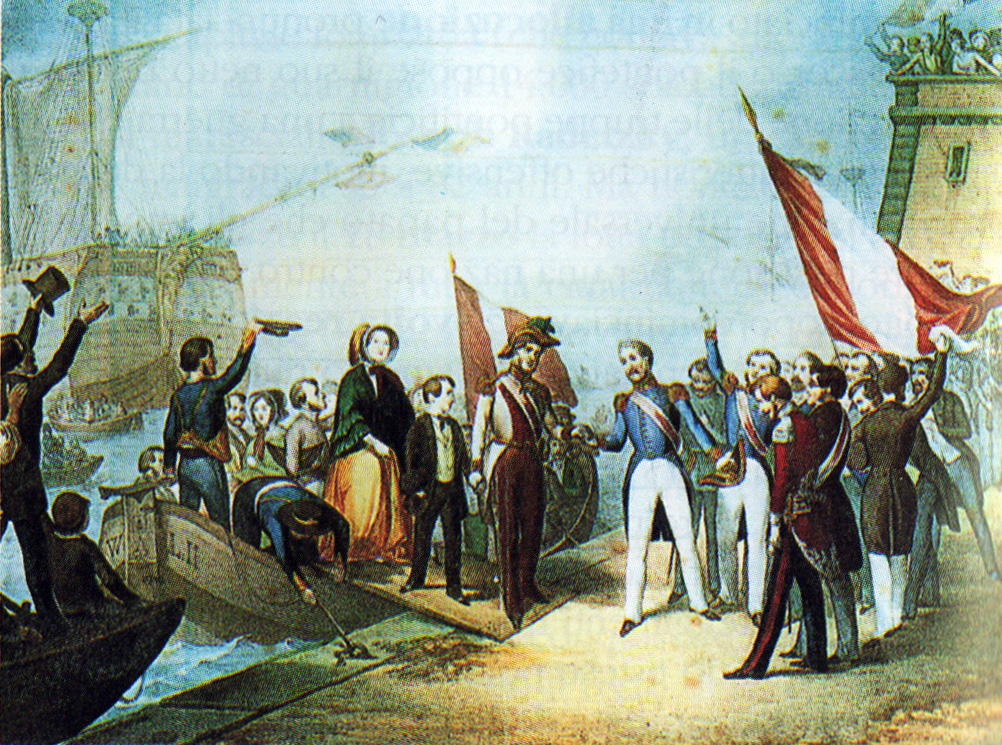
Leopold II disembarks at Viareggio

While these manoeuvres were going on fighting broke out in the streets of Florence between radicals from Livorno who supported Guerrazzi and the Florentines who were increasingly dissatisfied with him. Following this, on 12 April the city council of Florence took power in the name of the Grand Duke and set up a new provisional government commission led by Gino Capponi, Bettino Ricasoli, it:Luigi Serristori, it:Carlo Torrigiani and it:Cesare Capoquadri. The commission arrested Guerrazzi and on 17 April sent a delegation to Gaeta, headed by it:Francesco Cempini to solicit the return of the Grand Duke.

By now Leopold II had the assurance of Austrian military support, so instead of negotiating with the commission he abolished it from Gaeta, instead appointing Luigi Serristori as sole commissioner while he waited for Austrian troop to arrive. On 26 April 15,000 men under General D'Aspre entered Tuscany from the Duchy of Modena, encountering no resistance except in the Livorno, where harsh repression was necessary to put down rebellious elements and it was not taken until 11 May. The Austrians occupied Florence on May 25 and two days later Leopold II appointed a new government under it:Giovanni Baldasseroni.

On 24 July 1849 the Grand Duke returned to Tuscany, landing in Viareggio. On 28 July he entered Florence.

== Trials ==
Montanelli, still in France, was charged with high treason and tried in absentia for his role in the abortive revolution. He was sentenced to life imprisonment though he eventually returned to Tuscany in 1859. Guerrazzi was tried and sentenced to 15 years in prison, commuted in 1853 to exile in Corsica, where he remained until 1859, when he fled to Genoa.

== See also ==
- First Italian War of Independence
- Revolutions of 1848 in the Italian states
- Republic of San Marco
