= Dictator =

Political leader who possesses absolute power

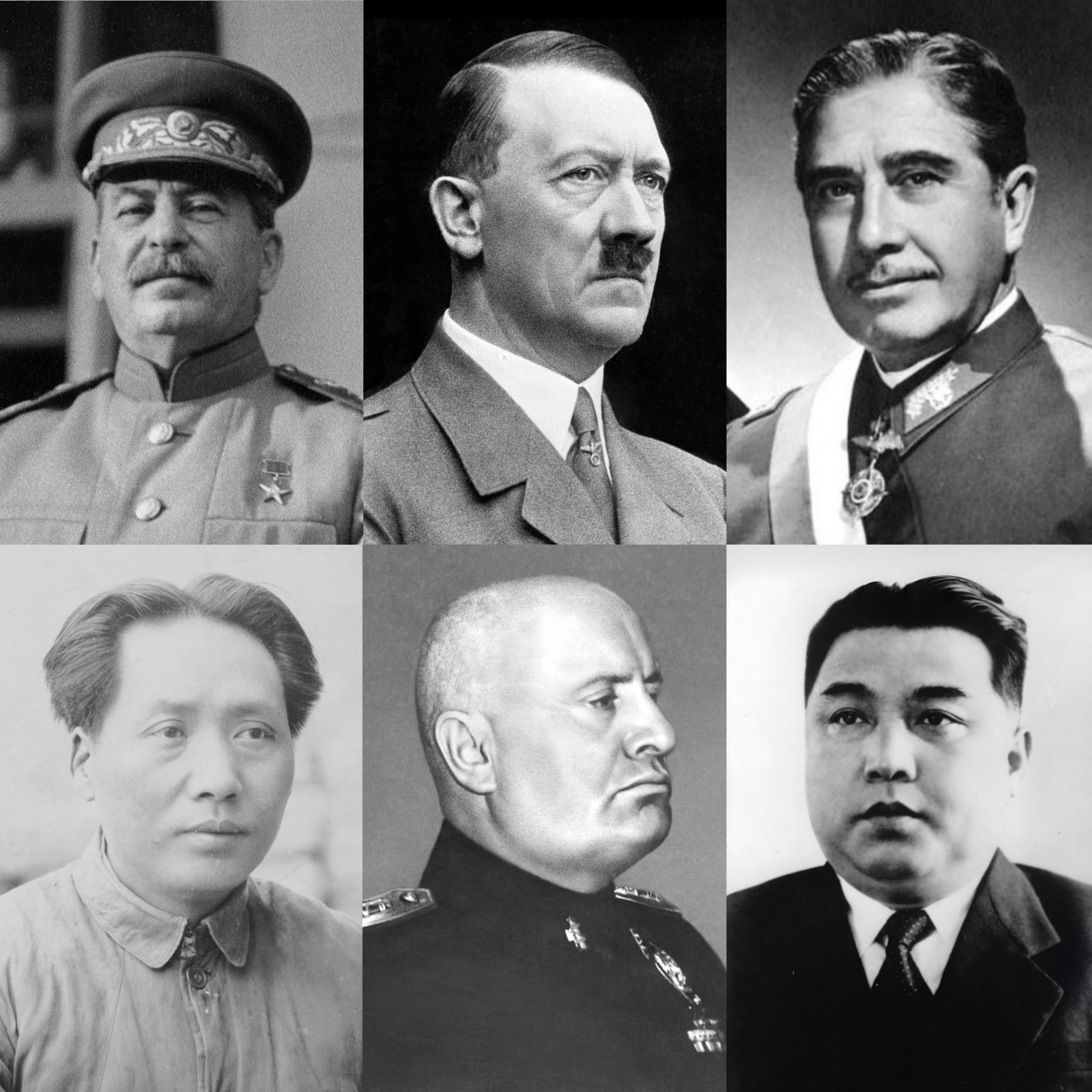
20th-century leaders typically described as dictators (from left to right and top to bottom): Joseph Stalin of the Soviet Union; Adolf Hitler of Germany; Augusto Pinochet of Chile; Mao Zedong of China; Benito Mussolini of Italy; and Kim Il Sung of North Korea

A dictator is a political leader who possesses absolute power. A dictatorship is defined as a state ruled by a dictator. The word originated as the title of a Roman dictator elected by the Roman Senate to rule the republic in times of emergency. Like the terms "tyrant" and "autocrat", dictator came to be used almost exclusively as a non-titular term for oppressive rule. In modern usage, the term dictator is generally used to describe a leader who holds or abuses an extraordinary amount of personal power.

Dictatorships are often characterised by some of the following: suspension of elections and civil liberties; proclamation of a state of emergency; rule by decree; repression of political opponents; not abiding by the procedures of the rule of law; and the existence of a cult of personality centered on the leader. Dictatorships are often one-party or dominant-party states. A wide variety of leaders throughout history have been described as dictators.

== Etymology ==
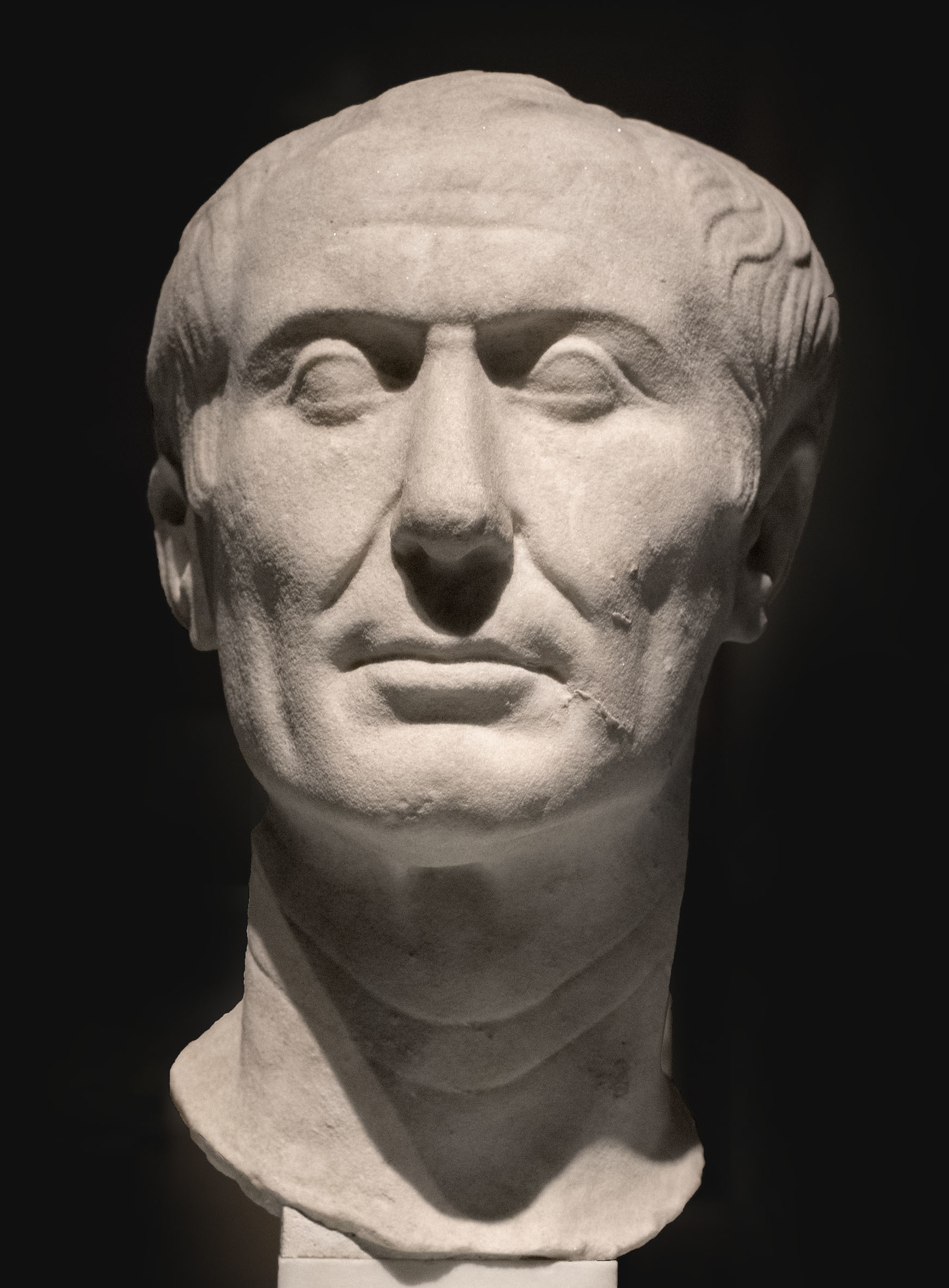
Julius Caesar outmaneuvered his opponents in ancient Rome to install himself as dictator for life.

The word dictator comes from the Latin word dictātor, agent noun from dictare (say repeatedly, assert, order). A dictator was a Roman magistrate given sole power for a limited duration. Originally an emergency legal appointment in the Roman Republic and the Etruscan culture, the term dictator did not have the negative meaning it has now. It started to get its modern negative meaning with Cornelius Sulla's ascension to the dictatorship following Sulla's civil war, making himself the first Dictator in Rome in more than a century (during which the office was ostensibly abolished) as well as de facto eliminating the time limit and need of senatorial acclamation.

He avoided a major constitutional crisis by resigning the office after about one year, dying a few years later. Julius Caesar followed Sulla's example in 49 BC and in February 44 BC was proclaimed Dictator perpetuo, "Dictator in perpetuity", officially doing away with any limitations on his power, which he kept until his assassination the following month. Following Caesar's assassination, his heir Augustus was offered the title of dictator, but he declined it. Later successors also declined the title of dictator, and usage of the title soon diminished among Roman rulers.

== Modern era ==
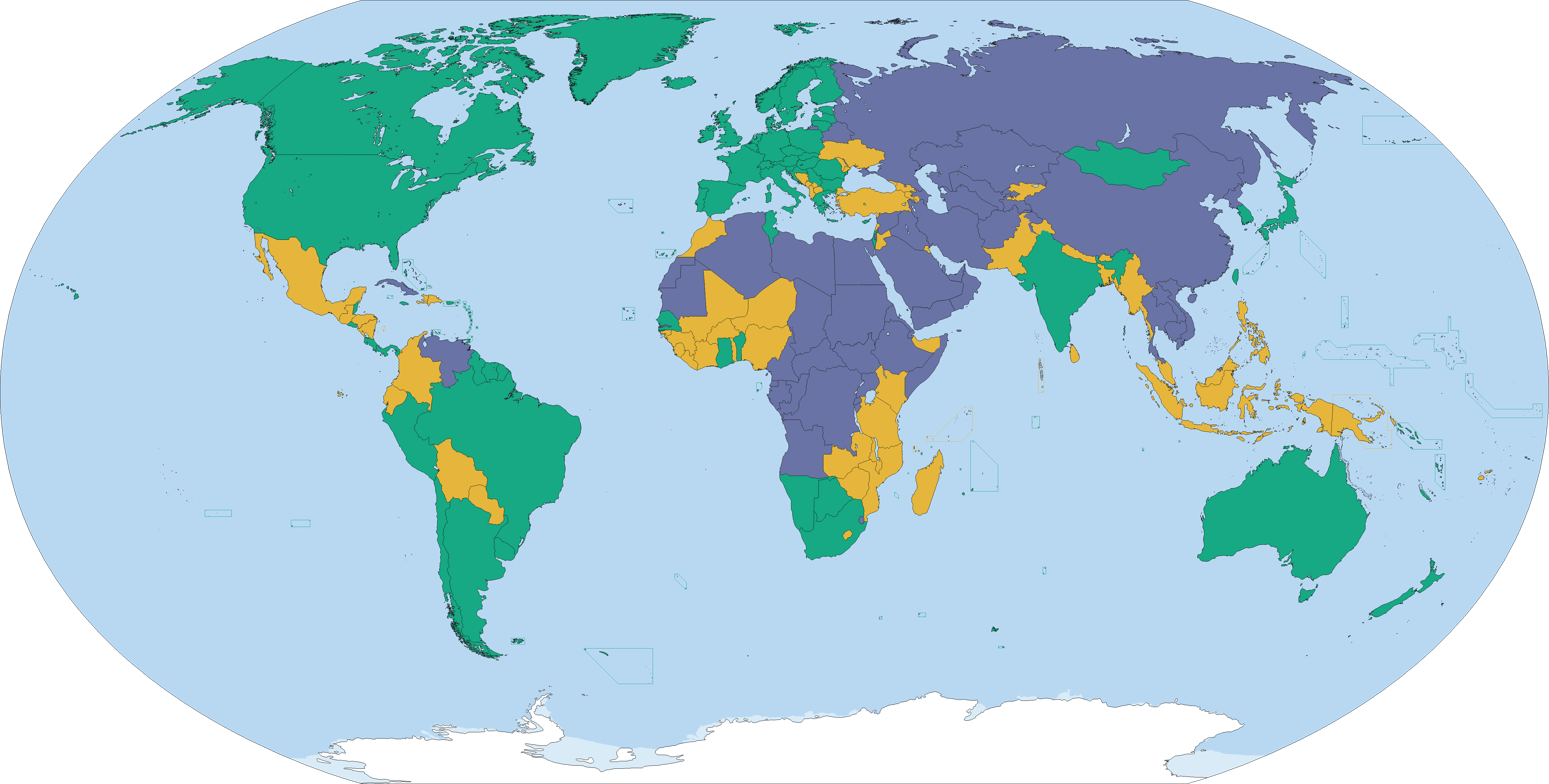
Country ratings for 2016 from Freedom House's Freedom in the World 2017
Free (86) Partly Free (59) Not Free (50)

2017 Democracy Index by The Economist in which countries marked in different shades of red are considered undemocratic, with many being dictatorships

Throughout the 19th century, the term dictator did not carry a pejorative connotation. During the Hungarian Revolution of 1848, the national leader Lajos Kossuth was often referred to as dictator, without any negative connotations, by his supporters and detractors alike, although his official title was that of regent-president. When creating a provisional executive in Sicily during the Expedition of the Thousand in 1860, Giuseppe Garibaldi officially assumed the title of "dictator". Shortly afterwards, during the 1863 January uprising in Poland, "Dictator" was also the official title of four leaders, the first being Ludwik Mierosławski.

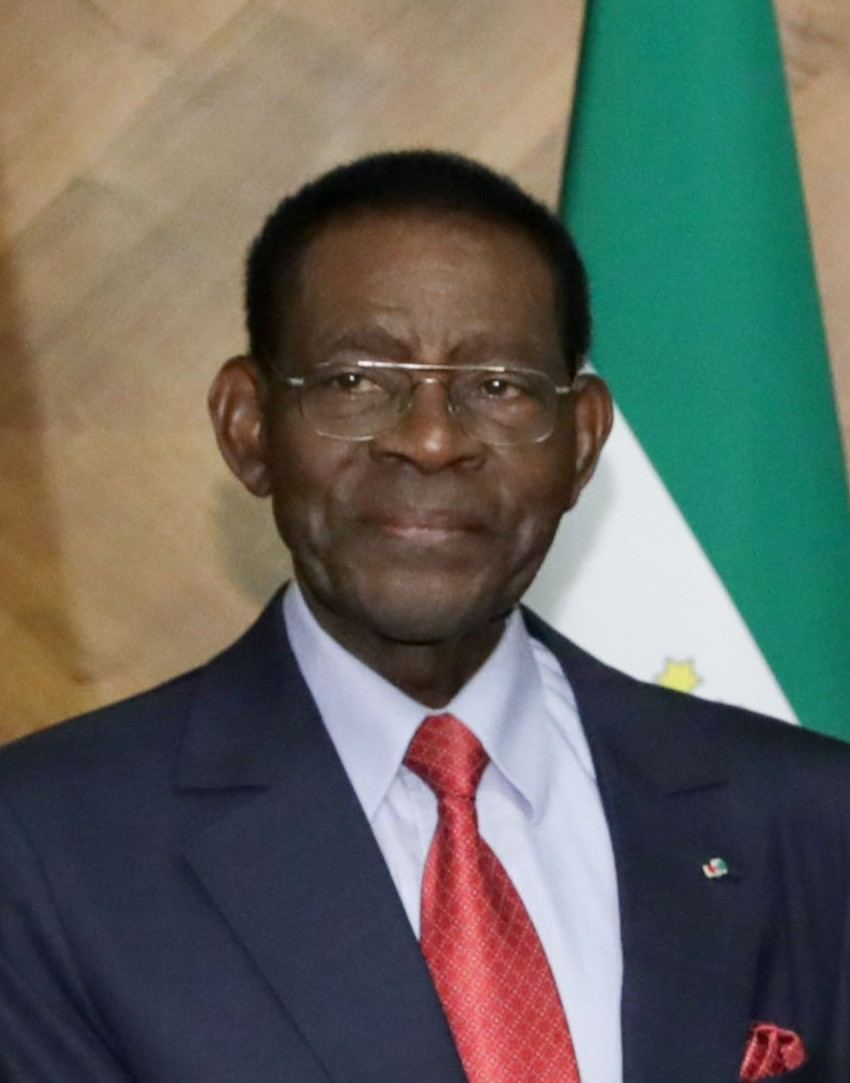
Teodoro Obiang Nguema Mbasogo of Equatorial Guinea, having served since 1979, is the longest-serving living dictator.

Past that time, however, the term dictator assumed an invariably negative connotation. In popular usage, a dictatorship is often associated with brutality and oppression. As a result, it is often also used as a term of abuse against political opponents. Many dictators create a cult of personality around themselves and they have also come to grant themselves increasingly grandiloquent titles and honours. For instance, Idi Amin, who had served in the King's African Rifles prior to Ugandan independence from Britain in 1962, subsequently styled himself "His Excellency, President for Life, Field Marshal Al Hadji Doctor^{[A]} Idi Amin Dada, VC,^{[B]} DSO, MC, Conqueror of the British Empire in Africa in General and Uganda in Particular". In the movie The Great Dictator (1940), Charlie Chaplin satirized not only Adolf Hitler but the institution of dictatorship itself.

=== Characteristics ===
Dictators usually maintain power through political repression of any opposition and the consolidation of other influential or powerful members of society. The general public is controlled through indoctrination and propaganda, and an autocracy may attempt to legitimize itself in the eyes of the public through appeals to political ideology, religion, or foreign hostility. Some dictatorships establish legislatures, unfair elections, or show trials to further exercise control while presenting the appearance of democracy.

==== Benevolent dictatorship ====
A benevolent dictatorship is a concept that describes a government in which an authoritarian leader exercises absolute political power over the state but is perceived to do so with regard for the benefit of the population as a whole, standing in contrast to the decidedly malevolent stereotype of a dictator. The label has been applied to leaders such as Mustafa Kemal Atatürk of Turkey (1923–1938), Josip Broz Tito of SFR Yugoslavia (1953–1980), and Lee Kuan Yew of Singapore (1959–1990).

==== Military roles ====
The association between a dictator and the military is a common one. Many dictators take great pains to emphasize their connections with the military and they often wear military uniforms. In some cases, this is perfectly legitimate; for instance, Francisco Franco was a general in the Spanish Army before he became Chief of State of Spain, and Manuel Noriega was officially commander of the Panamanian Defense Forces.

==== Control of the media ====
Political spin doctoring and heavy reliance on information control instead of overt violence is a common feature among modern autocracies.

==== Titles of dictators ====
Mussolini and Hitler used similar titles referring to them as "the Leader". Mussolini used "Il Duce" and Hitler was generally referred to as "der Führer", both meaning 'Leader' in Italian and German respectively. Franco used a similar title, "El Caudillo" ("the Head", 'the chieftain'). In the case of Franco, the title "Caudillo" did have a longer history for political-military figures in both Latin America and Spain. Franco also used the phrase "By the Grace of God" on coinage or other material displaying him as Caudillo.

==== Human rights abuses, war crimes and genocides ====
Over time, dictators have been known to use tactics that violate human rights. For example, under the Soviet dictator Joseph Stalin, government policy was enforced by secret police and the Gulag system of prison labour camps. Most Gulag inmates were not political prisoners, although significant numbers of political prisoners could be found in the camps at any one time. Data collected from Soviet archives gives the death toll from Gulags as 1,053,829. The International Criminal Court issued an arrest warrant for Sudan's military dictator Omar al-Bashir over alleged war crimes in Darfur.

Similar crimes were committed during Chairman Mao Zedong's rule over the People's Republic of China during China's Cultural Revolution, where Mao set out to purge dissidents, primarily through the use of youth groups (Red Guards) strongly committed to his cult of personality, and during Augusto Pinochet's junta in Chile. Some dictators have been associated with genocide on certain races or groups; the most notable and wide-reaching example is the Holocaust, Adolf Hitler's genocide of eleven million people, of whom six million were Jews. Later on in Democratic Kampuchea, General Secretary Pol Pot and his policies killed an estimated 1.7 million people (out of a population of 7 million) during his four-year dictatorship. As a result, Pol Pot is sometimes described as "the Hitler of Cambodia" and "a genocidal tyrant". In Ba'athist Iraq, Saddam Hussein launched the Anfal campaign against the Kurdish population. Although primarily targeting Kurds, other non-Arabs also fell victim to the Anfal campaign. Due to this, Saddam is often nicknamed "The Hitler of the Middle East".

=== Usage in formal titles ===
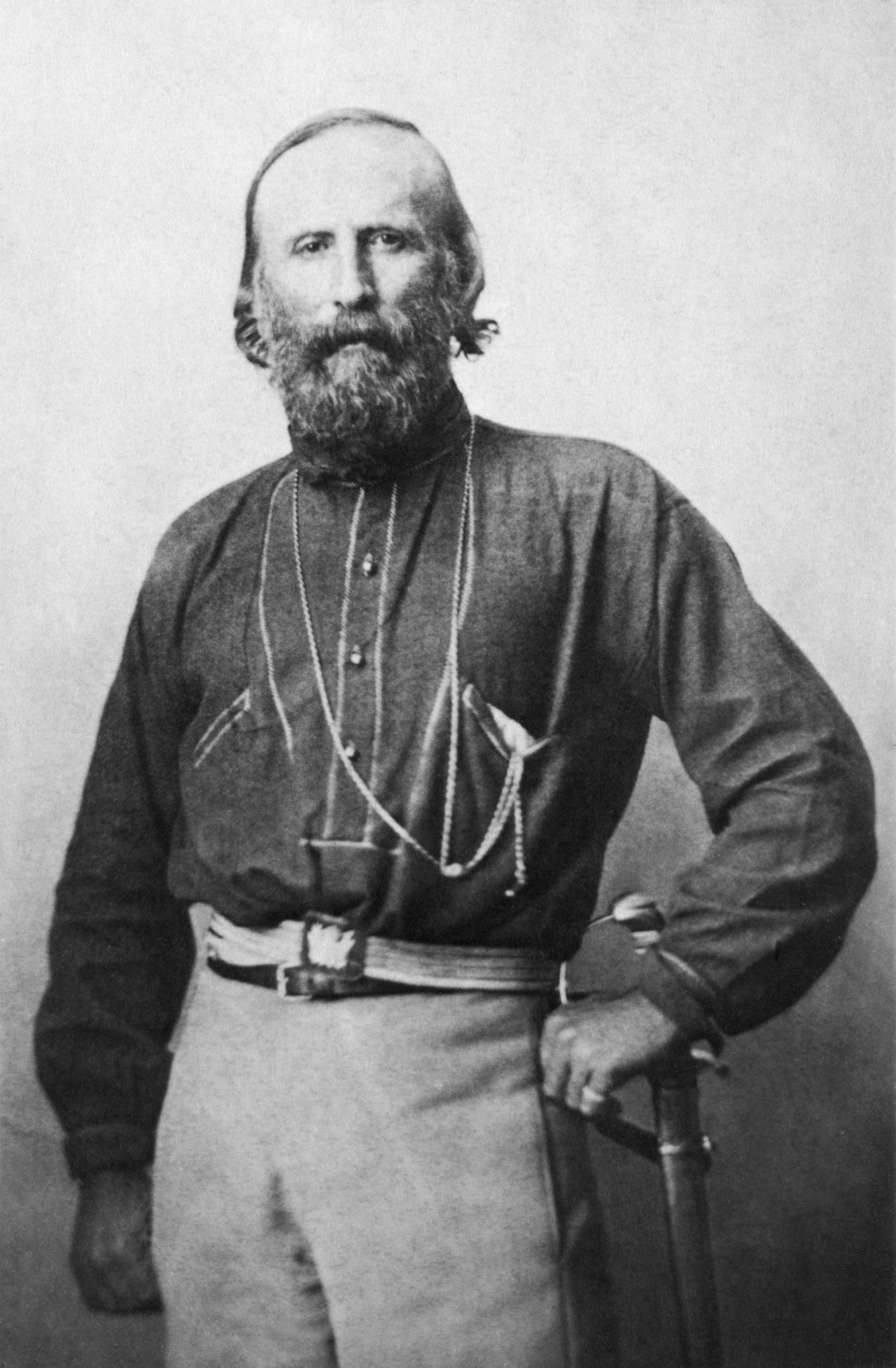
Giuseppe Garibaldi, celebrated as one of the greatest generals of modern times and as the "Hero of the Two Worlds" because of his military enterprises in South America and Europe, who fought in many military campaigns that led to Italian unification. He proclaimed himself dictator of Sicily in 1860 during the Expedition of the Thousand

Because of its negative and pejorative connotations, modern authoritarian leaders very rarely (if ever) use the term dictator in their formal titles, instead they most often simply have title of president. In the 19th century, however, its official usage was more common:

- The Dictatorial Government of Sicily (27 May – 4 November 1860) was a provisional executive government appointed by Giuseppe Garibaldi to rule Sicily during the Expedition of the Thousand. The government ended when Sicily's annexation into the Kingdom of Italy was ratified by plebiscite.
- Marian Langiewicz of Poland proclaimed himself Dictator and attempted (unsuccessfully) to form a Polish government in March 1863.
- Romuald Traugutt was Dictator of Poland from 17 October 1863 to 10 April 1864.
- The Dictatorial Government of the Philippines (24 May – 23 June 1898) was an insurgent government in the Philippines which was headed by Emilio Aguinaldo, who formally held the title of Dictator. The dictatorial government was superseded by the revolutionary government with Aguinaldo as president.

==== As a term of abuse ====
In modern times the word dictator is often applied to leaders who engage in or promote antidemocratic policies, or attempt to establish a repressive regime by force. In the 21st century, the heads of various countries that have undergone democratic backsliding have been referred to as dictators.

The usage of the term dictator in western media has been criticized by the left-leaning organization Fairness & Accuracy in Reporting as "Code for Government We Don't Like". According to them, leaders that would generally be considered authoritarian but are allied with the United States such as Paul Biya or Nursultan Nazarbayev are rarely referred to as "dictators", while leaders of countries opposed to U.S. policy such as Nicolás Maduro or Bashar al-Assad have the term applied to them much more liberally.

== See also ==
- Absolute monarchy
- Authoritarianism
- Benevolent dictator
- Dictator novel
- Dictatorship of the proletariat
- Absolutism and Enlightened absolutism
- Emergency powers
- Greek junta
- Strongman (politics)
- Supreme Leader (disambiguation)
- Totalitarianism
