= Francesco Domenico Guerrazzi =

Italian writer and politician (1804–1873)

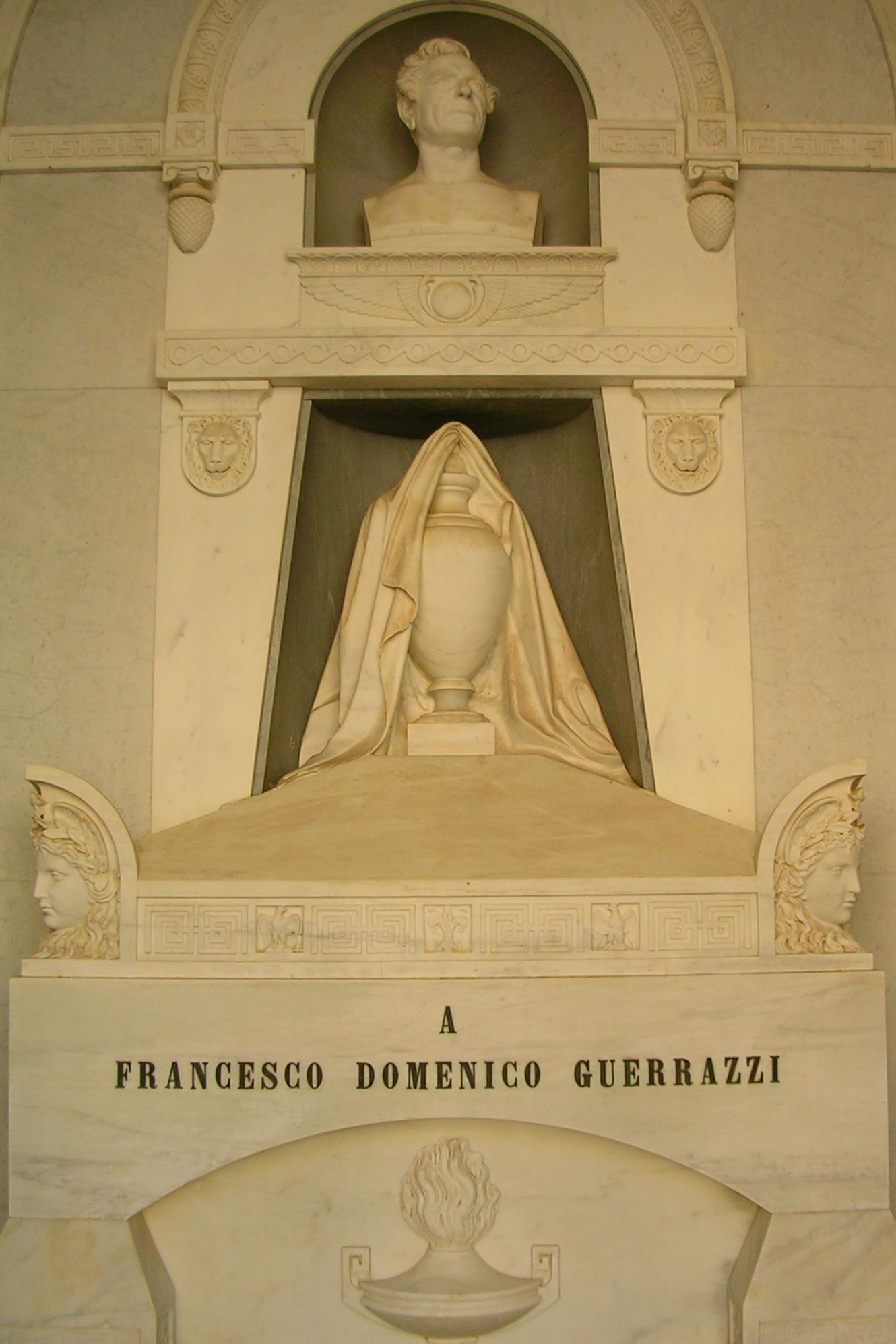
Tomb of Francesco Domenico Guerrazzi

Francesco Domenico Guerrazzi (12 August 1804 – 25 September 1873) was an Italian writer and politician involved in the Italian Risorgimento.

== Biography ==
Guerrazzi was born in the seaport of Livorno, then part of the Grand Duchy of Tuscany. He studied law at the University of Pisa, graduating in 1824. He began to practice in Livorno, but soon gave up law in favour of politics and literature, being particularly influenced by Byron, to whom he dedicated his "Stanze" (1825). His first novel, La Battaglia di Benevento was published in 1827.

Giuseppe Mazzini made his acquaintance, and in 1829, together with Carlo Bini, they started a newspaper, L'Indicatore Livornese, at Livorno. The authorities of the Grand Duchy of Tuscany suppressed the periodical in February 1830 after 48 issues.

In the same year Guerrazzi was banished to Montepulciano for six months after writing an oration to the memory of Cosimo Del Fante — a native of Livorno who had embraced the ideals of the French Revolution and whom Guerrazzi held up as an example for the idealists of the Risorgimento. While confined to Montepulciano he began work on his most famous novel, L'Assedio di Firenze - based on and greatly glorifying the life of the 16th Century Florentine soldier Francesco Ferruccio. The novel contains long discursive passages, anti-clerical outbursts, and a measure of black humour and satanism in the Byronic manner. Further historical novels, such as Veronica Cybo (1838), Isabella Orsini (1844), Beatrice Cenci (1853), and Pasquale Paoli (1860), attempt to make the portrayals of their protagonists both realistic and romantic. But Guerrazzi is at his best as a humourist and fantasist, as in Serpicina (1847), Storia di un moscone (1858), and the autobiographical Il buco nero (1862).

Guerrazzi was to be imprisoned several times for his activity in the cause of "Young Italy"; in 1833 he was locked up for three months in the Forte Stella at Portoferraio.

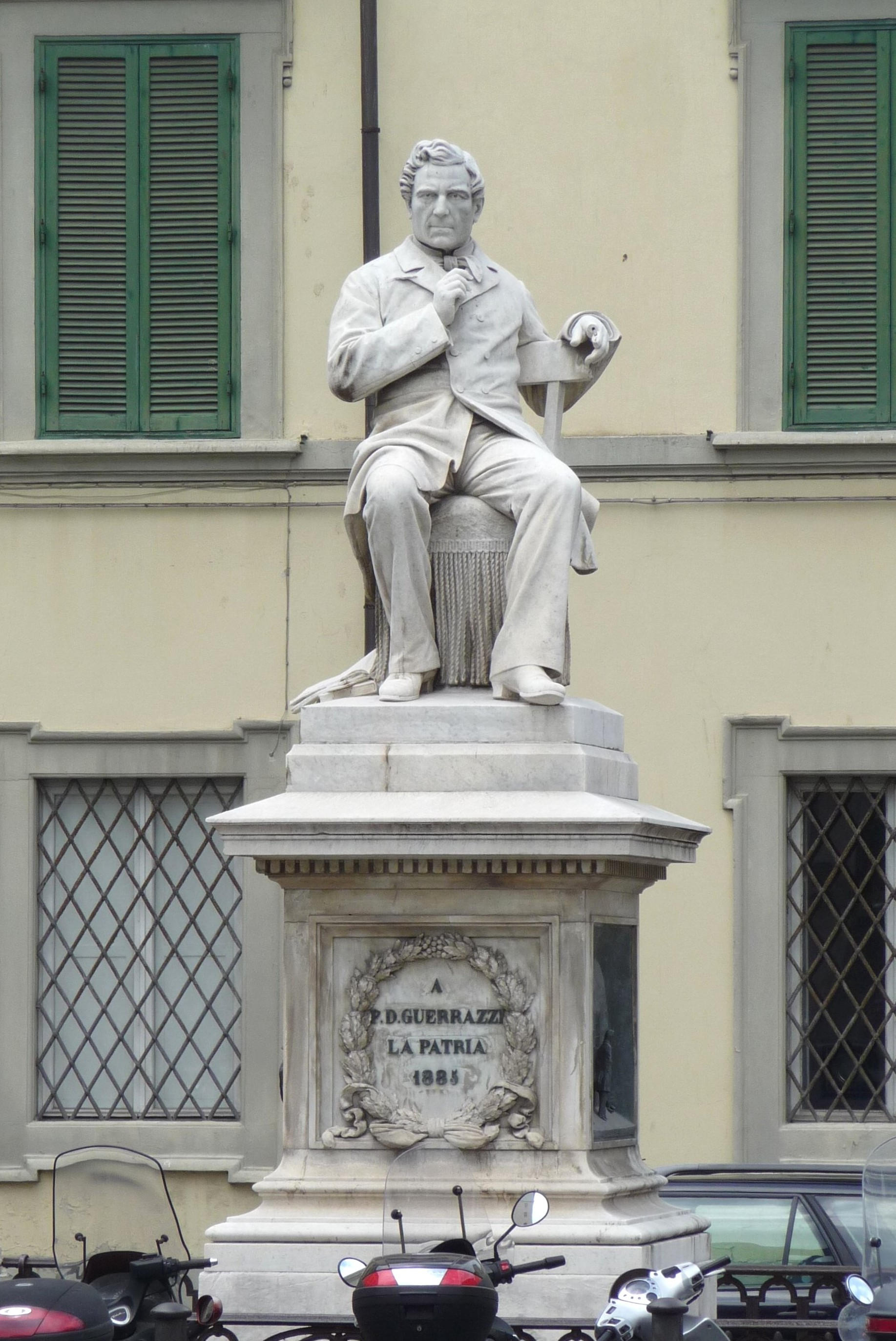
Monument in piazza Guerazzi, Livorno.

Subsequently, he became the most powerful Liberal leader at Livorno. In 1848 Guerrazzi was appointed a minister, with some idea of mediating between the reformers and the grand duke of Tuscany, Leopold II. On 8 February 1849, following Leopold's flight, Guerrazzi formed a governing triumvirate with Giuseppe Mazzoni and Giuseppe Montanelli and a Tuscan Republic was proclaimed; on 27 March Guerrazzi was nominated dictator.

On Leopold's restoration, Guerrazzi refused to flee and he was sentenced to 15 years of imprisonment. In these years he worked on his Apologia, which was published in 1852. After three years in prison his sentence was commuted to exile in Corsica; in 1857 he escaped from the island and lived for some time in Genoa. In 1860 he was elected to Italian Parliament, supporting the republican right until he retired in 1870.

He continued to produce fiction in his later years, including L'assedio di Roma (1863–5), as well as writing on politics and translating from English and German literature. Guerrazzi died of a stroke in Cecina some 30 km from his birthplace, Livorno.

== Criticisms ==
When in 1854 Beatrice Cenci was lambasted by Francesco de Sanctis (who now favored the House of Savoy leadership for Italy), he wrote to a friend: "Honoured Alessandro Manzoni, I am put down... to think that as far back as '40 Britons and Germans saw us as leaders of two different schools, and his they labelled sleep-inducing".

Marxist philosopher Antonio Gramsci panned Guerrazzi's patriotical works. In one of his prison letters Gramsci refers to Guerrazzi and Bresciani as left and right variants of the same bitterly sectarian type of historical novel.
