= Giuseppe Montanelli =

Italian statesman and author (1813–1862)

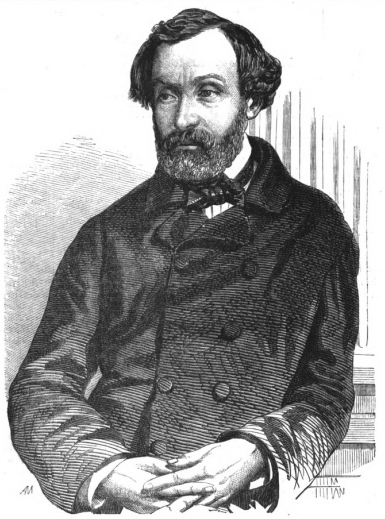
Giuseppe Montanelli

Giuseppe Montanelli (21 January 1813 – 17 June 1862) was an Italian statesman and writer.

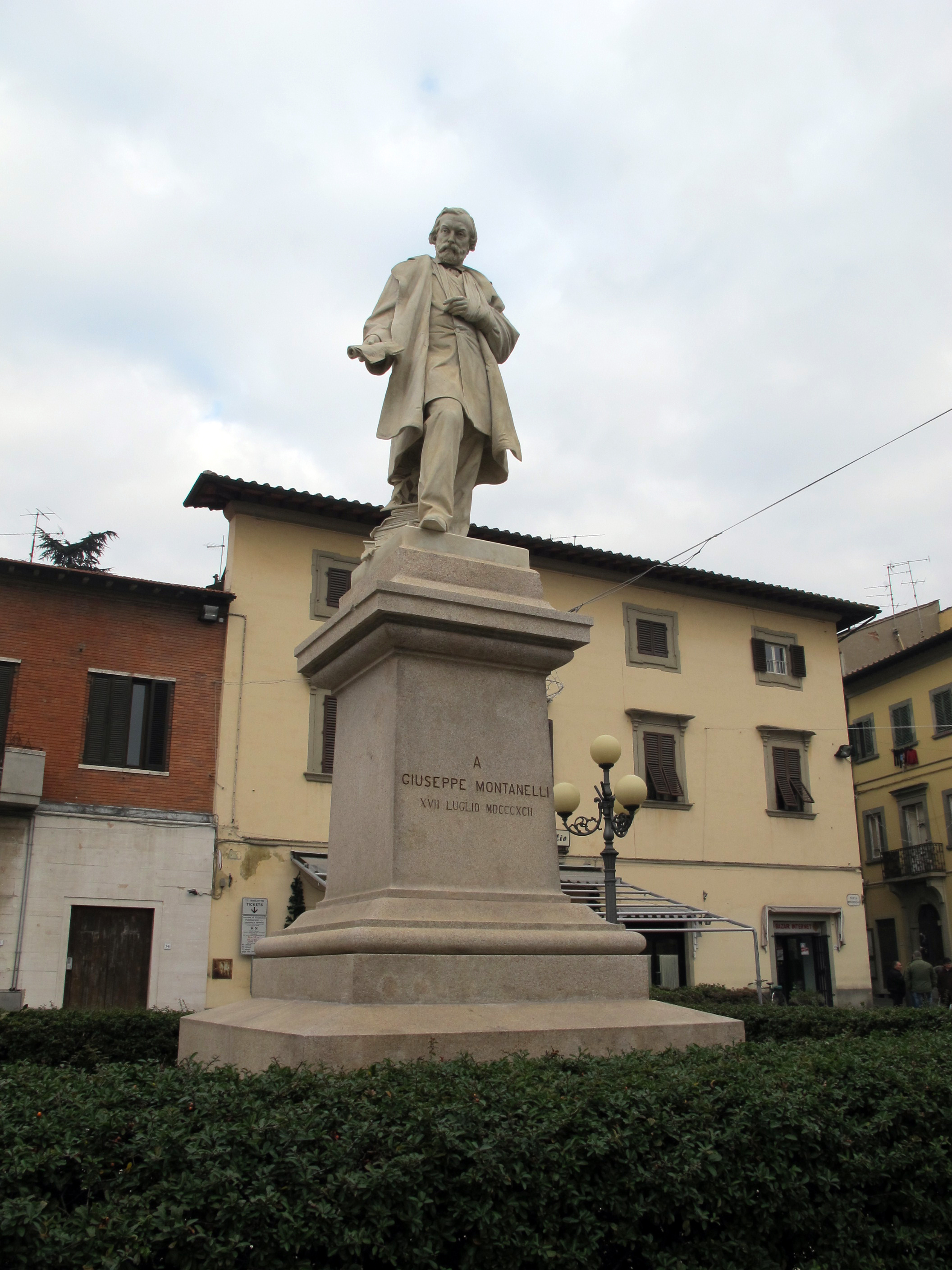
Statue in Fucecchio

== Biography ==
Montanelli was born at Fucecchio, then part of the Grand Duchy of Tuscany. As a boy he was an organist and composer. In 1840, he was appointed law professor at Pisa after graduating law school when he was 18. He contributed to the Antologia, a celebrated Florentine review, and in 1847 founded a newspaper called L'Italia, the programme of which was "Reform and Nationality". In 1848, Montanelli served with the Tuscan student volunteers at the battle of Curtatone, where he was wounded and taken prisoner by the Austrians.

After being liberated, Montanelli returned to Tuscany, and the grand duke Leopold II, knowing that he was popular with the masses, sent him to Livorno to quell the disturbances. In October, Leopold, much against his inclinations, asked him to form a ministry. He accepted, and on January 10, 1849, induced the grand duke to establish a national constituent assembly. But Leopold, alarmed at the turn affairs were taking, fled from Florence, and Montanelli, Guerrazzi and Mazzini were elected "triumvirs" of Tuscany. Like Mazzini, Montanelli advocated the union of Tuscany with Rome.

After the restoration of the grand duke, Montanelli, who was in exile in Paris, was tried and condemned by default; he remained some years in France, where he became a partizan of Napoleon III. It was during this time that he was recruited to assist Giuseppe Verdi with the libretto of his 1857 opera which became Simon Boccanegra, and this collaboration continued after Verdi left Paris to return to Italy.

On the formation of the Kingdom of Italy, he returned to Tuscany and was elected a member of parliament. Montanelli died at Fucecchio in 1862. Although it has been reported that Indro Montanelli, the 20th-century Italian journalist, is the grandson of Montanelli, there is in fact no relation between the two. Montanelli had no children, and the family name was passed down through his sister as Gori-Montanelli.

== Works ==
- Memorie sui l'Italia e specialmente sulla Toscana dat 1814 at 1850 (Turin, 1853–55; translated into French, 2 vols., Paris, 1857)
- Il Partito nazionale italiano (1856)
- L'Impero, il papato, e la democrazia in Italia (1859)
- Dell' ordinamento nazionale in Italia (1862)
- La Tentazione (poem)
- Camma (tragedy written for Adelaide Ristori while she was acting in Paris)

He translated Ernest Legouvé's Médée, also on behalf of Ristori.
