= Mordini =

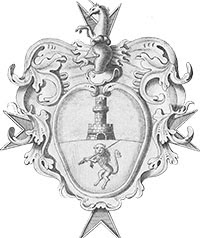
- Current region: Italy

The Mordini are a prominent Florentine noble family that has been involved in the political and social history of Tuscany since the Middle Ages. Originating from Lucca, they appear to have held important posts in Florence in the twelfth century. The first attested coat of arms was used in Pisa and consisted of a red tower, under which a leopard was depicted in the act of biting a golden sword.

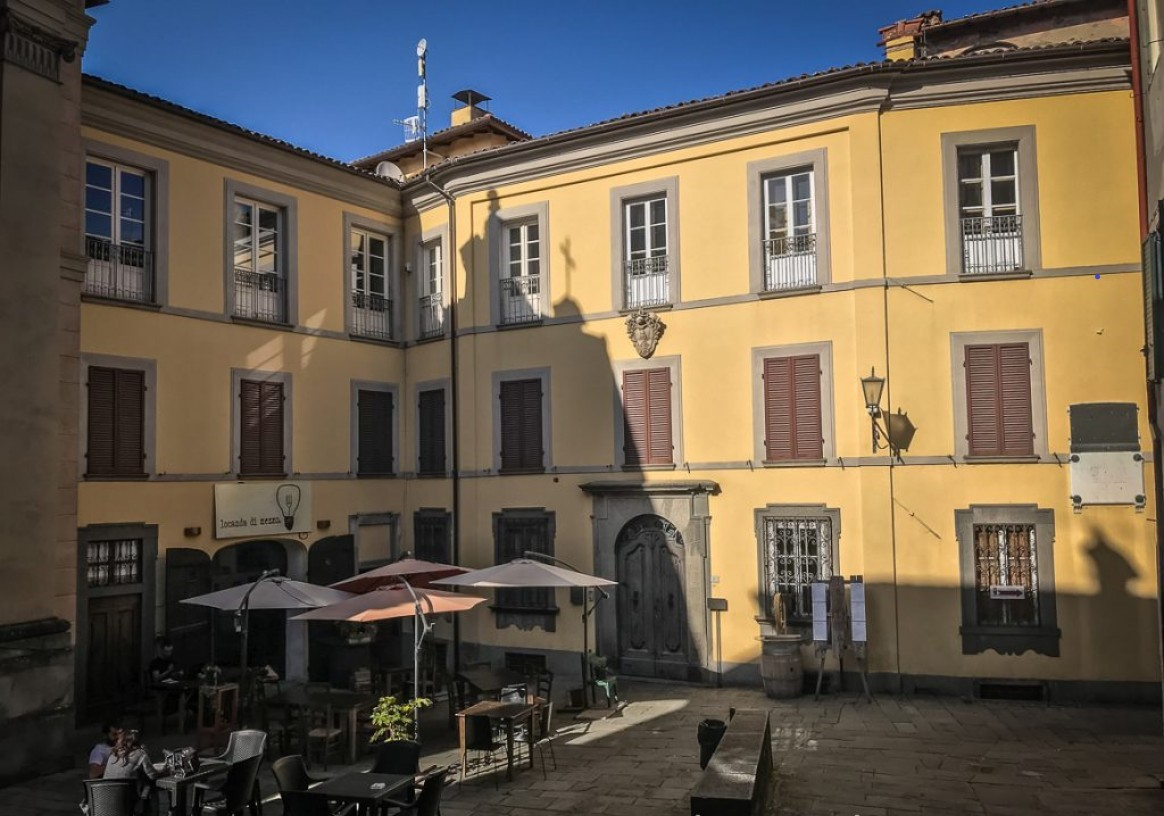

In Barga there is Palazzo Mordini, once the private residence of Senator Antonio Mordini, and today the Museum of the Risorgimento. In Castelfidardo there is another building belonging to the family which was converted into a municipal library.

Senator Antonio Mordini (1819-1902), Minister of Public Works and Senator of the Kingdom of Italy, was very close to Giuseppe Garibaldi. After the Expedition of the Thousand, he was proclaimed a Governor of Sicily and called the Plebiscite of the Sicilian provinces of 1860 which de facto contributed to the merger with the nascent Kingdom of Italy (1861-1946).

Antonio's great-grandson, Alfredo Mordini (Firenzuola, June 29, 1902 - Milan, July 10, 1969) was an Italian political figure and partisan. In April 1937, Mordini enlisted in the Garibaldi Brigades in defense of the Republic in the Spanish Civil War.

After a forced exile in France, Mordini returned to Italy and joined the Italian resistance movement.

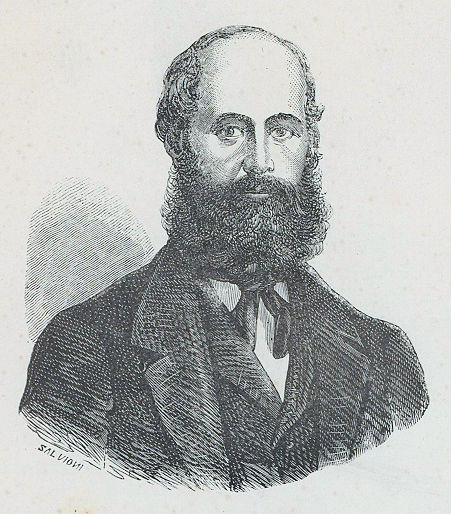
Senator Antonio Mordini, 1852.

The Beretta 1934 pistol, cal. 9 mm., Serial number 778133, used by Aldo Lampredi in the action that led to the death of Benito Mussolini, was delivered by Alfredo Mordini. After the death of Alfredo Mordini, in 1969, his wife delivered the Beretta pistol to his friend Piero Boveri. Since 1983 it has been kept in the Voghera Historical Museum.
