= Giuseppe La Farina =

Italian lawyer, journalist and politician

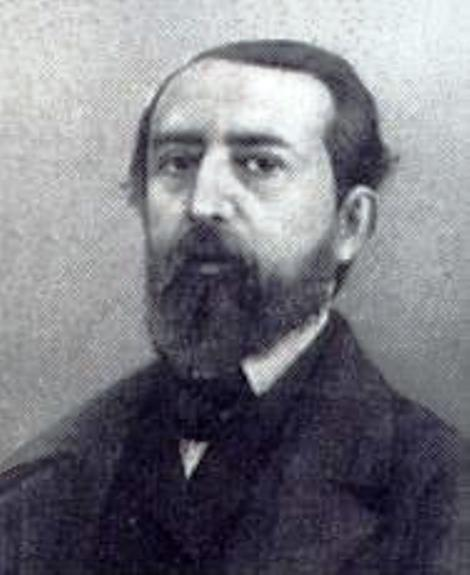
- Born: 20 July 1815; Messina, Italy
- Died: 5 September 1863 (aged 48); Turin, Italy
- Known for: Italian unification leader

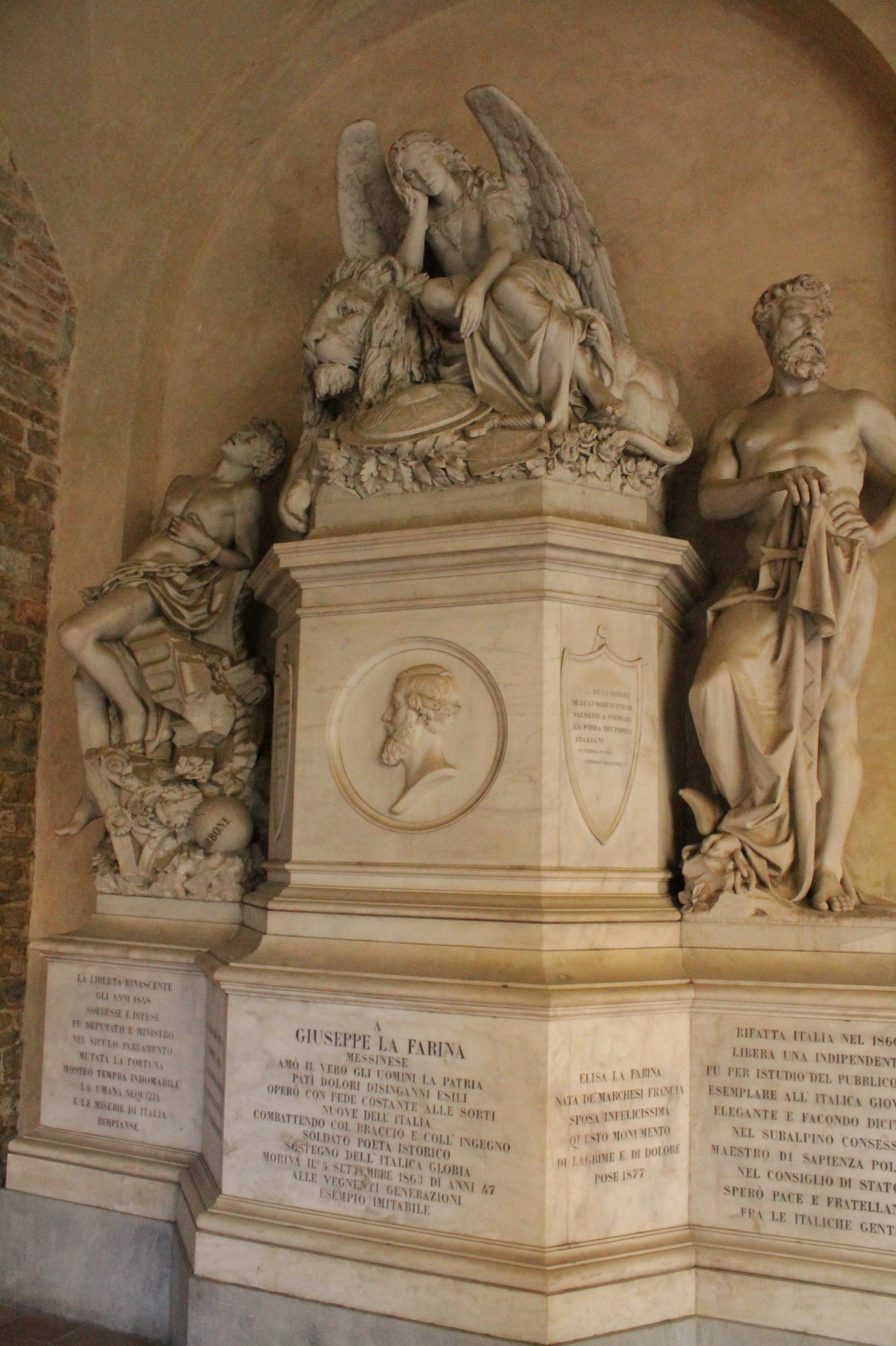
Monument to Giuseppe La Farina, Santa Croce, Florence

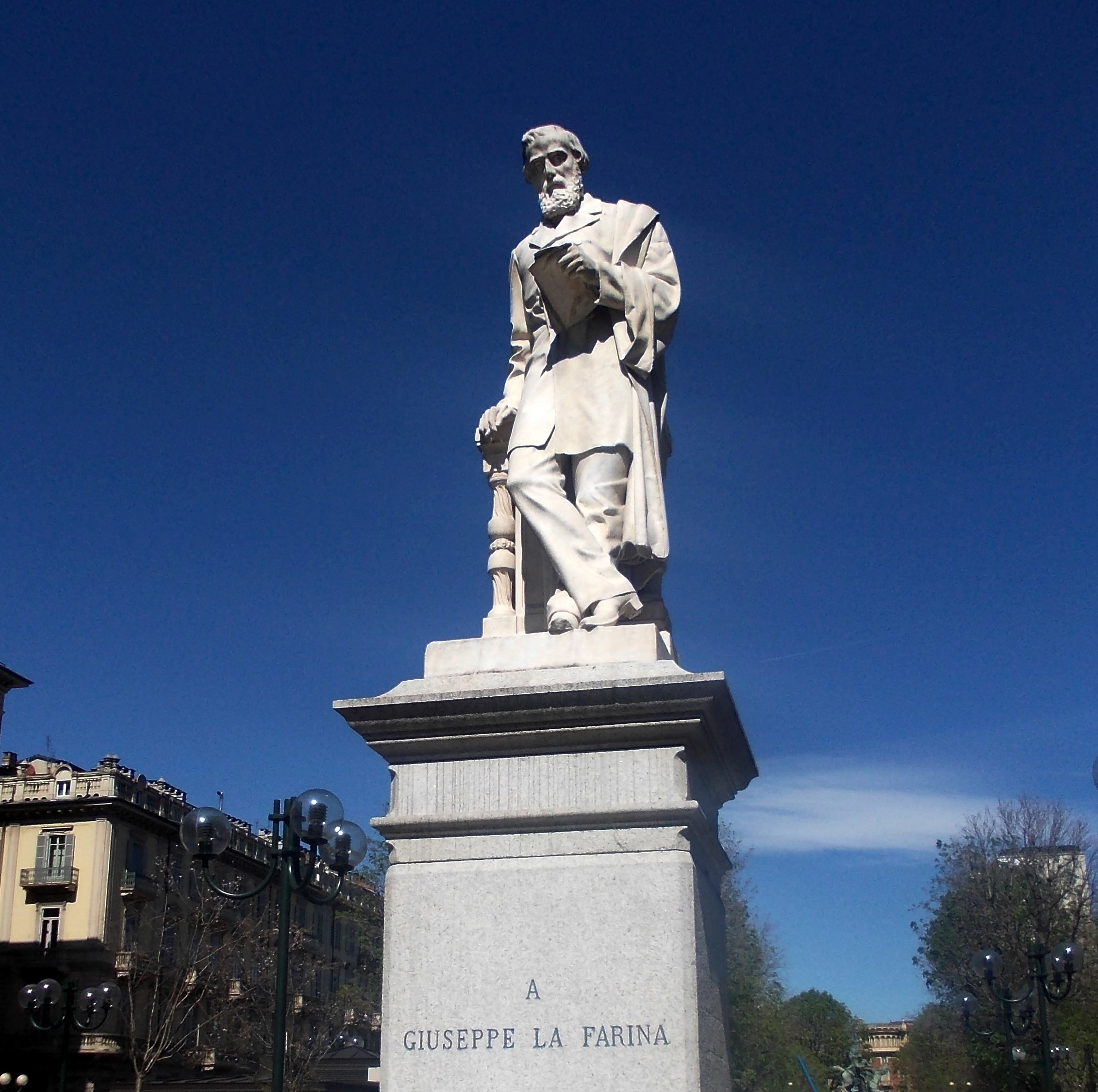
Monument to Giuseppe La Farina, Turin

Giuseppe La Farina (20 July 1815 – 5 September 1863) was an Italian lawyer, journalist and politician. He was an influential leader of the Italian Risorgimento. He was founder of the Italian National Society in 1857, a society dedicated to the unification of Italy.

== Life ==
La Farina was born in Messina in Sicily on 29 July 1815.

Minister of Cavour was highly involved in Garibaldi's departure for Sicily. Ostensibly sent by Cavour to dissuade Garibaldi from going, he in fact did little of the sort. A nationalist at heart, he was believed to be one of the few to whom Cavour actually revealed his intentions regarding the Sicilian campaign during the dictatorship of Garibaldi, and eventual unification.

He died in Turin on 5 September 1863, aged only 47. His ashes were later relocated to his family tomb in Messina.

== Recognition ==
A large monument to his memory stands in the south-west corner of the cloister of the Basilica of Santa Croce, Florence. In Messina, a street (Via Giuseppe La Farina) and a high school are named after him. In 1919, the Italian Navy named a ship after him.
