= Ferdinando Bartolommei =

Marquis Ferdinando Bartolommei (1821 - 15 June 1869) was an Italian revolutionist and statesman who played an important part in the political events of Tuscany from 1848 to 1860.

== Life ==
From the beginning of the revolutionary movement Bartolommei was always an ardent Liberal, and although belonging to an old and noble Florentine family his sympathies were with the democratic party rather than with the moderately liberal aristocracy. In 1847-1848 his house was a center of revolutionary committees, and during the brief constitutional regime he was much to the fore.

After the return of Leopold II, Grand Duke of Tuscany in 1849 under Austrian protection, Bartolommei was present at a requiem service in the church of Santa Croce for those who fell in the late campaign against Austria; on that occasion disorders occurred and he was relegated to his country estate in consequence (1851). Shortly afterwards he was implicated in the distribution of seditious literature and exiled from Tuscany for a year.

Bartolommei settled at Turin for a time and established relations with Cavour and the Piedmontese liberals. He subsequently visited France and England, and like many Italian patriots became enamored of British institutions. He returned to Florence in 1853; from that time onward he devoted himself to the task of promoting the ideas of Italian independence and unity among the people, and although carefully watched by the police, he kept a secret printing-press in his palace in Florence.

Finding that the nobility still hesitated at the idea of uncompromising hostility to the house of Lorraine, he allied himself more firmly with the popular party, and found an able lieutenant in the baker Giuseppe Dolfi (1818–1869), an honest and whole-hearted enthusiast who had great influence with the common people. As soon as war between Piedmont and Austria appeared imminent, Bartolommei organized the expedition of Tuscan volunteers to join the Piedmontese army, spending large sums out of his own pocket for the purpose, and was also president of the Tuscan branch of the Societé Nazionale.

He worked desperately hard conspiring for the overthrow of the grand duke, assisted by all the liberal elements, and on 27 April 1859, Florence rose as one man, the troops refused to fire on the people, and the grand duke departed, never to return. "Sapristii pas un carreau cass" was the comment of the French minister to Tuscany on this bloodless revolution. A provisional government was formed and Bartolommei elected gonfaloniere. He had much opposition to encounter from those who still believed that the retention of the grand duke as a constitutional sovereign and member of an Italian confederation was possible. In the summer elections were held, and on the meeting of parliament Bartolommei's unitarian views prevailed, the assembly voting the resolution that the house of Lorraine had forfeited its rights and that Tuscany must be united to Italy under King Victor Emmanuel. Bartolommei was made senator of the Italian kingdom and received various other honors. His last years were spent in educational and philanthropic work. He died on 15 June 1869, leaving a widow and two daughters.

The best biography of Bartolommei is contained in Il Rivolgimento toscano e l'azione popolare, by his daughter Matilde Gioli (Florence, 1905), but the author attributes perhaps ap undue preponderance to her father in the Tuscan revolution, and is not quite fair towards Bettino Ricasoli and other leaders of the aristocratic party. Cf. Lettere e documenti di B. Ricasoli (Florence, 1887–1896), and D. Zanichelli's Lettere politiche di B. Ricasoli, U. Peruzzi, N. Corsini, e C. Rdolfi (Bologna, 1898).
