= Dictatorship of Giuseppe Garibaldi =

1860 government in the Two Sicilies

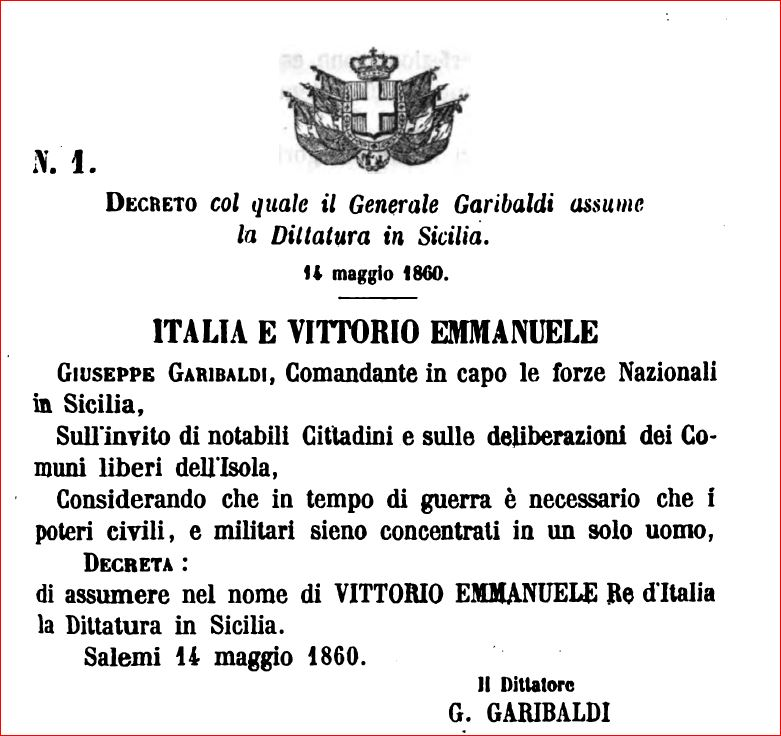
The dictatorial decree

The Dictatorship of Garibaldi or Dictatorial Government of Sicily was the provisional executive that Giuseppe Garibaldi appointed to govern the territory of Sicily during the Expedition of the Thousand in 1860. It governed in opposition to the Bourbons of Naples.

== History ==
On 14 May 1860 in Salemi, Garibaldi announced that he was assuming dictatorship over Sicily, in the name of Victor Emmanuel II of Italy. On 17 May, Francesco Crispi was appointed First Secretary of State.

The Redshirts advanced to Palermo, the capital of the island, and launched a siege on 27 May. On 2 June 1860 in Palermo were appointed four secretaries of State and created six departments. Created the Sicilian Army and a fleet of the government of Sicily.

The pace of Garibaldi's victories had worried Cavour, who in early July sent him a proposal of immediate annexation of Sicily to Piedmont. Garibaldi vehemently refused to allow such a move until the end of the war. Cavour's envoy, Giuseppe La Farina, was arrested and expelled from the island. He was replaced by the more malleable Agostino Depretis, who gained Garibaldi's trust and was appointed as pro-dictator.

The dictatorial government ended 2 December 1860, while November, 4, the annexation of the Kingdom of Italy was ratified by the popular plebiscite of 21 October.

From 2 December 1860 to 5 January 1862 the dictatorship was followed by the "General Lieutenancy of the king for Sicily".

== First Secretary of State ==
- Francesco Crispi (17 May – 18 July 1860)
- Giuseppe Sirtori (18 – 22 July 1860), pro-dictator
- Agostino Depretis (22 July – 14 September 1860), pro-dictator
- Antonio Mordini (17 September – 2 December 1860), pro-dictator

== See also ==
- Expedition of the Thousand
- Kingdom of the Two Sicilies
- Kingdom of Sicily
- Sicilian revolution of 1848

== Sources ==
- Abba, Giuseppe Cesare (1880). Da Quarto al Volturno. Noterelle di uno dei Mille.
- Mack Smith, Denis (1990). Italy and Its Monarchy.
