= Francesco Zambeccari =

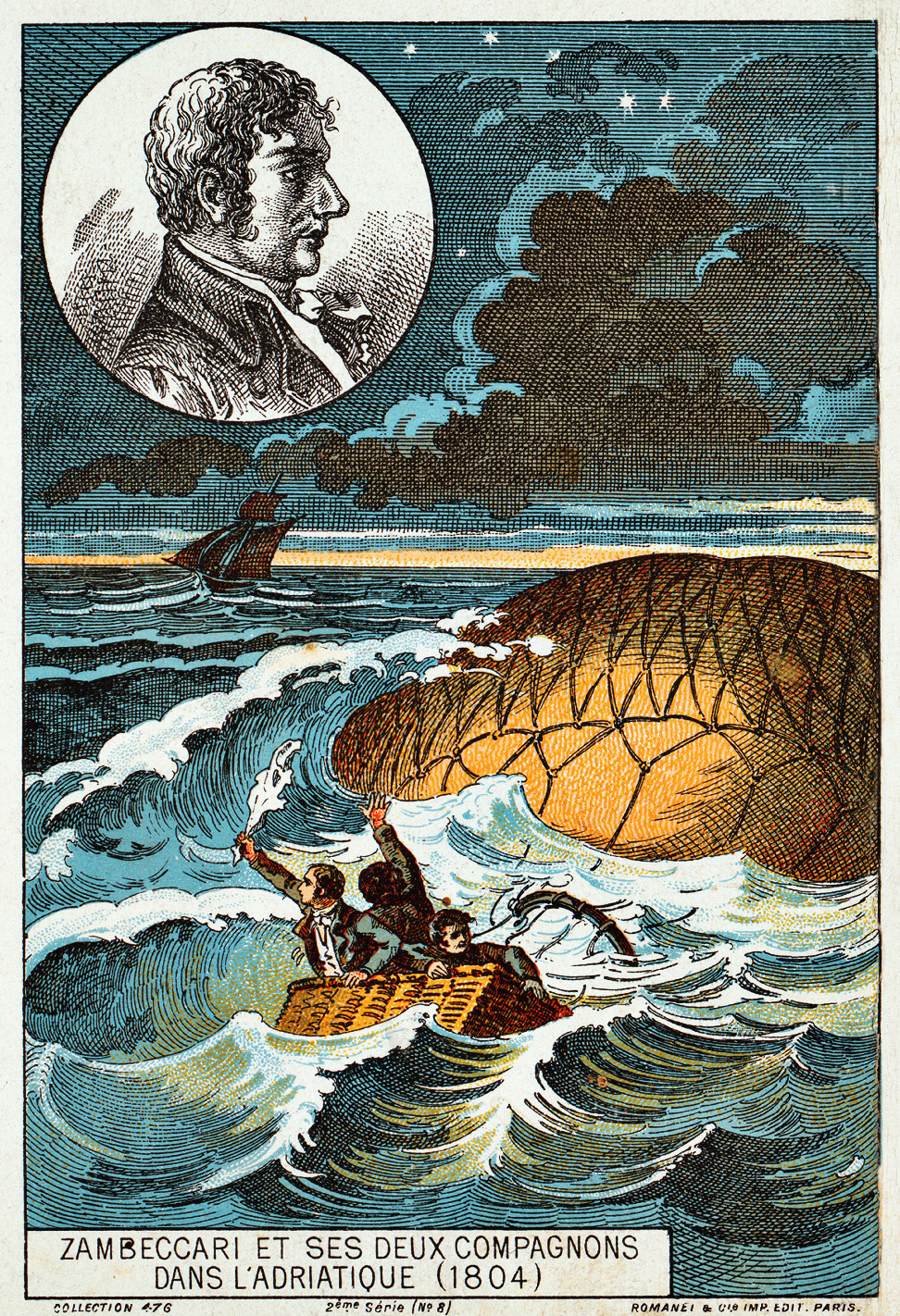
Zambeccari and his two companions in the Adriatic (1804), early flight collecting card, ca. 1895

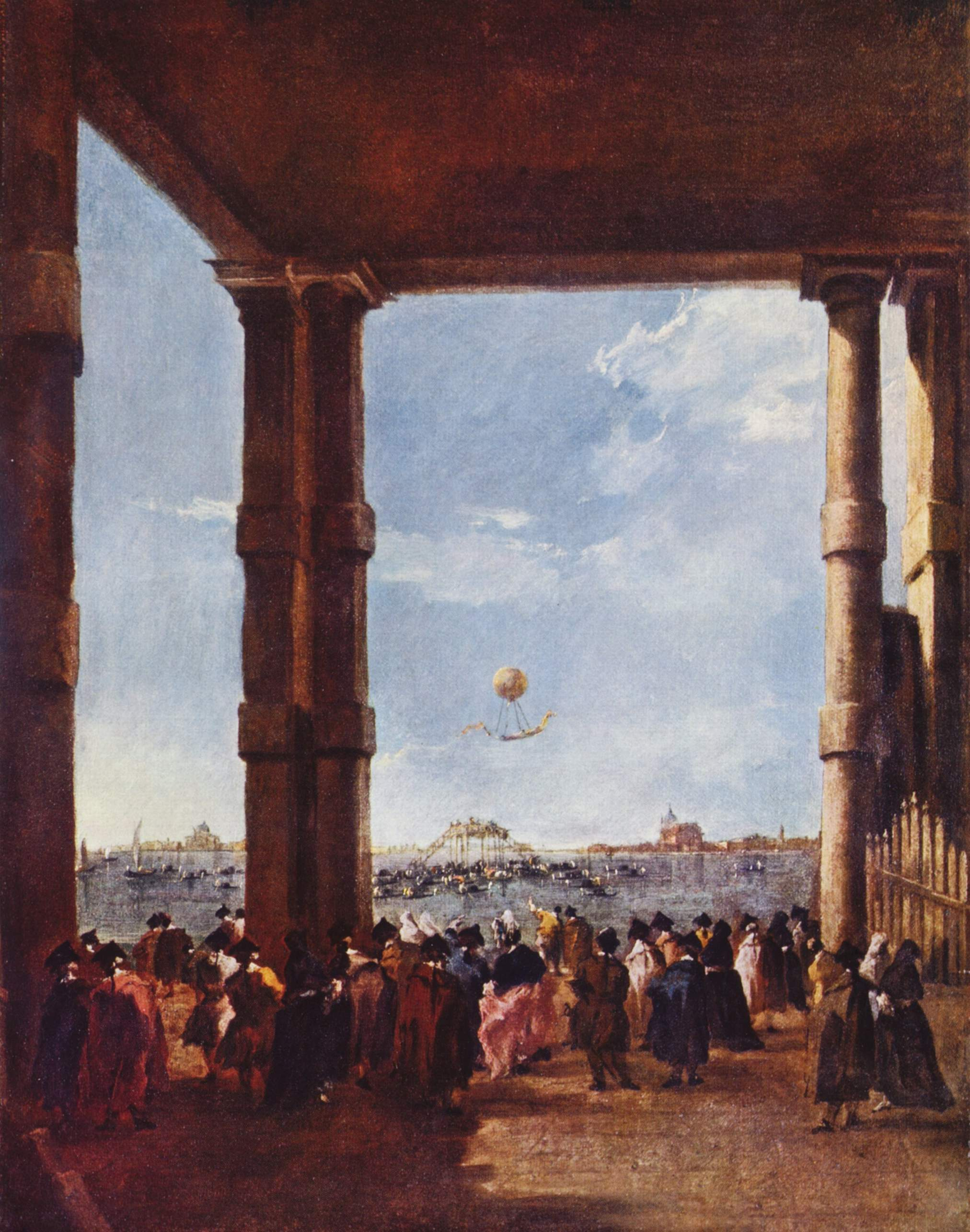
Francesco Guardi, Ascent of a Balloon in Venice, 1784

Count Francesco Zambeccari (1752 – 21 September 1812) was an Italian aviation pioneer. He was killed in a ballooning accident.

Zambeccari was born in Bologna in 1752, son of Senator Giacomo Zambeccari. He studied at the Collegio dei nobili in Parma and then enlisted in the Guardia Real in Spain and served in the Spanish Navy. He fled from the Spanish Inquisition, and was in Paris in 1783 where he observed the first unmanned balloon flights by the Montgolfier brothers.

He then moved to London and launched the first unmanned balloon in Britain on 4 November 1783, a year before the first manned flight in England by Vincent Lunardi, releasing a 5 feet (1.5 m) hydrogen balloon from the house of Michael Biaggini, a maker of artificial flowers made from silk and other fabrics, at 33 Noble Street, on Cheapside. The balloon was later found by a farmer at Waltham Abbey. The experiment was repeated a few weeks later, as a commercial enterprise for which Zambeccari and Biaggini sold tickets, with a release of a 10 feet (3.0 m) balloon from the grounds of the Honourable Artillery Company on 25 November; this balloon was found nearly 40 miles (64 km) away at Petworth. Biaggini released an even larger 16 feet (4.9 m) balloon from Grosvenor Square in January 1784. Zambeccari was commissioned to launch a balloon in Venice in April 1784, an occasion that was painted by Francesco Guardi. He also collaborated with Vincent Lunardi before Lunardi's first manned flight in England on 15 September 1784. Zambeccari and Admiral Sir Edward Vernon ascended in a 34 feet (10 m) balloon from Tottenham Court Road on 23 March 1785 and landed later the same day near Horsham. The balloon was later displayed at the Lyceum. He also flew from Norwich later that year.

Zambeccari moved to St Petersburg in 1787 and served in the Russian Imperial Navy. He was captured by the Turks in 1787 and held prisoner in Constantinople for over two years. His freedom was secured by the Spanish ambassador.

He returned to Bologna, and married Diamante Negrini. They had three children, including Livio Zambeccari.

He spent the rest of his life experimenting with balloons, generally using a combination of a hot air balloon and hydrogen balloon known as a rozière after Jean-François Pilâtre de Rozier. He sought a method of steering using rudders or oars. He published a five-volume work on ballooning in London in 1803.

He and his companions were rescued from the Adriatic Sea, twice, in 1803 and 1804. The government of Bologna sponsored a flight in 1803. Bad weather caused the flight to be postponed in September 1803. Wanting to avoid a second postponement, the balloon took off in bad weather on 7 October. Zambeccari was accompanied by Pasquale Andreoli and Gaetano Grassetti. In bad visibility, the balloon crashed into the Adriatic Sea early the following morning. Similarly, another flight with Andreoli on 23 August 1804 also crashed into the Adriatic Sea.

Zambeccari died in September 1812, when his balloon caught fire after an unsuccessful landing attempt. His companion, Bonaga, survived. He was buried in the family tomb in the Basilica of San Francesco. His remains were moved to the Certosa di Bologna in 1813, but returned to San Francesco in 1926 to be interred with his son Livio in the monument to his relation Alessandro Zambeccari.
