= San Pietro, Perugia =

Minor basilica

Coordinates: 43.101°N 12.396°E

Basilica of Saint Peter
- Basilica di San Pietro
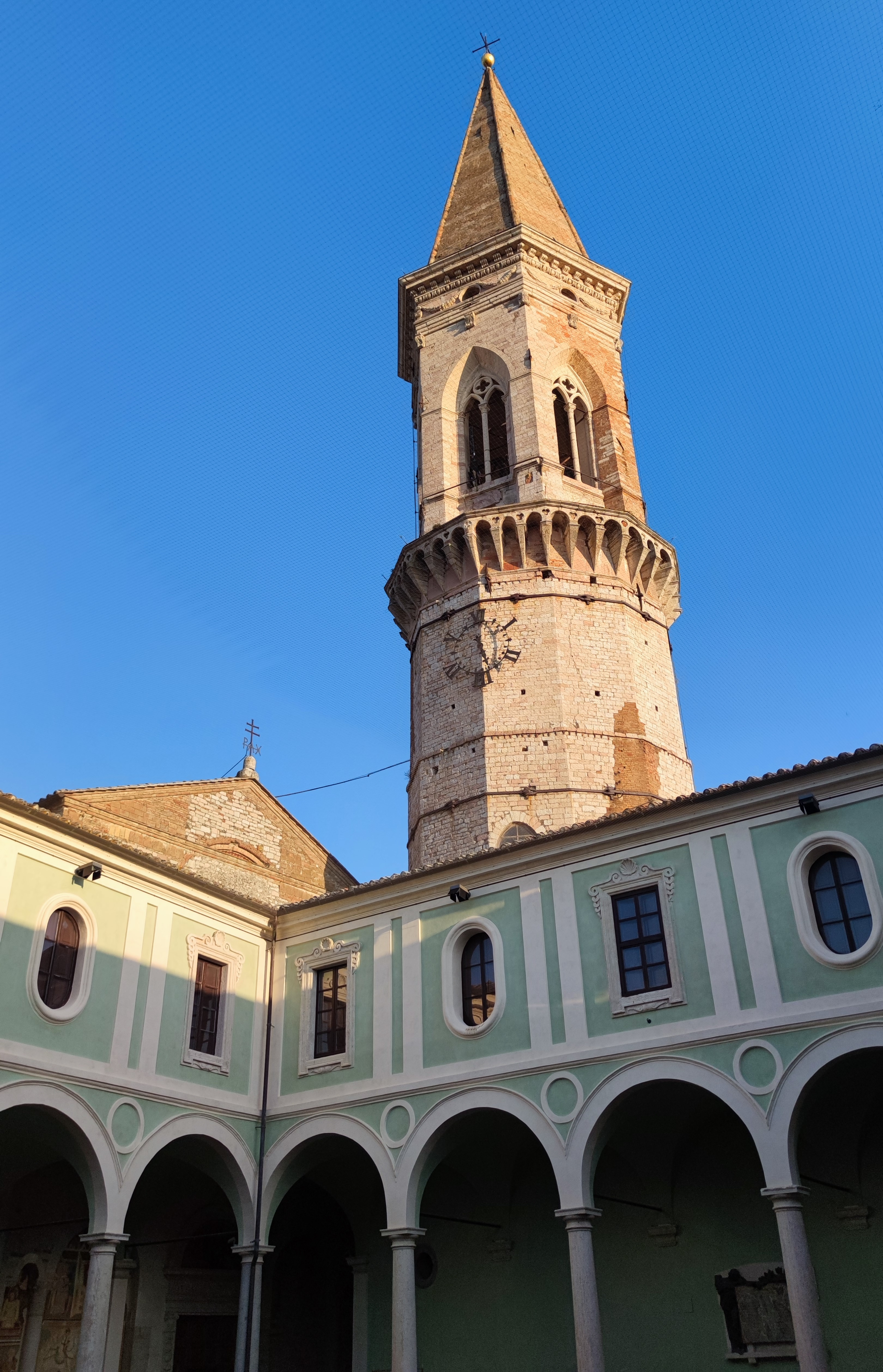
- Abbey in 2023

Religion
- Region: Umbria

Location
- Location: Perugia
- State: Italy
- Interactive map of Basilica of Saint Peter

Architecture
- Style: Gothic, Renaissance, Baroque
- Groundbreaking: 996
- Completed: 17th century

Website
- https://www.umbriatourism.it/it/-/abbazia-di-san-pietro

The basilica di San Pietro is a Catholic basilica and abbey in the Italian city of Perugia. Its bell tower, standing at 70 meters tall, is the tallest structure in Perugia and is one of the city's most significant symbols. It is an Italian national monument.

== History ==
The abbey of San Pietro was built around the year 996 over the previous cathedral church, as the first bishopric of Perugia. Its origin is probably older, dating back to the 4th century (after the Edict of Milan). It rises up on a sacred Etruscan-Roman area, even though the first documents mentioning the church are from 1002. The founder was the abbot Pietro Vincioli, a nobleman from Perugia, later canonised.

In the following centuries the abbey increased its power greatly, until in 1398 it was taken and set on fire by the citizens of Perugia, who blamed the abbot Francesco Guidalotti for having taken part in the conspiracy against the leader of the popular party of Perugia of the Raspanti Biordo Michelotti. The monastery had a new period of expansion under Pope Eugenio IV, who joined it to the Congregation of St. Justine of Padua (later known as Cassinese), thus maintaining a position of prestige and power in the city.

In 1591 began a thirty-year period of work directed by Valentino Martelli who changed the complex to the present aspect we see today.

The abbey was temporarily suppressed by the Jacobins in 1799. According to historical tradition, on 20 June 1859 the monks gave shelter to some patriots who, raising against the papal authority at the incitement of the main exponents of the local Freemasonry, clashed with the regiment of Swiss soldiers of the Papal States (the 1859 Perugia uprising). Consequently, after the intervention of the Piedmontese army and the long-awaited Unification of Italy, the new government allowed the Benedictines to remain in the abbey, granting an extension to the Pepoli decree which sanctioned the state ownership of the ecclesiastical property, until the religious persons present at the events of 20 June 1859 were reduced to three. When, in 1890, the third last monk died, Law no. 4799 of 10 July 1887 was implemented, which established that the property of the suppressed abbey of San Pietro was to be used for the creation of an "Institute of Agricultural Education" to be founded in Perugia, currently the Department of Agricultural, Food and Environmental Sciences of the University of Perugia.

== Description ==
=== Exterior ===
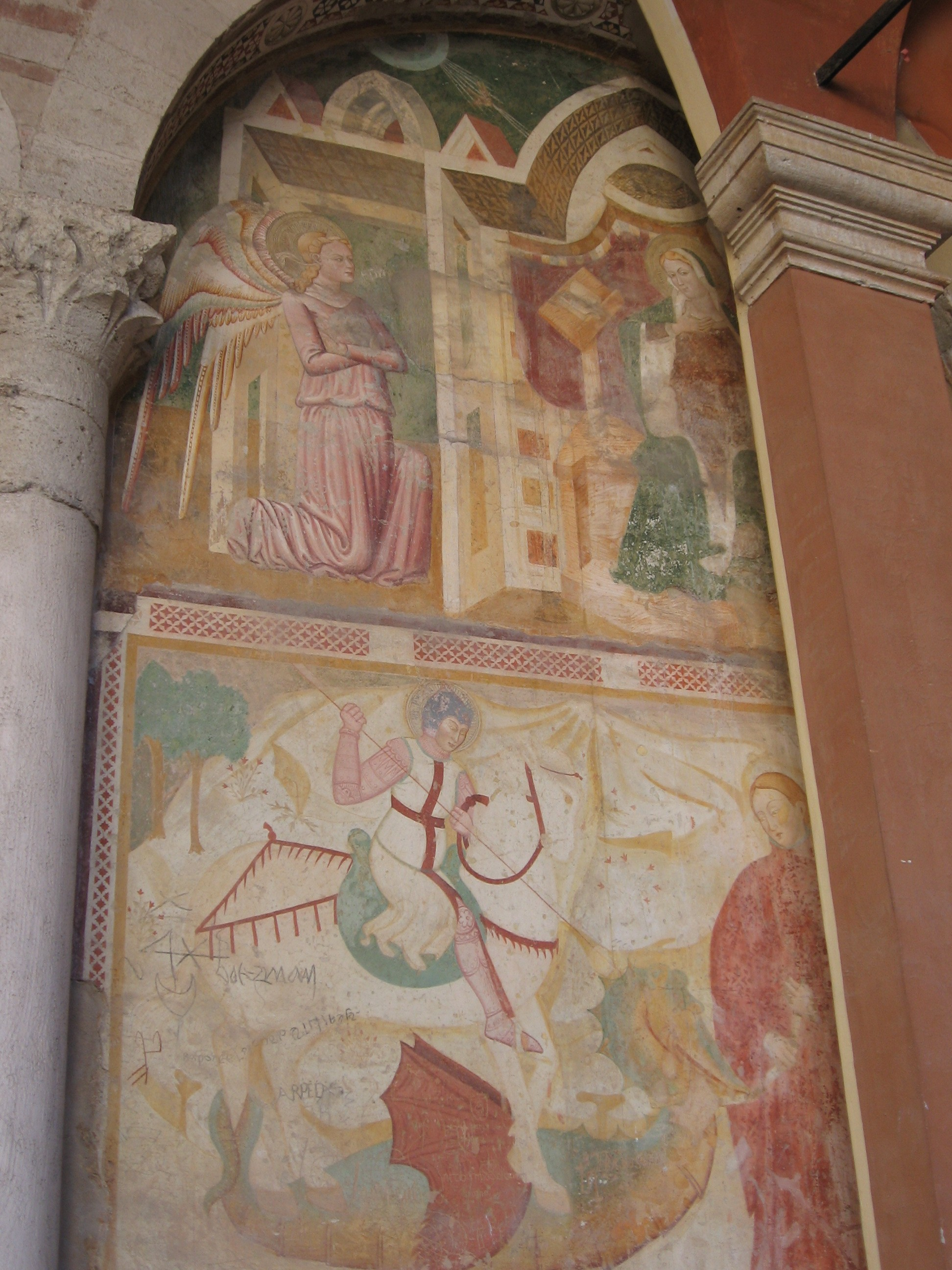
Fresco with Saint George and the Dragon

The monastery is preceded by the 14th century gate of Porta di San Pietro designed by Agostino di Duccio, which leads into Borgo XX Giugno and, shortly after, to a monumental facade with three arcades reflecting the opposite porta di Duccio; it was designed around 1614 by the Perugine architect Valentino Martelli, who also designed the cloister, then completed by Lorenzo Petrozzi on the second floor.

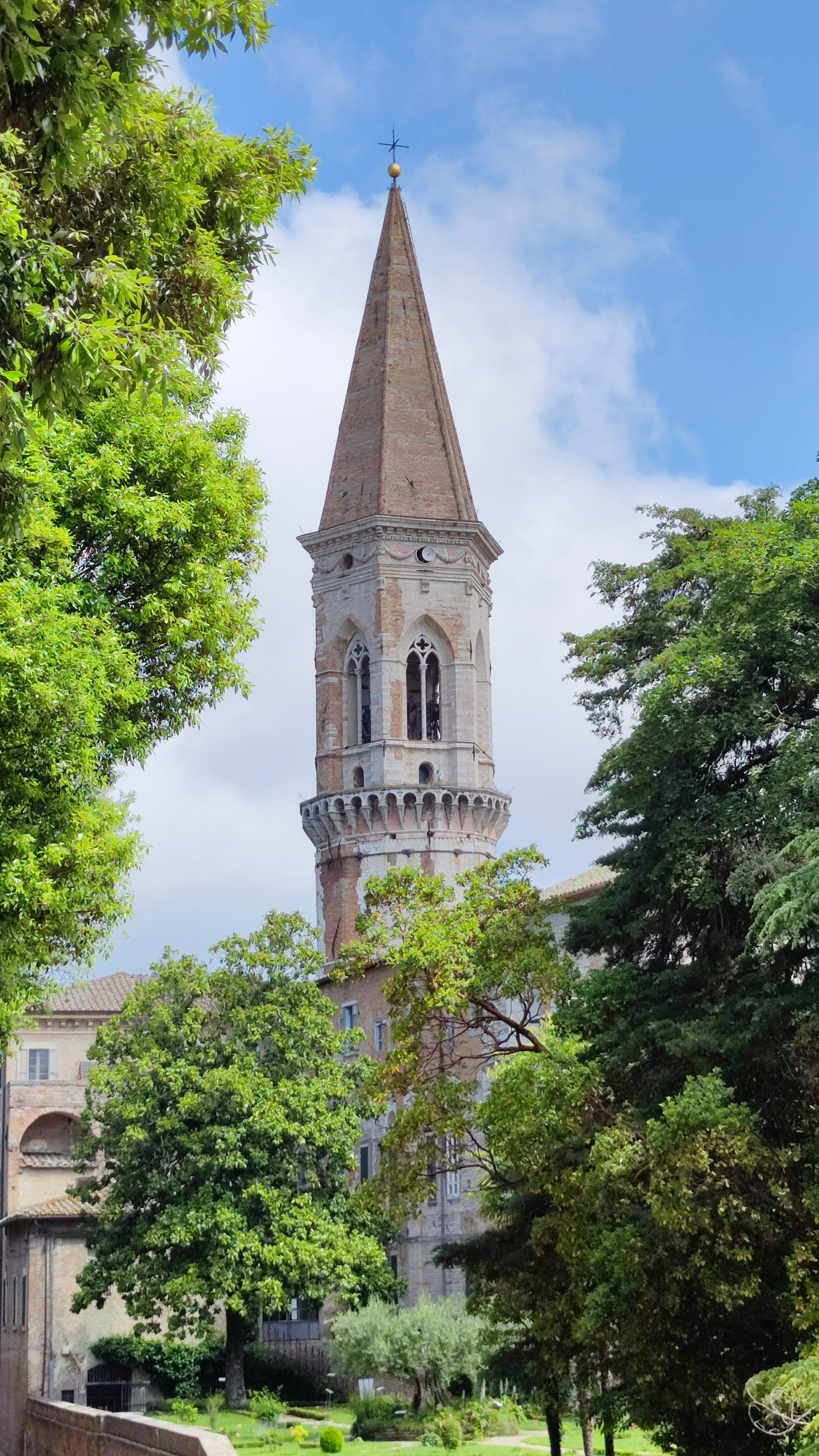
The tower

The entrance to the church is on the left side of the cloister. The stony gate, probably by Agostino di Duccio, is surmounted by a lunette with a Madonna and Child by Giannicola di Paolo (currently replaced by a copy, the original is in the Galleria Tesori d'Arte). Remains of the facade of the ancient basilica can be seen on the right and left of the 15th century portal: inside the blind arches, the 4th century frescoes, rediscovered during the restoration works of the second half of the 20th century, have come to light; they are attributed to the Maestro Ironico (first half of the 15th century). On the left are Saints Peter and Paul, the Annunciation, St. George and the Dragon, the Pietas, on the right is a rare example of the Trinità trifronte (with three faces of Christ - as in two other churches in Perugia, St. Agatha and St. Mary of Colombata).

These frescoes had been covered, but at the same time, also preserved by an enceinte on which, in the 15th century, was painted a fresco depicting a large St. Christopher, the patron saint of travelers, a figure frequently painted in the late Middle Ages on the pilgrims' transit routes. Traces of the disappeared painting were still visible until the middle of the 20th century, as portrayed in a fresco by Benedetto Bonfigli located in the Cappella dei Priori in Palazzo dei Priori (nowadays in the Galleria Nazionale dell'Umbria) which depicts the church as it was in the 15th century.

The polygonal bell tower on the right of the gate is 70 meters high, with a tapered pinnacle and was built in the 13th century on the basis of the pre-existing Roman mausoleum, and completed, after various incidents, in 1463–68 with Florentine Gothic-Renaissance lines on a design by Bernardo Rossellino.

=== Internal ===
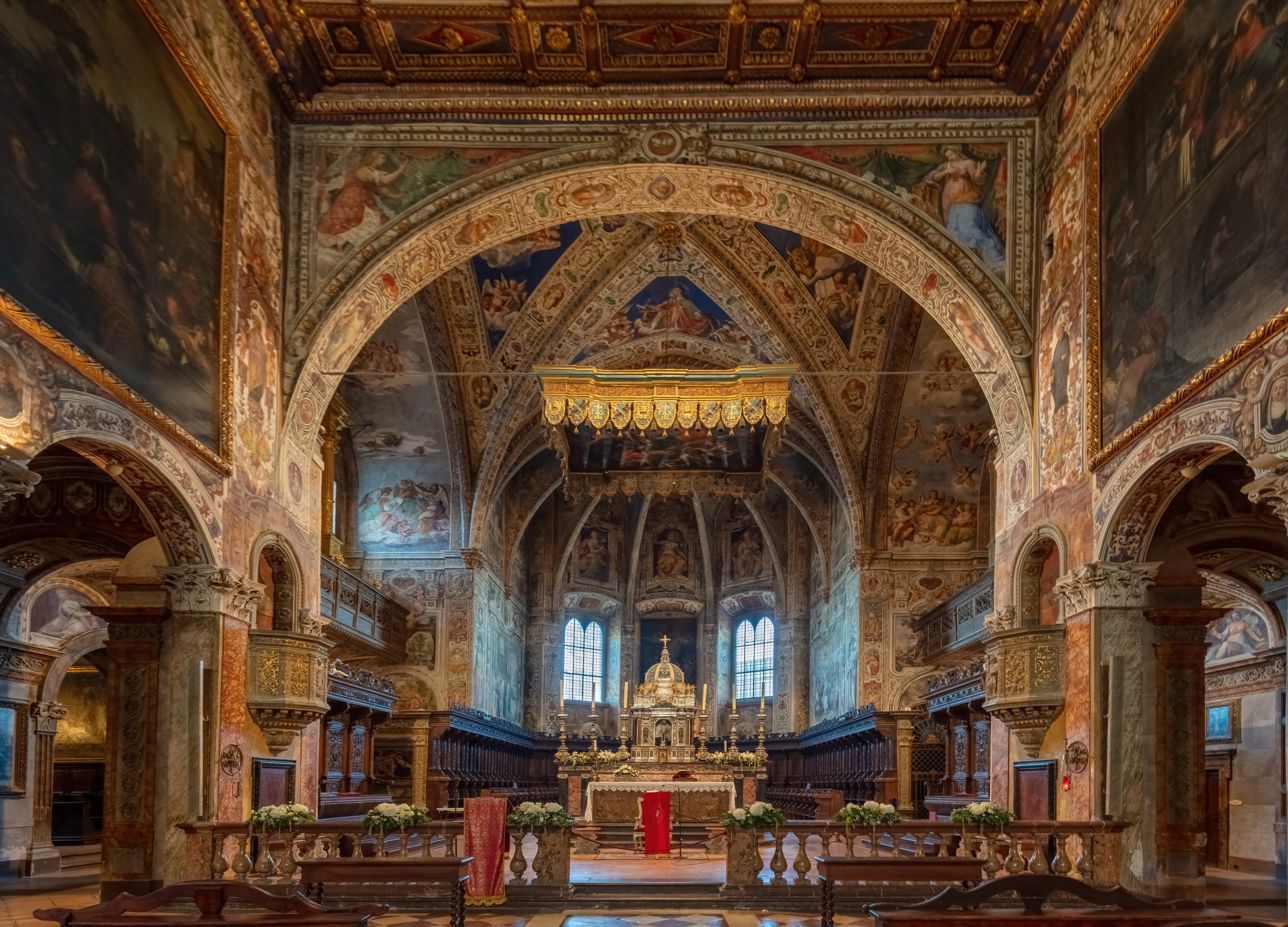
Altar of the basilica

The interior preserves the original architectural structure of the basilica, which was followed, between the 15th and 17th centuries, by numerous decorative interventions that blended harmoniously with the structure. In spite of the Napoleonic spoliations that followed one another in 1797 and 1813, it remains the richest church in the city and houses the largest art collection in Perugia, after the Galleria Nazionale dell'Umbria. The nave is articulated by arcades on 18 grey marble columns datable between the end of the III and the beginning of the 4th century AD with unique spolia capitals, probably coming from Roman times.

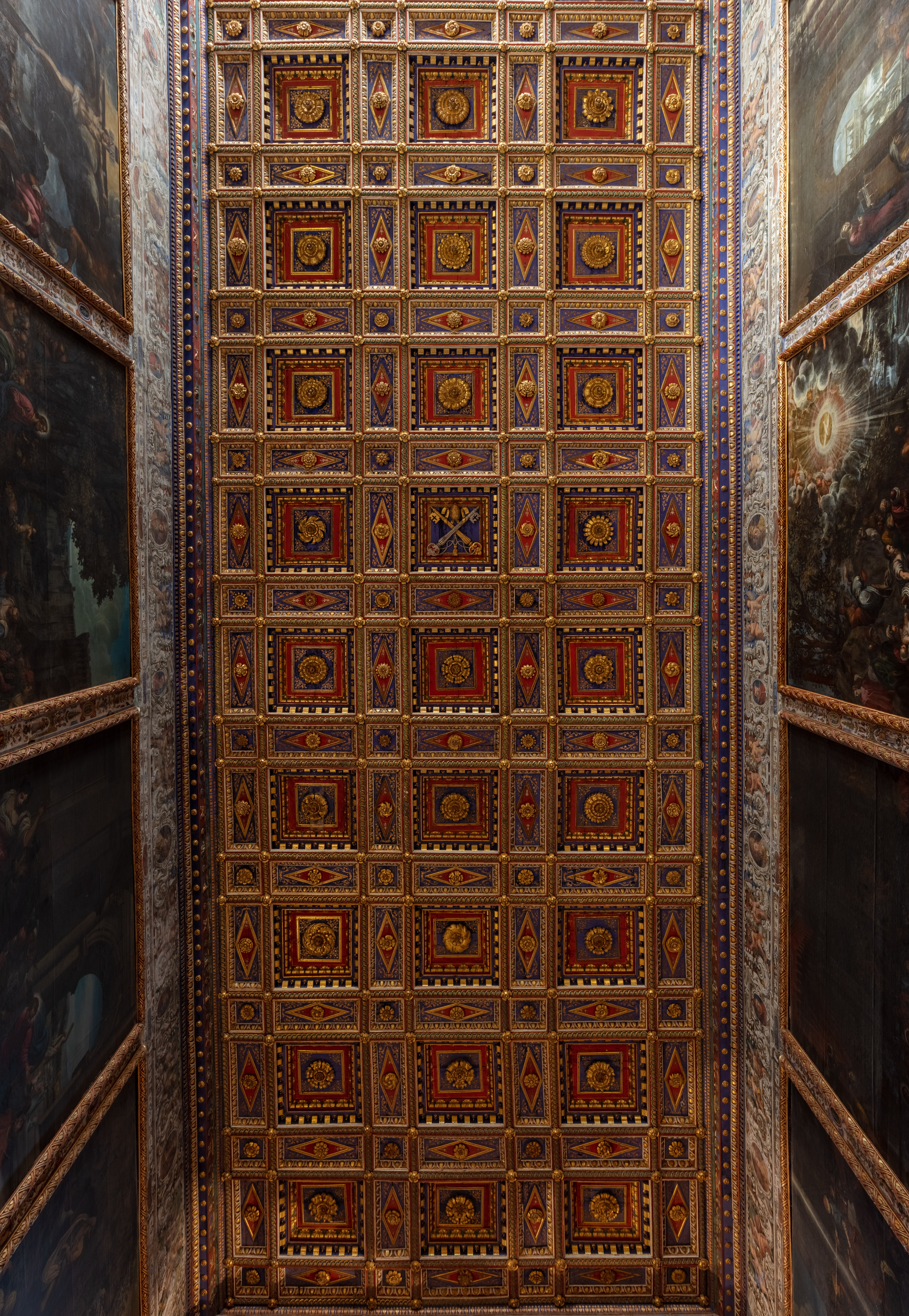
Detail of the ceiling

=== Central nave and counter-façade ===
The upper part is decorated with majestic canvas depicting scenes from the Old and New Testaments, commissioned by Abbot Giacomo da San Felice da Salò and completed in 1591–1611. They were made in Venice by the Greek painter Antonio Vassillachi, known as l'Aliense, a pupil of Paolo Veronese and Tintoretto. Also by Vassillachi is the monumental canvas on the west wall Trionfo dell'ordine dei Benedettini ('Apotheosis of the Benedictine Order'). The remaining fresco decorations are by Giovanni Bisconti, Orazio Martini and Benedetto Bandiera. The central nave has a richly decorated wooden coffered ceiling by Benedetto di Giovanni from Montepulciano 1556.

On the counter-façade wall on the left there are the paintings San Pietro guarisce lo storpio and S. Pietro liberato dall’Angelo ('St. Peter heals the cripple' and 'St. Peter freed by the Angel') by Orazio Alfani, on the right Naufragio di San Pietro ('St. Peter's shipwreck') and Approdo di S. Paolo a Malta ('St. Paul's landing in Malta') by Leonardo Cungi, both dated 1556. The second column on the left of the nave with the image of the founder of the church Abbot Peter is the so-called miracle column, which, according to tradition, was stopped by the Abbot while falling over the workforce. In the opposite column is a Saint Benedict; both frescoes are attributed to the school of Benedetto Bonfigli.

=== Right aisle, St. Joseph and angels chapels ===
At the beginning of the right aisle the first piece depicts La Madonna in trono e Santi ('The Madonna on the throne and Saints') by Eusebio da San Giorgio (16th century), followed by Assunzione della Vergine ('The Assumption of the Virgin') by Orazio Alfani (16th century), Santa Scholastica by Francesco Appiani (1751), lI miracolo della Colonna ('The Miracle of the Column') by Giacinto Cimignani da Pistoia (1677), Il miracolo di San Mauro ('The Miracle of St. Mauro') by Cesare Sermei (1648), Davide sceglie tra i tre Castighi ('Davide chooses among the three Chastisements') by Ventura Salimbeni (1602), San Benedetto Consegna la regola ai Monaci ('St. Benedict Delivering the Rule to the Monks') by Eusebio da S. Giorgio, with the martirio di S. Cristina ('Martyrdom of St. Christina') at its base, San Gregorio Magno in processione con il popolo durante la peste ('St. Gregory the Great in procession with the people during the plague') by Ventura Salimbeni (1602), Sansone ('Samson') by François Perrier (17th century) and on the left the Pietà of Sebastiano del Piombo school. Above the door that leads to St. Joseph Chapel there are three small paintings: Madonna con Bambino e S. Elisabetta e S. Giovannino ('Virgin Mary with Infant Christ and St. Elizabeth and Infant Saint John the Baptist') by Bonifazio Pilati da Verona (XVI) and S. Mauro and S. Placido, which are copies from Perugino by Giovanni Battista Salvi called Sassoferrato (XVII).

Along the wall the St. Joseph Chapel was decorated with frescoes in 1857 by the sixteen-year-old Domenico Bruschi from Perugia: in the vault are the four cardinal virtues, in which he used the Purismo style like Perugino, learned by his master Silvestro Valeri. On the right the canvas La vergine con S. Elisabetta e S. Giovannino ('The Virgin Mary with St. Elizabeth and John the Baptist as an Infant') by an artist from the Tuscan School (16th century).

In the nave following the Resurrezione di Cristo ('Resurrection of Christ') by Orazio Alfani and, above the door of the sacristy, three small paintings by Sassoferrato: Santa Flavia, Santa Apollonia and Santa Caterina. At the end of the nave La Cappella delle Reliquie o degli angeli ('the Chapel of Relics or of the Angels') with a wrought iron gate, 16th century stuccoes and frescoes by Benedetto Bandiera (1599). On the sides of the entrance to the presbytery are two paintings by Gian Domenico Cerrini (17th century): Vergine che allatta il Bambino e San Giovanni Battista ('the Virgin nursing the Infant Jesus and St. John the Baptist').

=== Presbytery ===
The altar contains the relics of the abbot Pietro Vincioli, the founder of the church. It is adorned with polychrome marble by the architect Valentino Martelli (1592). The ciborium by Sante Ghetti from Carrara (1627) is a miniature temple, also made of rare polychrome marbles.

The main feature of the presbytery is the intarsia of the wood-panelled choir, considered one of the most beautiful in Italy. It was begun by Bernardino di Luca Antonini in 1525–26, and completed by Stefano di Antoniolo Zambelli, from Bergamo, in 1535. with other collaborators, two of whom, Battista Bolognese and Ambrogio Francese, made the large lectern. Particularly noteworthy is the central door, with a relief portraying the Annunciation and Moses Saved from the Water by fra Damiano da Bergamo (1536). It leads to the small balcony situated behind the altar, right in the middle of the wooden choir, with a view which opens up along the entire Umbrian valley towards Mount Subasio. The signature of Giosuè Carducci dated 1871 stands out framed on the left side of the small balcony wall.

The gold heightened seats are by Benedetto da Montepulciano and Benvenuto da Brescia. The pulpits on the sides of the presbytery and other structural components by Francesco di Guido da Settignano (16th century), a member of the Tuscan family of stonemasons, are Renaissance in style.

Benedetto Bandiera illustrated the Four Evangelists (1591) in the rib vaults of the apse, and the canvas the Death of St. Benedict (1591) within the two windows in the exedra. The frescoes on the side walls are the Delivery of the Keys and The Conversion of Paul the Apostle by Giovanni Battista Lombardelli (1591) and the ones in the lunettes are the Theological and Cardinal Virtues by Silla Piccinini (also known as Scilla Pecennini) and Pietro Rancanelli (XVI).

The triumphal arch of the presbytery is painted with scenes of harvest and grape harvest by the landscape painter Giovanni Fiammingo (1592), whereas the characters are by Silla Piccinini and Pietro Rancanelli.

=== Left aisle, Vibi, Ranieri and Sacramento chapels ===
At the bottom of the left aisle the Pietà with St. Geronimo and St. Leonardo (15th century), attributed to Benedetto Bonfigli or Fiorenzo di Lorenzo, on the right wall San Pietro piange per aver rinnegato Gesù ('St. Peter weeping for having denied Jesus') attributed to Guercino (XVI), on the left side a canvas attributed to Giovanni Lanfranco (XVII) depicting Cristo nell'Orto confrontato dall'angelo ('Christ in the Garden comforted by the Angel').

In the Vibi Chapel is located the marble reredos with Infant Jesus, the Baptist and St. Jerome (1453), attributed to Mino da Fiesole. In the lunette there once was the Annunciation by Giovanni Battista Caporali, on the left wall the Visitation of Polydorus by Stefano Ciburri (1530). On the right the Madonna del Giglio by Sassoferrato, made from the one by Lo Spagna.

Leaving the nave in front of the Vibi chapel a St. Paul attributed to Guercino, in the left aisle the Deposition by Gian Battista Salvi called Sassoferrato (XVII), copy of the famous Deposition by Raffaello, today at the Galleria Borghese in Rome.

Next is the Ranieri Chapel, originally Baglioni, that was designed by Francesco di Guido di Virio da Settignano. The vault displays an Assumption of the Virgin by Annibale Brugnoli (19th century), which is inspired by Titian's prototype, but has more delicate colours, painted over a previous decoration by Caporali; on the left wall is a canvas with Jesus in the garden attributed to Guido Reni (17th century) and on the right Jesus and Saint Veronica by G. Francesco Gessi (17th century).

Back in the nave, the Giuditta con testa di Oloferne ('Judith with the head of Holofernes') by Sassoferrato (17th century).

Next is the Sacrament Chapel. Its vault is decorated by Francesco Appiani with perspective quadraturas by Pietro Carattoli. On the altar an image of the Madonna del Giglio from the 14th century attributed to Lo Spagna, which comes from a rural chapel and placed in the centre of a painting of St. Peter and St. Paul by Jean-Baptiste Wicar (19th century). On the walls large canvases by Giorgio Vasari (1566): Nozze di Cana ('Marriage at Cana'), Il Profeta Eliseo ('the Prophet Elisha') and Il miracolo della mensa di S. Benedetto ('the miracle of the table of St. Benedict'). The canvas S. Benedetto manda S. Mauro in Francia ('St. Benedict sends St. Maurus to France') on the left is by Giovanni Fiammingo (XVI).

Returning to the nave the Adoration of the Magi by Eusebio da San Giorgio (16th century), the Assumption by Orazio Alfani (16th century), the Annunciation of Sassoferrato and the polychrome wooden Crucifix attributed to Giovanni Tedesco.

Following the Pietà, a late work by Perugino, where the painter portrays himself in the face of Giuseppe di Arimatea. The piece, coming from the church of Sant'Agostino, was part of the Sant'Agostino Altarpiece; and S. Pietro Abate dell'Appiani (18th century). At the end of the nave are the Fatti S. Mauro and S. Placiduo by Giacinto Gimignani (1677).

=== Sacristy ===
The sacristy, built in 1451, has a large works collection; the upper floor, where the wardrobes are, has carvings in leather and the floor was made of Deruta majolica by Giacomo Mancini in the 16th century. In the vault are frescoes of the Stories of the Old Testament by Silla Piccinini, or Pecennini, (16th century), while on the walls are Stories of St. Peter and Paul by Girolamo Danti (1574). On the right is a canvas of the Holy Family attributed to Parmigianino, and in the corner is a small painting of Infant Jesus and Infant Saint John the Baptist attributed to the young Raphael. Christ at the Column (XVII), Madonna with Child (XVI), and Christ Blessing (XVII) are by unknown artists. Within the windows is a Visitation by Sebastiano Conca (XVIII). The most important paintings are the five small paintings by Perugino with images of Santa Scholastica, S. Ercolano, S. Constantino, S. Pietro Abbate, S. Mauro and S. Placido. They were painted for the predella of the large altarpiece Ascension (1496), which adorned the main church altar. The canvas was confiscated in 1796 by the Napoleonic commissioner Giacomo Tinet (today it is exposed at the Museum of Lyon). Above these paintings Frances of Rome educated by an Angel of an unknown Caravagesque.

=== Medieval crypt ===
The left aisle leads to the apse where there is an early medieval crypt discovered in 1979, with a circular plan with a suggesting ambulatory and plastered walls painted with geometric and figurative motifs.

=== The abbey with the three cloisters ===
The abbey has three cloisters: the first, at the entrance, dates back to the 17th century by Valentino Martelli; the second is the Main Cloister, a Renaissance construction of the 1530s, attributed to Guido da Settignano, set on three floors with a well in the centre by Galeotto di Paolo di Assisi. As in other monasteries, around it there were large halls where communal life took place: the chapter, the refectory, the schoolrooms, the library, the archive and the scriptorium.

Under the portico, on the side facing the entrance, there is the ancient access to the Chapter House, which has now become the main hall of the Library of the Faculty of Agriculture "Mario Marte". At the entrance of the former refectory, nowadays the Aula Magna, is a 15th-century glazed terracotta laver depicting the la Samaritana al pozzo ('Samaritan woman at the well'), attributed to Benedetto Buglione. The upper floor was reserved for the dormitory or the cells of the monks.

The third cloister, the Chiostro delle Stelle ('cloister of the stars'), 1571, was designed by Galeazzo Alessi. It is so called because it has star-shaped openings on the ground from where rainwater entered to be carried into a cistern.

=== Medieval garden ===
From the cloisters one can access the Medieval Garden laid out in 1996. It presents a symbolic revival of the Ortus conclusus, the garden of the monastery that allegedly provided the essential sustenance for self-sufficiency; at the same time it is also claimed to be an ideal garden, which unfolds a symbolic path of the evolution of men. There are the remains of an ancient fish farm and various springs, which suggests the uninterrupted presence of the water element.

In the garden the medieval gate on the important road to Rome; nearby lays a stone with a carved shell indicating the distance between Rome and St. Jacopo di Compostela, because the Jacobean itinerary also passed through here.

To the right one can glimpse the Giardini del Frontone, which expand the greenery of the Ortus conclusus. In the past they were the favourite square of Braccio da Montone for his military exercises; nowadays there is a garden by the Perugine Arcadi, a garden with a small 18th-century theatre and statues from the 20th century.

=== Tesori d’Arte gallery ===
The abbey houses the Tesori d’Arte gallery of the Fondazione per l'Istruzione agraria with works from San Pietro abbey as well as from the proprieties of Casalina and Sant'Apollinare. On display is a vast collection of works which span the end of the 15th to the 19th century, including the detached fresco by Giannicola di Paolo, previously located above the portal of the basilica. The gallery also houses a vast collection of illuminated choir books from the 15th and 16th centuries.

=== Migrated works ===
During the French occupation, the church was subjected to several Napoleonic spoliations. According to the Catalogo by Canova, several works were stored there and sent to France and never returned after the Congress of Vienna. The most important are:

- Ascension, Giovanni Battista Salvi da Sassoferrato, in Paris in January 1814 and in the Musée Napoléon/Louvre from 1814
- God in Glory, lunette 280x216 cm, Lione, Musée des Beaux-Arts
- San Pietro Polyptych, cymatium, 114x230 cm, Lione, Musée des Beaux-Arts
- Tondo of Jeremy, 127 cm in diameter), Nantes, Musée des Beaux-Arts
- Tondo of Isaiah, 127 cm in diameter), Nantes, Musée des Beaux-Arts
- Adoration of the Magi, predella panel 32x59 cm, Rouen, Musée des Beaux-Arts
- Baptism of Christ, predella panel 32x59 cm, Rouen, Musée des Beaux-Arts
- Resurrection, predella panel 32x59 cm, Rouen, Musée des Beaux-Arts

Once there were two works in the sacristy: Gesù che porta la Croce (Jesus carrying the Cross) of Mantegna and the Coronation of Bassano. Both were smuggled in the theft of 29 March 1916.

== See also ==
- Perugia
