= 1859 Perugia uprising =

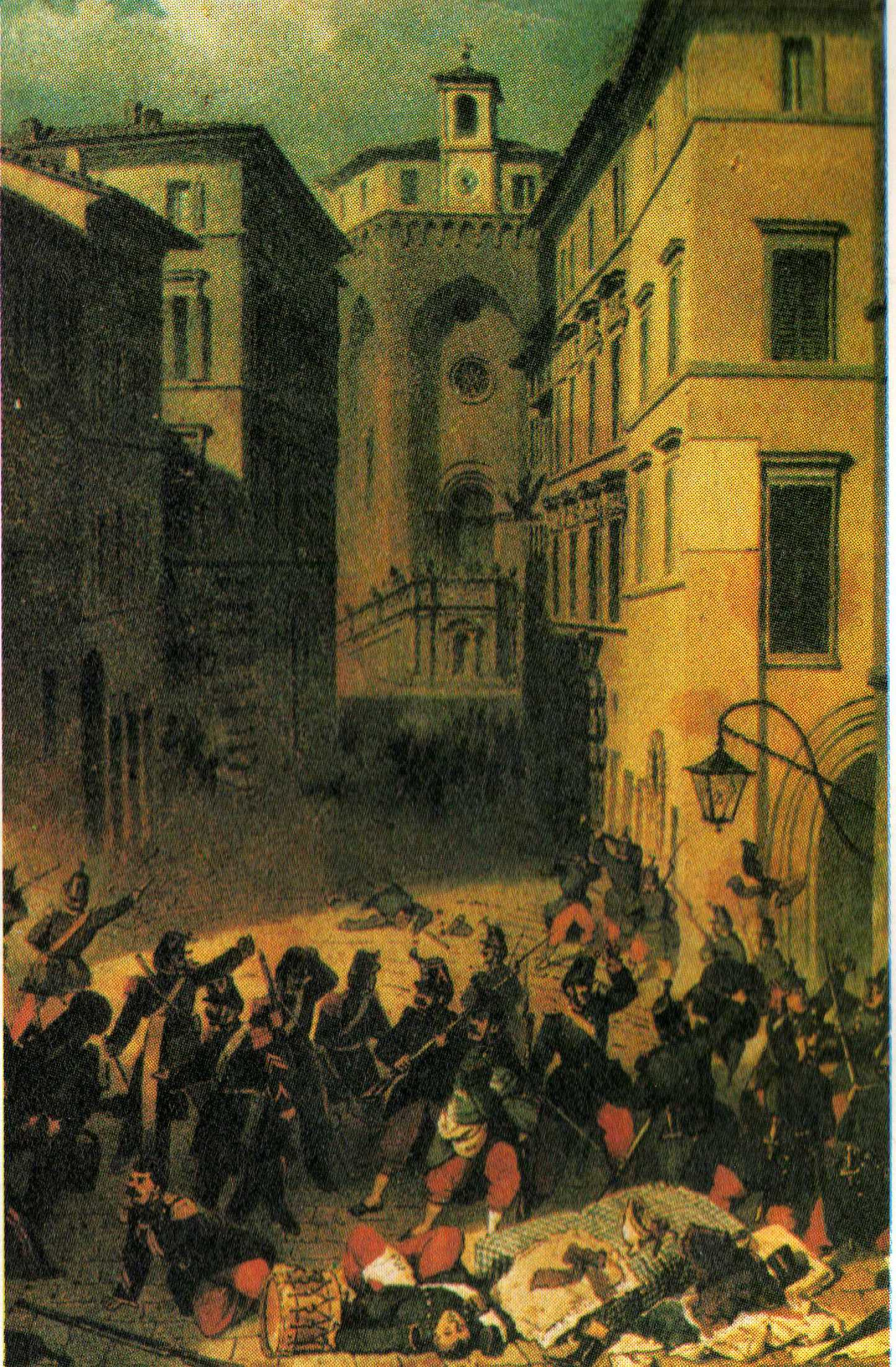
Regiments of the Swiss Guard attacking rebels, by Napoleone Verga

The 1859 Perugia uprising occurred on 20 June 1859, in Perugia, central Italy. The inhabitants rebelled against the temporal authority of the pope (under the Papal States) and established a provisional government, but the insurrection was bloodily suppressed by Pope Pius IX's troops.

When Perugia later became free of Papal control, due to Italian unification, King Victor Emmanuel II of Italy sent some of his troops to protect the retreating Papal troops from the vengeful citizens.

== Origins ==
The Second Italian War of Independence saw eight hundred youths from Perugia rush to volunteer in the Royal Sardinian Army in the northern front of Italy, while in Perugia itself an insurrectionary committee made contact with the Società Nazionale, particularly with the latter at Florence and Bologna.

On the 14th of June, the committee asked the pontifical government, through the intermediary of its representative at Perugia, Luigi Giordani, to abandon the position of neutrality it had adopted in the war in Italy. With the refusal to collaborate from the pontifical representative, the committee expelled him and created a provisional government, which offered the dictatorship to Victor Emmanuel II.

This organisation organised a commandment of the town square, a defence committee and other essential governing bodies for public surety and defence. These were necessary because it became quickly apparent that the pontifical government had decided to prevent patriotic movements which threatened what was left of the Papal States. The pontifical government was not prepared to give up Perugia, and prepared to make, by retaking it by force, an example that would be remembered. It also clearly appeared that there was no support available from Camillo Benso, Count of Cavour, who had his hands tied by the agreements with Napoleon III, although he found the insurrection in Perugia had strong motivations that would be useful for his political campaigns.

The Cardinal Secretary of State Giacomo Antonelli, informed of what had happened, gave the order on the 14th of June to Giordani (who had retired to Foligno) "to stop all disorder, calling if necessary a company from Spoleto", in the expectation of reinforcements of "two thousand men and perhaps even of the French". The French aid was rejected however by the commander of the occupation body of Goyon, but they prepared the expedition of the first foreign regiment, which counted around 1700 men, under the orders of Colonel Anton Schmid, a Swiss mercenary leader from Altdorf in Papal service since 1855. They arrived at Foligno on the 19th of June, where Schmid, Giordani and the State Counsellor Luigi Lattanzi decided to head directly towards Perugia, to prevent the arrival of reinforcements from Tuscany.

== Massacres and pillaging ==
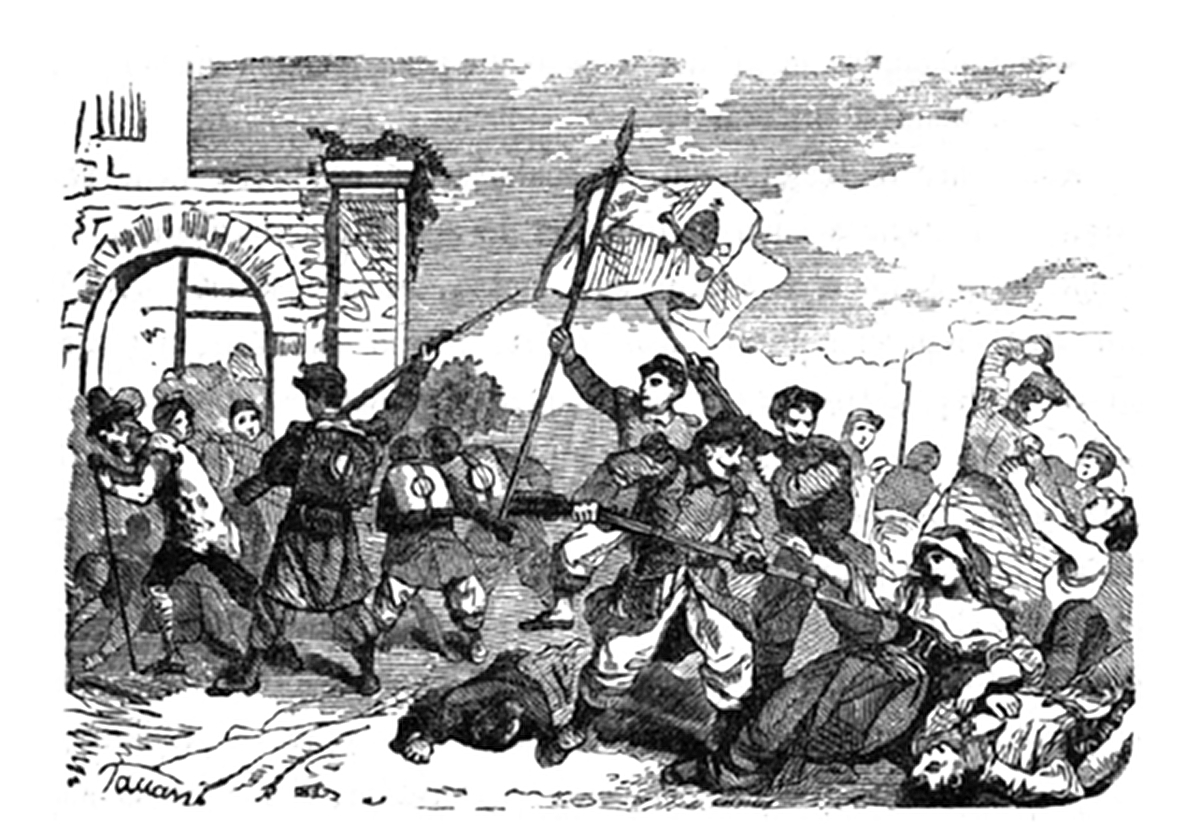
Massacre of Perugini patriots by Papal troops

The provisional government launched a courageous call to the people to prepare to defend themselves.

During the 20th of June the pontifical troops, two thousand strong and composed of a large section of Swiss, appeared before Perugia. They found before them several thousand citizens dispersed across a vast front, badly organised and badly armed - from Tuscany arrived hundreds of guns but many were not in good condition - the patriots were animated with a fierce will to defend themselves.

The resistance was broken after a brief but fierce combat which had the Port San Pietro as its epicentre; the pontifical forces lost 10 men and the Perugians 27. The battle was followed by pillage, accompanied by a massacre of the civilian population, which immediately made this first episode of the people’s war of 1859 infamous.

A prominent figure throughout these massacres was the abbot of the monastery of San Pietro, Placido Acquacotta, who hid numerous civilians and helped them in their escape.

== Testimonies ==
“By the confession of Schmidt, thirty houses were pillaged in which the women were massacred; a monastery, two churches, a hospital, and an orphanage of young girls were invaded and two of the girls were raped in view of their mistresses and their comrades. Following the atrocity of the looters, as a logical continuation, the legal government was banned by Schmidt who with his acolytes benefitted from a large number of favours and honorific titles; solemn and magnificent funerals were celebrated by the Cardinal-Bishop Pecci, today Pope Leo XIII, with the devilish inscription carried on the catafalque: ‘Happy are those who die in the grace of the Lord.’” — Il risorgimento, in “Storia generale d'Italia”», under the direction of Pasquale Villari. F. Vallardi editor. Milan, 1881, p. 376

“Besides, many families there still bleed from the hideous massacres of Perugia and Viterbo, and we find more than one father, more than one husband that by a refinement of barbarism, a wild soldier had forced them to assist in the revolting outrage inflicting on their daughter or their wife; because nothing equals the atrocities committed at Perugia by the adventurers that the Swiss catholic Schmidt commanded, when in 1859 the court of Rome charged this foreigner with the care of returning the pontifical yoke on the inhabitants of Perugia where the insurrection had risen without any spilling of blood, because the roman garrison had withdrawn without firing a shot, whereas after the taking of the town, Schmidt delivered there all the horrors of pillage...” — Petr Aleksandrovich Chikhachev : Le royaume d'Italie, éditions Ch. Albessard et Bérard, Paris, 1862, p. 10

== Responsibilities ==
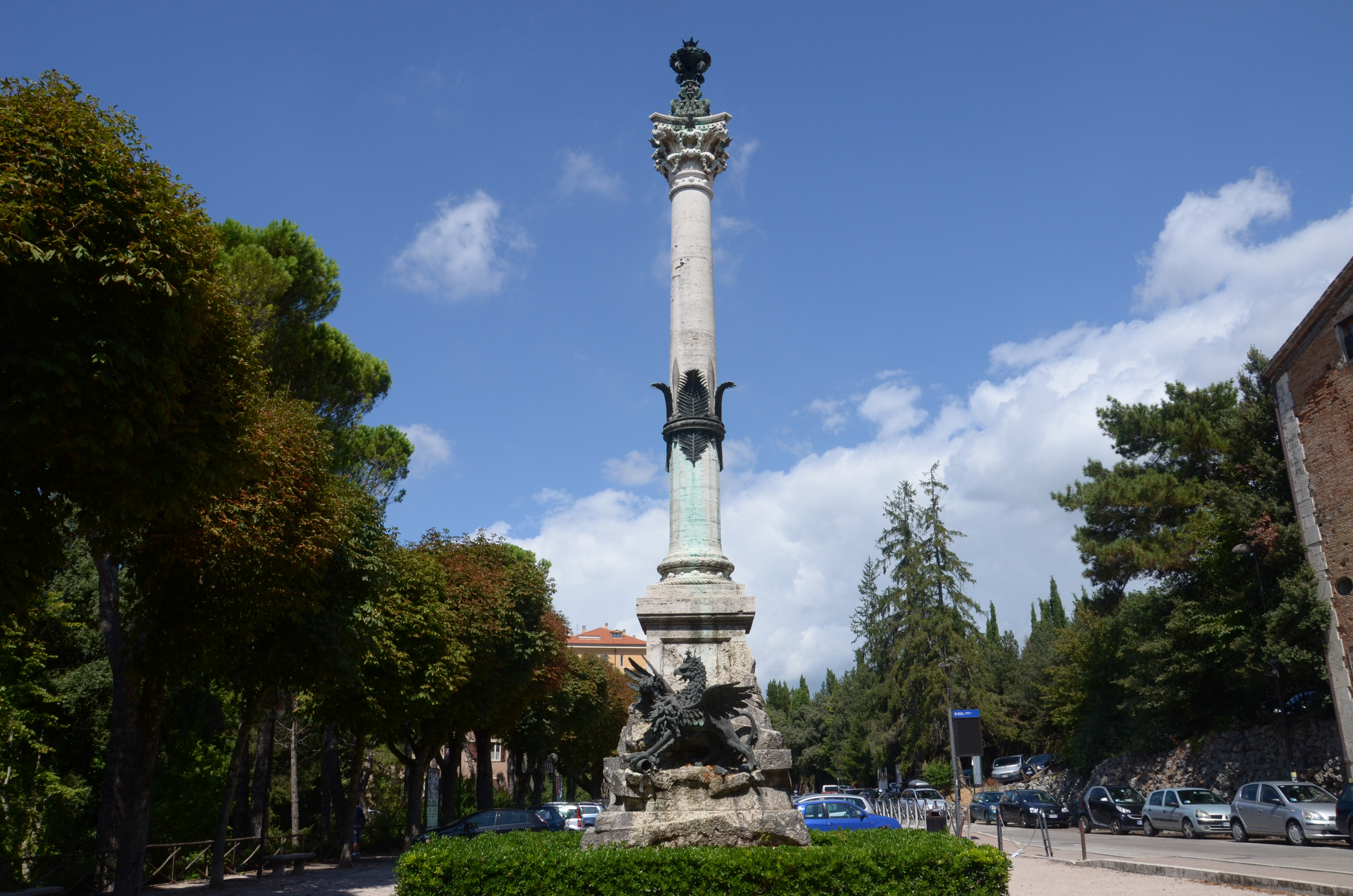
Memorial column in Perugia to the 1859 uprising

There is some trouble to discern at which point Pope Pius IX was potentially considered as responsible for what happened. At his departure from Rome, it seemed that Schmidt had received the following secret instructions, signed by Cavalier Luigi Mazio, General Military Auditor (who assumed the role of Substitute Minister of pontifical arms, the role of minister and commissioner being then vacant): “The undersigned, substitute commissioner for the minister, gives the charge to Your Excellence to recuperate on behalf of the Sanctity of Our Lord the conquered provinces by a small number of factions, and to this end he recommends that you be energetic so that it will serve as an example to others, and keep them far from the revolution. I give in addition to Your Seigniory the right to decapitate the revolters which are found in their houses, to not spare any expenses of the Government, the expenditure of the present expedition must be supported by the Province itself. Substitute Minister C.L. Mazio “ (in R. Ugolini, p. 35)

This order, made public on the 29th of June, was denied by the pontifical government, which qualified it as “malicious invention”.

=== Revisionist theory ===
Angela Pellicciari evokes the theory that the Perugia insurrection (“Strage di Perugia, che strage non é”) would be an event explicitly desired by Cavour, serving as a pretext a year later in the invasion of Marche.

== Bibliography ==
- Bertolini, Francesco (1898). Storia del Risorgimento italiano, 1814-1870 (in Italian). Milan: Ulrico Hoepli. pp. 148–149.
- Carducci, Giosuè (1880). Juvenilia (in Italian). Bologne: Nicola Zanichelli. p. 238.
- Chikhachev, Petr Aleksandrovich (1862). Le royaume d'Italie : étudié sur les lieux mêmes (in French). Paris: Ch. Albessard et Bérard. p. 163.
- Gay, Harry Nelson (1907). Uno screzio diplomatico fra il governo pontificio e il governo americano (Incident diplomatique entre le Gouvernement pontifical et le gouvernement américain) : e la condetta degli Svizzeri a Perugia il 20 giugno 1859 (en relation avec l'intervention délictueuse des soldats suisses à Pérouse du 20 juin 1859 (in Italian). Pérouse: Unione tipografica cooperativa. p. 201.
- Pineschi, Zenone F. (1867). Lo Eccidio di Perugia consumato dal Colonnello Antonio Schmid d'ordine di Pio Nonno Papa-Re (in Italian). Milan.
- Ugolini, Romano (1972). "Perugia 1859 : l'ordine di saccheggio". Rassegna Storica del Risorgimento (in Italian) (fasc. III (juillet-septembre)).
- Whittier, John Greenleaf. From Perugia. Archived from the original on 2011-12-13.

== See also ==
- Papal States under Pope Pius IX
