= Papal States under Pope Pius IX =

Under Pope Pius IX, the Papal States assumed a much more modern and secular character than had been seen under previous pontificates, and yet this progressive modernization was not nearly sufficient in resisting the tide of political liberalization and unification in Italy during the middle of the 19th century.

A view of the Papal States from the perspective of the mid-19th century is readily available.

== Pius' internal administration ==
Pius IX was not only Pope, but until 1870 also the Sovereign Ruler of the Papal States. His rule was considered secular and as such he was occasionally accorded the title "king". However whether this was ever a title accepted by the Holy See is unclear. One of the most fervent contemporary critic of his infallibility dogma, Ignaz von Döllinger, considered the "political regime" of the pope in the Papal States as "wise, well-intentioned, mild-natured, frugal and open for innovations". Yet there was controversy. In the period before the 1848 revolution, Pius IX was a most ardent reformer. After the revolution however, his political reforms and constitutional improvements were considered minimalists, remaining largely within the framework of the 1850 laws mentioned above

=== Governmental structure ===
The governmental structure of the Papal States reflected the dual spiritual-secular character of the papacy at the time. The secular or lay persons were strongly in the majority with 6850 persons versus 300 members of the clergy. But the clergy occupied the key decision making positions and every job applicant had to present a character evaluation from his Parish priests in order to be considered.

The Cardinal Secretary of State appointed and dismissed ministers of which three were lay people. Their decisions were subject to papal approvals. They were ministers for: Internal Affairs including Police and Health; Commerce, including trade, crafts and industry, agriculture, arts, railways; War, including the papal army; Clemency and Justice including police and the judiciary.

=== Finance ===
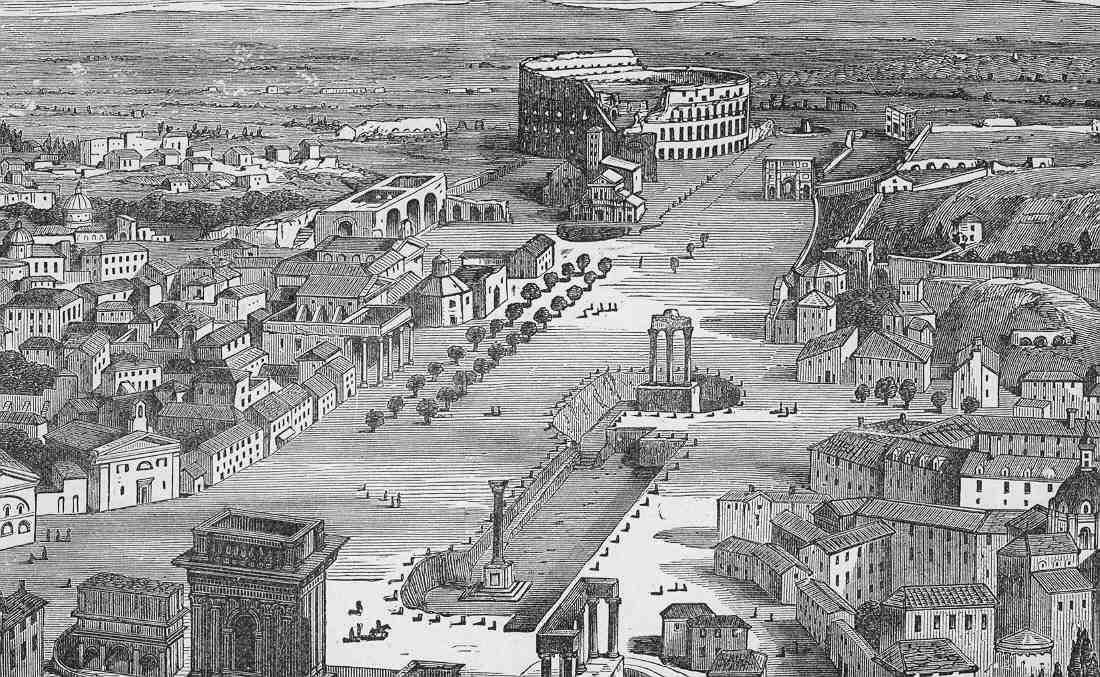
A view of the pastoral setting in the centre of Rome showing the Colosseum and Foro Romano around 1870

The financial administration in the Papal States under Pius IX were increasingly put in the hands of lay persons. The budget and financial administration in the Papal States had long been subject to criticism even before Pius IX, and did not end with his papacy. In 1850, he created a governmental finance congregation consisting of four lay persons with finance background for the twenty provinces. The chronic budget deficit disappeared by 1858. There was a steady increase in revenues stemming from the taxation of exports, imports and trade and a decrease in spending especially for the Papal army. The tax burden of the citizens was far below European average, which resulted in an influx of foreign residents into Rome, many of them non-Catholics, which created local problems with religious services and their integration. The papacy reacted with new consumption taxes for luxury items and beer, and an exemption from real estate taxes of low-cost houses for long-term residents. A problem after 1850 was the worthless paper money introduced by the revolutionary Republican government in 1848. It was accepted and exchanged at a lower value by the papal treasury.

The criticism of the economic policies of Pius IX included the argument that the Pope maintained in Rome large areas for agriculture and forestry at the expense of potential industrial development. Supporters of Pius point to the increases in agro-industry during his leadership, especially in the areas of silk, olive oil and wine production and great productivity gains in agriculture, accredited in part to a scientific research institute and benevolent taxation, which permitted refinancing of existing debts.

In 1866 the Papal States joined the new Latin Monetary Union, which resulted in the replacement of the old Roman scudo with the new Papal lira.

=== Commerce and trade ===
Pius IX is credited with systematic efforts to improve manufacturing and trade by giving advantages and papal prizes to domestic producers of wool, silk and other materials destined for export. He improved the transportation system by building roads, viaducts, bridges and sea ports. A series of new railway links connected the Papal States to northern Italy. It became soon visible that the Northern Italians were more adept to exploit economically the modern means of communication than the inhabitants in central and Southern Italy. A growing discrepancy of income developed poverty in the Papal States, which Pius IX tried to respond to with increased charities. This in turn made him subject to criticism of being too generous to lazy and apathetic populations, making them almost dependent on his social policies.

To increase commerce, Pius engaged in numerous and far-reaching agreements with neighbouring states but also with Belgium, United States, Russia, France, and Prussia to reduce mutual tariffs, equal treatment of commercial entities and ships from different states, crime fighting and postal conventions

=== Justice ===
The justice system of the Papal States was subject to numerous accusations at the time, not unlike the justice systems in the rest of Italy. There was a general lack of legal books and standards, and accusations of partiality of the judges. Throughout Italy but also in the Papal States, mafia-type criminal bands threatened commerce and travellers in several regions, engaging in robbery and murder at will. This problem, immortalized by Alessandro Manzoni's The Betrothed, and vividly described by the English Cardinal Nicholas Wiseman, existed long before Pius IX. In 1854 a reform was issued, intended to clarify jurisdiction. In 1859, Pius ordered the creation of a unified criminal code. He also ordered a reform of Papal prisons and penal houses. The police was put under the Secretary of State, and given more authority and power. This contributed to a significant reduction of crime but also to accusations of partiality.

=== Military ===
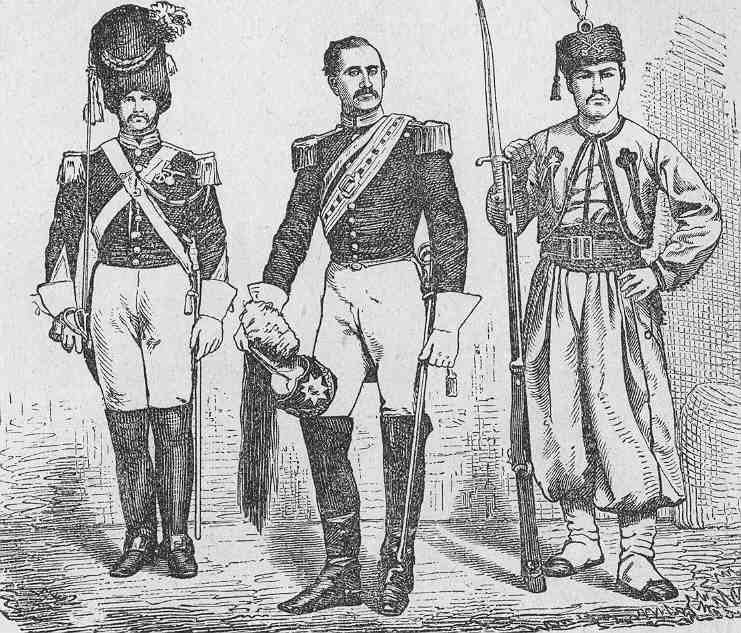
Papal soldiers around 1860

A unique position was granted to the Papal army, consisting almost exclusively of foreigners, since the Roman Black Nobility was not willing to serve and the population resisted military service as well, despite a decent salary structure and the potential for promotion. A main, but not the only, element of the Papal army was the Swiss Guard, there was also the Noble Guard, in which Pius IX had himself served as a young man. The number of papal soldiers amounted to 15.000 in 1859. The numerous nationalities presented linguistic problems, and their armament was not high on the priority list of Pius IX. Nonetheless in 1850 he ordered the creation of the Palatine Guard and in 1861 the Papal Zouaves, consisting of foreign Catholic volunteers in Papal service.

During much of his pontificate, the military security was guaranteed by either Austria or France. However, the Austrian and French troops did not always behave like model Christians, creating resentments in the local population and furthering the nationalistic tendencies towards a unified Italy, free of any foreigners.

=== Education ===
Liberals attacked Pius IX for his educational policies, which largely were a continuation of traditional Catholic education priorities with an accompanying neglect of the natural sciences on the primary and secondary level. Education was not mandatory in the Papal States, a fact which some attributed to the low educational standards in comparison to other countries. Secondary education was largely in private hands or in the control of Catholic institutes and religious orders. During his reign, Pius IX undertook innovative efforts: he created new schools for the handicapped and evening academies for persons to improve their education after working hours. He also created all-day schools for children whose parents were absent during the working hours. To improve the overall situation, he created a ministry of education in 1851.

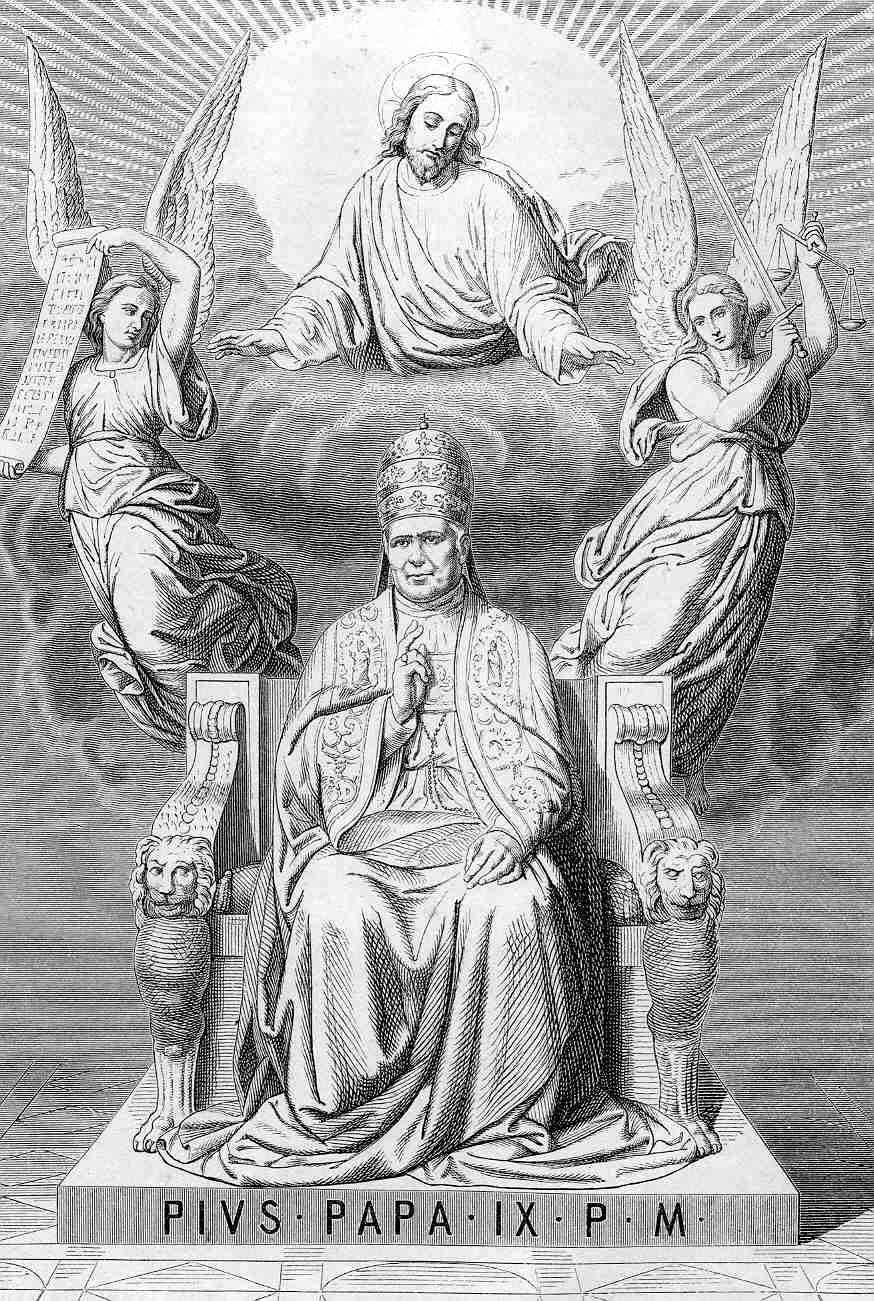
An hagiographic presentation of Pius IX from 1873

The two papal universities in Rome and Bologna suffered much from the revolutionary activities in 1848 but their standards in the areas of science, mathematics, philosophy and theology were considered adequate. Pius recognized that much had to be done and instituted a reform commission. He increased the powers of the Camerlengo and decided to personally appoint each head of the universities. He increased the salaries of the university staff, increased staff positions, and added geology, agriculture science, archaeology, astronomy, and botany to the teaching areas. He created a new clinic for pregnant women to give birth, several museums, and a Papal astronomical observatory Theology students were subjected to more rigorous training. Theology students from foreign countries benefited from his financial support of German, French, Polish, South American, North American, English, and Irish seminaries, where they could study together.

=== Social life ===
There was one newspaper Giornale di Roma and one periodical, La Civiltà Cattolica, run by Jesuits. When Marcantonio Pacelli, the grandfather of Eugenio Pacelli, approached Pius regarding an official newspaper, L’Osservatore Romano, which actually printed what the Pope said and did the previous day, Pius turned him down. Pacelli published anyway, and Leo XIII bought it from him a few years later. The social life of Rome centered around the Roman clergy and black nobility, their affairs and scandals. Outsiders, Protestants, and Jews, who came in ever increasing numbers into Rome, had little or no access to these inner circles. After the 1848 revolution, a sense of exclusion and of a lack of progress contributed to the development of an alternative societies, consisting of numerous secret associations, some looking for social change, some conspirative or revolutionary in nature, others aiming at Italian unity, all of which were not tolerated by the government of the Papal States, which saw them threaten the Papal theocracy.

=== Arts ===
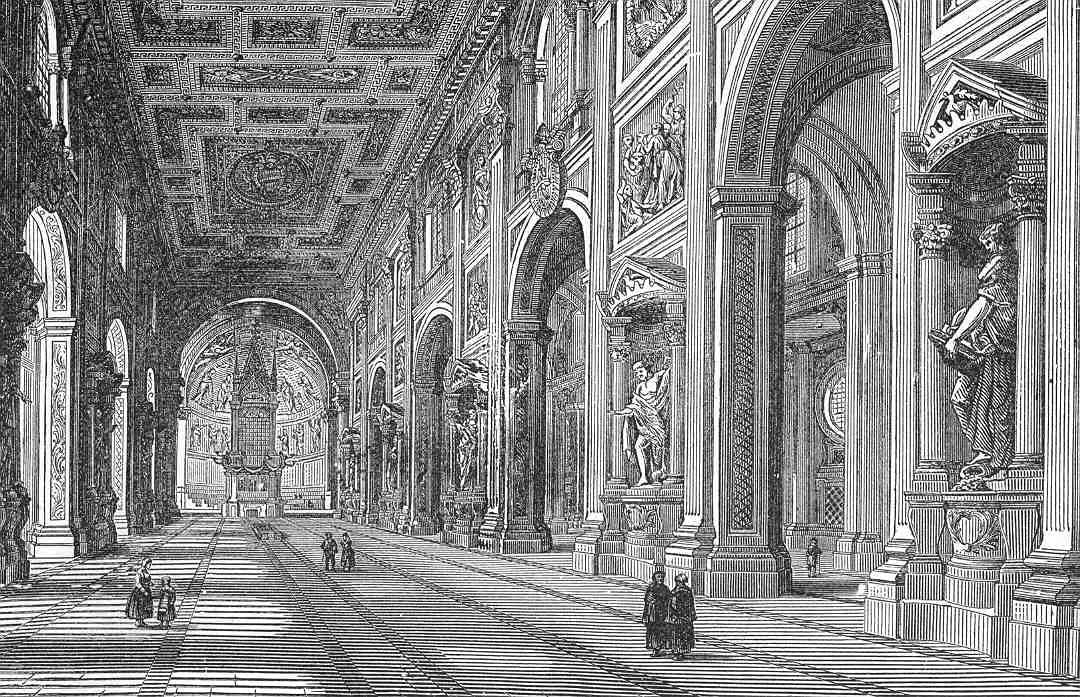
An 1870 view of the Lateran

Pius IX was a patron of the arts like most of his predecessors. The two theatres in Rome were popular in part because he exempted them from any papal censorship. He generously supported all expressions of art, architecture, painting, sculpture, music, goldsmiths, coppersmiths and more, and handed out numerous rewards to its representatives. Much of his efforts were oriented to the Roman churches but also in the Papal States, many of which were renovated and improved. Saint Peter's Basilica got numerous improvements, including the existing marble floors and the two statues of the Apostle Peter and Apostle Paul at Saint Peter's Square. He restored profane buildings as well and ordered a renovation of the paintings in the Vatican. He greatly increased the Vatican Library and added to the Vatican manufacturing a new factory for mosaics. The Papal ministries were ordered to relocate into the centrally located Palazzo della Cancelleria to enable regular citizens access to papal officials.

Great efforts were undertaken to restore historic walls, fountains, streets and bridges. He ordered the excavation of Roman sites, which led to several major discoveries. He ordered the strengthening of the Colosseum which was threatening to collapse at the time. Huge sums were spent in the discovery of Christian Catacombs of Rome, for which Pius created a new archaeological commission in 1853. A major success during his pontificate was the discoveries of the Catacombs of San Callisto, which included totally unknown tombs, texts and paintings. Outside of Rome, Pius restored Etruscan and ancient Roman monuments in Perugia, Ostia, Benevento, Ancona and Ravenna

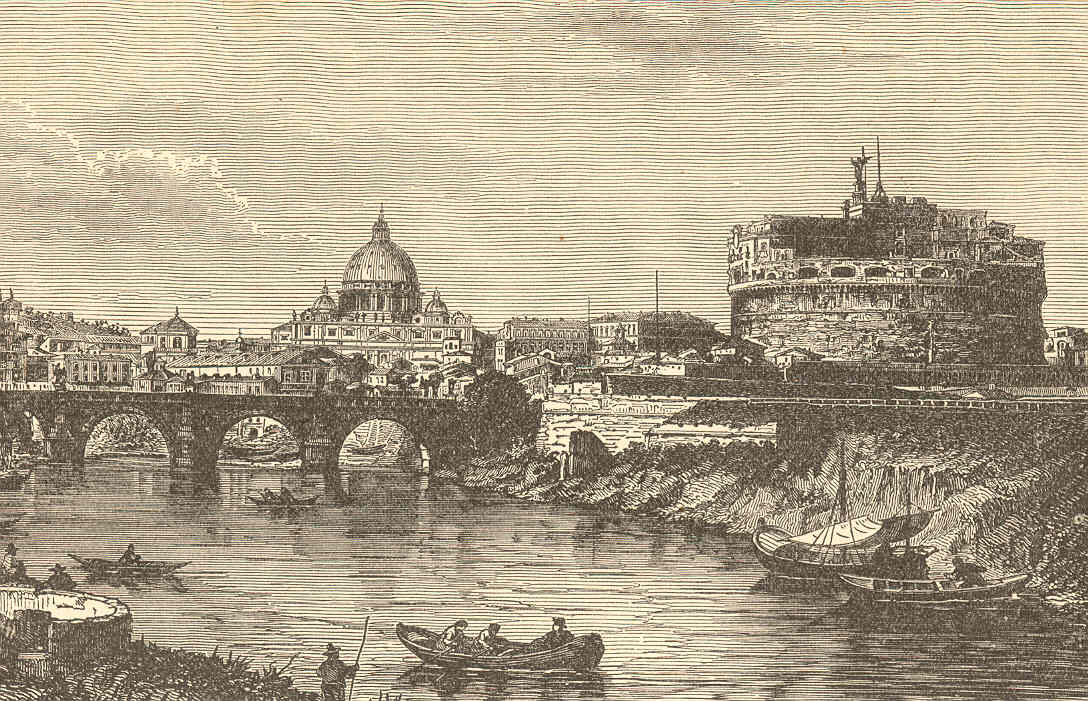
An 1870 view of Saint Peter's

=== Protestants and Jews ===
The Papal States were a theocracy in which the Catholic Church and Catholics had more rights than members of other religions. Pius IX's policies changed over time. At the beginning of his pontificate, together with other liberal measures, Pius opened the Jewish ghetto in Rome. After returning from exile in 1850, during which the Roman Republic issued sharp anti-Church measures, the Pope issued a series of anti-liberal measures, including re-instituting the Ghetto.

In 1858, in a highly publicized case, a six-year-old Jewish boy, Edgardo Mortara, was taken from his parents by the police of the Papal States. He had reportedly been baptized by a Christian servant girl of the family while he was ill, because she feared that otherwise he would go to Hell if he died. At that time, the law did not permit Christians to be raised by Jews, even their own parents. Pius IX steadfastly refused "to extradite a soul". Calls to return the child to his parents, from The Times, numerous heads of state including Emperor Franz Josef of Austria-Hungary and Emperor Napoleon III of France and Ambassador Gramont, were politely rejected.

== Foreign relations and effects of Italian unification ==
=== Rising tide of Italian nationalism ===
Italian nationalism had been stoked during the Napoleonic period but dashed by the settlement of the Congress of Vienna (1814–15), which left Italy divided and largely under Habsburg Austrian domination. In 1848, nationalist and liberal revolutions began to break out across Europe; in 1849, a Roman Republic was declared and Pope Pius IX fled the city. Louis Napoleon Bonaparte, recently elected president of the newly declared French Second Republic, saw an opportunity to assuage conservative Catholic opinion in France, and in cooperation with Austria sent troops to restore Papal rule in Rome. After some hard fighting (in which Giuseppe Garibaldi distinguished himself on the Italian side), Pius was returned to Rome, and repenting of his previous liberal tendencies pursued a harsh, conservative policy even more repressive than that of his predecessors. However, Pius did continue to build railroads, telegraphs, and gas lights. Papal troops suppressed the 1859 Perugia uprising.

=== Pressures from Sardinia and Savoy ===
In the years that followed, Italian nationalists – both those who wished to unify the country under the Kingdom of Sardinia and its ruling House of Savoy and those who favored a republican solution – saw the Papal States as the chief obstacle to Italian unity. Louis Napoleon, who had now seized control of France as Emperor Napoleon III, tried to play a double game, simultaneously forming an alliance with Sardinia, playing on his famous uncle's nationalist credentials on the one hand and maintaining French troops in Rome to protect the Pope's rights on the other.

=== Second Italian War of Independence ===
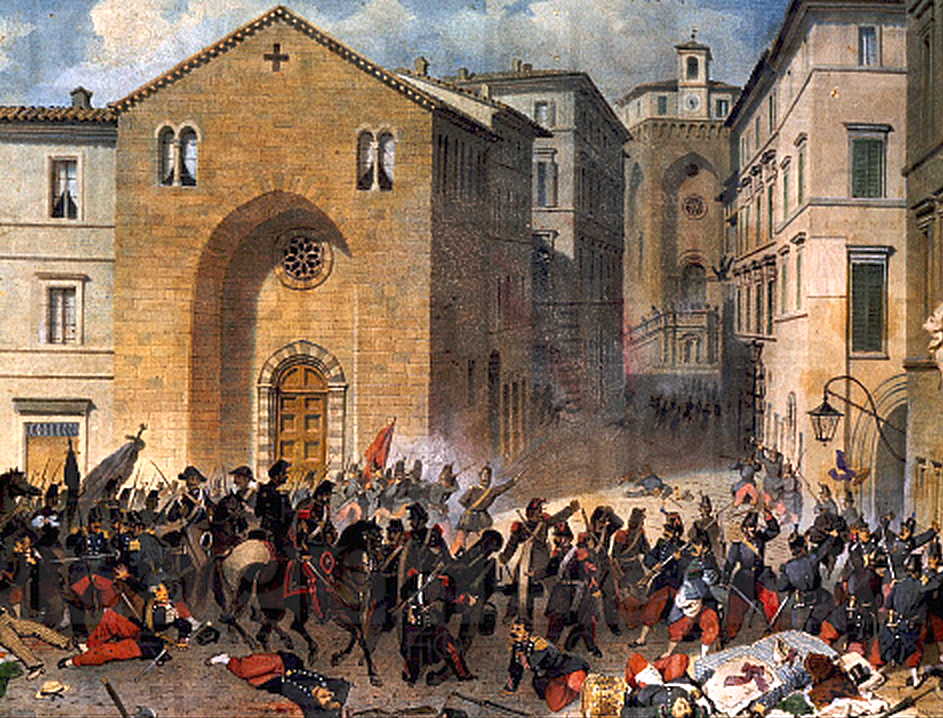
Regiments of the Swiss Guard attacking rebels in 1859

After the Second Italian War of Independence, much of northern Italy was unified under the House of Savoy's government; in the aftermath, Garibaldi's expedition of the Thousand overthrew the Bourbon monarchy in the Kingdom of the Two Sicilies. Afraid that Garibaldi would set up a republican government in the south, the Sardinians petitioned Napoleon for permission to send troops through the Papal States to gain control of the Two Sicilies, which was granted on the condition that Rome was left undisturbed. In 1860, with much of the region already in rebellion against Papal rule, Sardinia conquered the eastern two-thirds of the Papal States and cemented its hold on the south. Bologna, Ferrara, Umbria, the Marches, Benevento and Pontecorvo were all formally annexed by November of the same year, and a unified Kingdom of Italy was declared. The Papal States were reduced to the Latium region surrounding Rome, raising the Roman Question.

=== Rome declared capital of Italy ===
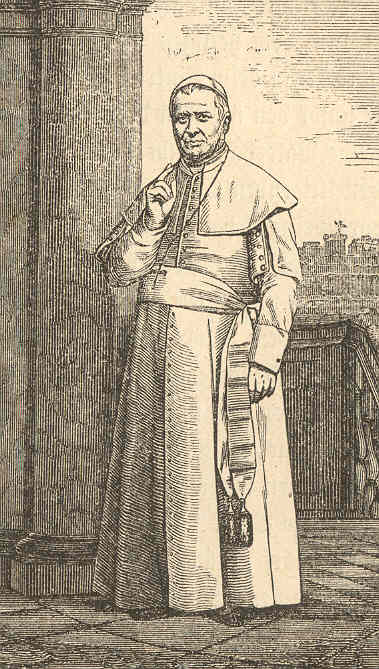
Pope Pius IX, under whose rule the Papal States passed into secular control

Rome was declared the capital of the new Kingdom of Italy in March 1861, when the first Italian Parliament met in the kingdom's old capital Turin in Piedmont. However, the Italian Government could not take possession of its capital, because Napoleon III kept a French garrison in Rome protecting Pope Pius IX. By the September Convention of 1864, Napoleon III agreed to withdraw French forces from Rome in return for Italy respecting the borders of the rump Papal States and moving its capital to Florence. French forces were withdrawn by 1866, but their absence encouraged Garibaldi to launch a renewed attempt to take Rome and French troops returned, defeating Garibaldi's expedition at the Battle of Mentana. The opportunity to eliminate the last vestige of the Papal States came when the Franco-Prussian War began in July 1870. Emperor Napoleon III had to recall his garrison from Rome for France's own defence and could no longer protect the pope, following the collapse of the Second French Empire at the Battle of Sedan.

=== Garibaldi's struggle against the papacy ===
After the defeat of Napoleon III at Sedan, Garibaldi went to France and assumed command of the Army of the Vosges, an army of volunteers that was never defeated by the Germans (see Giuseppe Garibaldi). widespread public demonstrations demanded that the Italian Government take Rome. King Victor Emmanuel II sent Count Gustavo Ponza di San Martino to Pius IX with a personal letter offering a face-saving proposal that would have allowed the peaceful entry of the Royal Italian Army into Rome, under the guise of offering protection to the pope.

The Pope’s reception of San Martino (10 September 1870) was unfriendly. Pius IX allowed violent outbursts to escape him. Throwing the King’s letter upon the table he exclaimed: "Fine loyalty! You are all a set of vipers, of whited sepulchres, and wanting in faith." He was perhaps alluding to other letters received from the King. Later, growing calmer, he exclaimed: "I am no prophet, nor son of a prophet, but I tell you, you will never enter Rome!" San Martino was so mortified (or was aware of the impending hostilities) that he left the next day.

=== Military resistance to Italy ===
On September 10, Italy declared war on the Papal States, and the Italian Army, commanded by General Raffaele Cadorna, crossed the papal frontier on 11 September and advanced slowly toward Rome, hoping that a peaceful entry could be negotiated. The Italian Army reached the Aurelian Walls on 19 September and placed Rome under a state of siege. Although the pope's tiny army was incapable of defending the city, Pius IX ordered it to put up at least a token resistance to emphasize that Italy was acquiring Rome by force and not consent. The city was captured on 20 September 1870. Rome and Latium were annexed to the Kingdom of Italy after a plebiscite held in the following October.

=== Capture of Rome ===
This event, described in Italian history books as a liberation, was taken very bitterly by the Pope. The Italian government had offered to allow the Pope to retain control of the Leonine City on the west bank of the Tiber, but Pius rejected the overture. Early the following year, the capital of Italy was moved from Florence to Rome and the Italian parliament passed the Law of Guarantees, which the Pope also did not accept. The Pope, whose previous residence, the Quirinal Palace, had become the royal palace of the kings of Italy, withdrew in protest into the Vatican, where he lived as a self-proclaimed "prisoner", refusing to leave or to set foot in St. Peter's Square, and forbidding (Non Expedit) Catholics on pain of excommunication to participate in elections in the new Italian state, an action which effectively guaranteed that only persons hostile to the Catholic Church would be involved in the new government.

=== Prisoner of the Vatican ===
In 1929, the papacy – then under Pope Pius XI – renounced its claim to the Papal States and signed with Italy the Lateran Treaty, which created the independent state of Vatican City, "under the sovereignty of the Supreme Pontiff".

== Sources ==
- Pougeois, Histoire de Pie IX, son pontificat et son siecle. Vols I-VI, Paris, 1877.
- Schmidlin, Josef, Papstgeschichte. Vols I-IV, Köstel-Pusztet München, 1922-1939.
