= Revolutions of 1848 in the Italian states =

- Part of the Revolutions of 1848 and the First Italian War of Independence
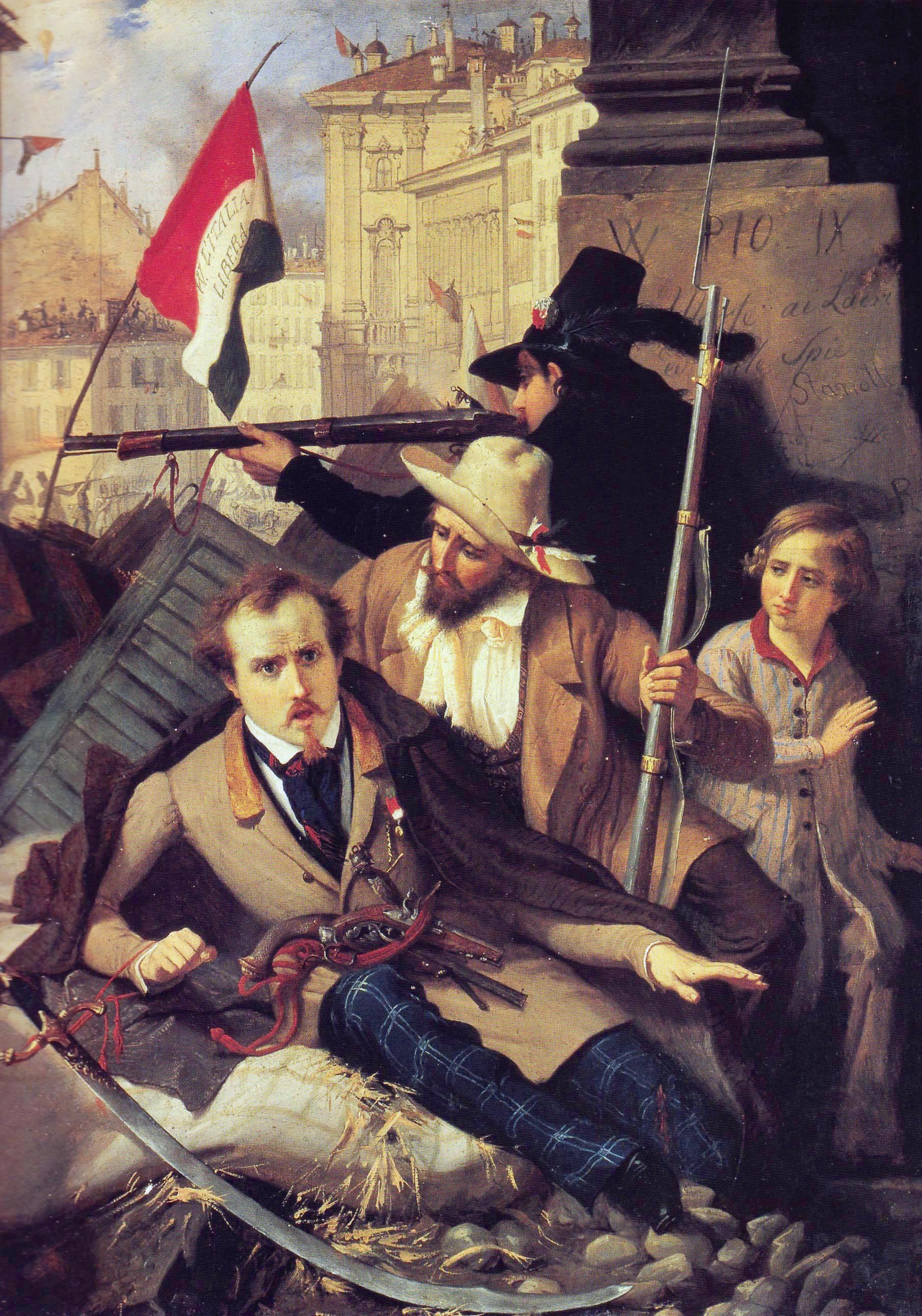
- Episode from the Five Days of Milan, painting by Baldassare Verazzi
Date	12 January – 27 October 1848 (9 months, 2 weeks and 1 day)
Location	Italy
Result	Revolutions fail; some insurgent states obtain liberal constitutions, but they are all soon abolished with the exception of that of the Kingdom of Sardinia (Albertine Statute).

Belligerents
Kingdom of Sicily; Provisional Government of Milan; Republic of San Marco; Roman Republic; Supported by: Kingdom of Sardinia	Austrian Empire; Kingdom of Two Sicilies; Papal States; Grand Duchy of Tuscany

Commanders and leaders
Ruggero Settimo; Carlo Cattaneo; Daniele Manin; Giuseppe Mazzini	(Austrian Empire) Josef Radetzky; Carlo Filangieri; Charles Oudinot

The revolutions of 1848 in the Italian states, part of the wider revolutions of 1848 in Europe, were organized revolts in the states of the Italian Peninsula and Sicily, led by intellectuals and agitators who desired a liberal government. As Italian nationalists they sought to eliminate reactionary Austrian control. During this time, Italy was not a unified country, and was divided into many states, which, in Northern Italy, were ruled directly or indirectly by the Austrian Empire. A desire to be independent from foreign rule, and the conservative leadership of the Austrians, led Italian revolutionaries to stage revolution in order to drive out the Austrians. The revolution was led by the state of the Kingdom of Sardinia. Some uprisings in the Kingdom of Lombardy–Venetia, particularly in Milan, forced the Austrian General Radetzky to retreat to the Quadrilateral fortresses.

King Charles Albert, who ruled Piedmont-Sardinia from 1831 to 1849, aspired to unite Italy with the endorsement of Pope Pius IX, head of the Papal States, which comprised a large territory in the center of the Italian Peninsula. He declared war on Austria in March 1848 and launched a full-out attack on the Quadrilateral. Lacking allies, Charles Albert was no match for the Austrian army and was defeated at the Battle of Custoza on 24 July 1848. He signed a truce and withdrew his forces from Lombardy, and thus Austria remained dominant in a divided Italy until the Second Italian War of Independence.

== The rebellion ==
An image of divided Italy (1815-1870)

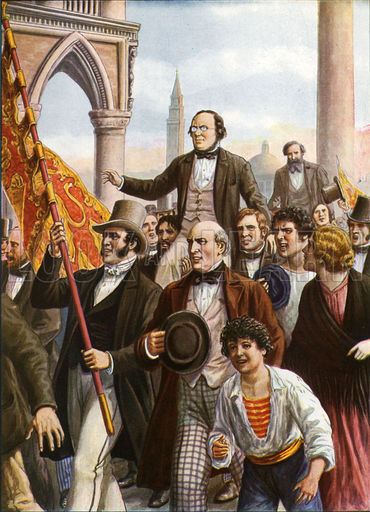
Daniele Manin and Niccolo Tommaseo are freed from prison, 18 March 1848

After witnessing the liberal friendly events that were occurring in Rome, the people of other states started to demand similar treatment. It commenced on 12 January in Sicily, where the people began to demand a Provisional Government, separate from the government of the mainland. King Ferdinand II tried to resist these changes; however, a full-fledged revolt erupted in Sicily and a revolt also erupted in Salerno and Naples. These revolts drove Ferdinand and his army out of Sicily, and forced him to allow a provisional government to be constituted. During those months, the constitution was quite advanced for its time in liberal democratic terms, as was the proposal of a unified Italian confederation of states. The revolt's failure was reversed 12 years later as the Bourbon Kingdom of the Two Sicilies collapsed in 1860–61 with the unification of Italy.

On 11 February 1848, Leopold II of Tuscany, first cousin of Emperor Ferdinand I of Austria, granted the Constitution, with the general approval of his subjects. The Habsburg example was followed by Charles Albert of Sardinia (Albertine Statute; later became the constitution of the unified Kingdom of Italy and remained in force, with changes, until 1948) and by Pope Pius IX (Fundamental Statute). However, only King Charles Albert maintained the statute even after the end of the riots.

Notwithstanding the events in Rome and Naples, the states still were under a conservative rule. Italians in Lombardy-Venetia could not enjoy these freedoms. The Austrian Empire of this region had tightened their grip on the people by further oppressing them with harsher taxes. Tax gatherers were sent out along with the 100,000 man army standing in place, and letting their presence be known.

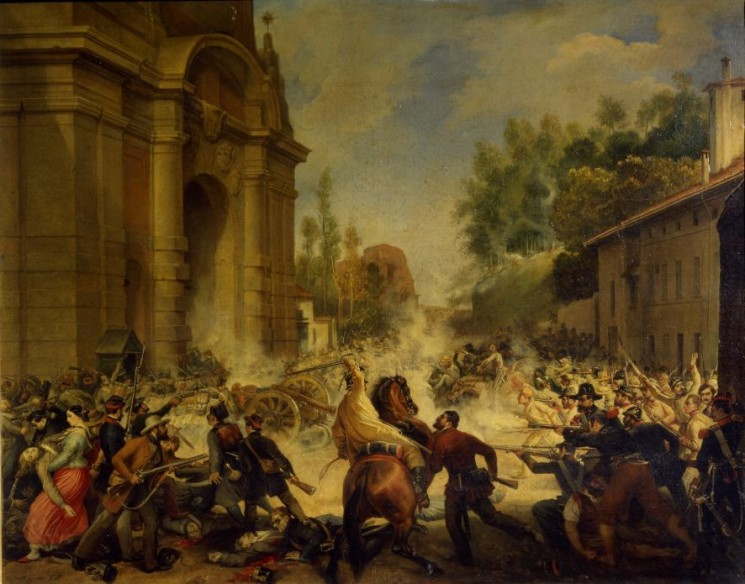
Clashes between rebels and Austrians in Bologna.

These revolts in Sicily helped to spark revolts in the northern Kingdom of Lombardy–Venetia. Revolutions in the Lombard city of Milan, which marked the beginning of the First Italian War of Independence, forced about 20,000 of Austrian General Radetsky's troops to withdraw from the city. Eventually General Radetsky was forced to completely withdraw his troops from the two states, however, with his expertise, he was able to keep the Quadrilateral fortresses of Verona, Peschiera, Legnago and Mantua. Through his skillful tactics he brought his men that had been withdrawn into the key forts. Meanwhile, the Italian insurgents were encouraged when news of Prince Metternich's resignation in Vienna spread, but were unable to completely eject Radetsky's troops.

In the Quadrilateral General Radetsky and his men were plotting a counterattack in order to regain their lost ground. However, they were interrupted by Charles Albert, who had by then taken the forefront of the attack, and had launched an attack against the Quadrilateral. Charles Albert charged the fortress from all sides aided by 25,000 reinforcements, who came in assistance of the nationalist cause. While journeying to the fortress preparing for the attack, Charles Albert garnered the support of princes of other states. His fellow princes responded by sending reinforcements to his aid: Leopold II, Grand Duke of Tuscany sent 8,000, Pope Pius contributed 10,000, and Ferdinand II sent 16,050 men on the advice of general Guglielmo Pepe. They attacked the fortresses and on 3 May 1848 succeeded in winning the Battle of Goito and capturing the fortress of Peschiera.

At that point, Pope Pius IX became nervous about defeating the Austrian Empire and withdrew his troops, citing that he could not endorse a war between two Catholic nations. King Ferdinand of the Two Sicilies also called his soldiers back. However, some of them did not comply with the order and continued on under the guidance of Generals Pepe, Durando and Giovanni until defeat at the Battle of Custoza. An armistice was agreed to, and Radetzky regained control of all of Lombardy–Venetia save Venice itself, where the Republic of San Marco was proclaimed under Daniele Manin. A year later, Charles Albert launched another attack, but, due to the lack of troops, he was defeated in the Battle of Novara.

In the Duchy of Modena and Reggio, Duke Francis V attempted to respond militarily to the first attempts at armed revolt, but faced with the approach of Bolognese volunteers to support the insurgents, in order to avoid bloodshed he preferred to leave the city promising a constitution and amnesties. On 21 March 1848 he left for Bolzano. A provisional government was established in Modena. The municipalities of Menton and Roquebrune, at the time part of the Principality of Monaco, united and obtained independence as the Free Cities of Menton and Roquebrune.

== Aftermath ==
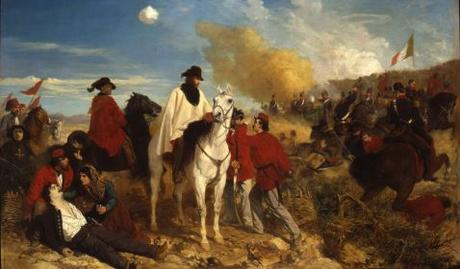
Giuseppe Garibaldi in Rome.

Despite the fact that Pius had abandoned the war against the Austrians, many of his people had still fought alongside Charles Albert. The people of Rome rebelled against Pius' government and assassinated Pellegrino Rossi, Pius' minister. Pope Pius IX then fled to the fortress of Gaeta, under the protection of King Ferdinand II. In February 1849, he was joined by Leopold II, Grand Duke of Tuscany, fleeing the radical democrats who set up the short-lived Tuscan Republic (1849). Piedmont was also defeated by the Austrians in 1849 and Charles Albert had to abdicate leaving his son, Victor Emmanuel II, to rule.

In Rome, the authority that did take over passed popular legislation to eliminate burdensome taxes and give work to the unemployed. Giuseppe Garibaldi and Giuseppe Mazzini came to build a "Rome of the People," and the short-lived Roman Republic was proclaimed. The republic aimed to inspire the people to build an independent Italian nation. It also attempted to improve economically the lives of the underserved by giving some of the Church's large landholdings to poor peasants. It also made prison and insane asylum reforms, gave freedom to the press, provided secular education, but shied away from the "Right to Work", having seen this fail in France.

However, the many reforms instituted by the new Republic combined with its lowering of taxes brought about monetary problems which the republic then compounded by simply printing more money. Runaway price inflation doomed the economy of the republic. In addition sending troops to defend Piedmont from Austrian forces put Rome at risk of attack from Austria. Moreover, Pope Pius appealed to Louis Napoleon for help in restoring his temporal power. The French President saw this as an opportunity to gain Catholic support. The French army arrived by sea under the command of General Charles Oudinot, and, despite an early loss to Garibaldi, the French, with the help of the Austrians, eventually defeated the Roman Republic. On July 12, 1849 Pope Pius IX was escorted back into Rome and ruled under French protection until 1870.

== Riots and the Italian tricolour ==
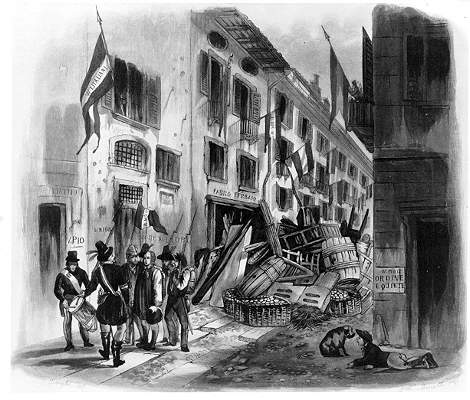
The Five Days of Milan (1848), of which one of the symbols was the Italian tricolour

The Italian tricolour flag was a symbol of the revolutions of 1848. In March 1848, the Five Days of Milan, an armed insurrection which led to the temporary liberation of the city from Austrian rule, were characterised by a profusion of flags and Italian tricolour cockades. On 20 March, during furious fighting, with the Austrians barricaded in the Castello Sforzesco and within the defensive systems of the city walls, the patriots Luigi Torelli and Scipione Bagaggia managed to climb on the roof of the Milan Cathedral and hoist the Italian flag on the highest spire of the church, the one on which the Madonnina stands. At the moment of the appearance of the Italian tricolour on the spire of the Madonnina, the crowd below greeted the event with a series of enthusiastic "Hurray!" This historic flag is kept inside the Museum of the Risorgimento in Milan. The patriot Luciano Manara then managed to hoist the Italian tricolour, amidst the Austrian artillery shots, on the top of Porta Tosa. The abandonment of the city by the Austrian troops of field marshal Josef Radetzky, on 22 March, determined the immediate establishment of the provisional government of Milan chaired by the podestà Gabrio Casati, who issued a proclamation that read:

Let's get it over with once with any foreign domination in Italy. Embrace this tricolour flag that flies over the country for your valour and swear never to let it tear again. (Note: Facciamola finita una volta con qualunque dominazione straniera in Italia. Abbracciate questa bandiera tricolore che pel valor vostro sventola sul Paese e giurate di non lasciarvela strappare mai più.)

— Gabrio Casati

The process of transforming the flag of Italy into one of the Italian national symbols was completed, definitively consolidating itself, during the Milanese uprisings.

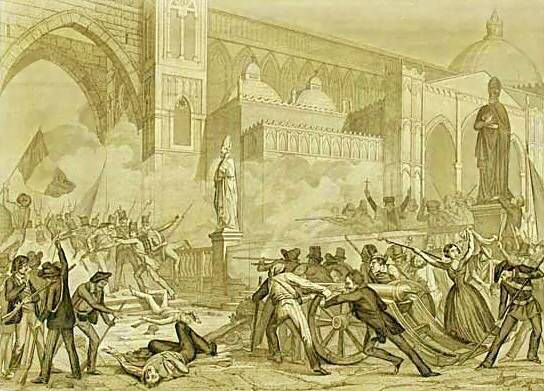
The Sicilian revolution of 1848, which was characterised by a wide use of the Italian tricolour

The following day King Charles Albert of Piedmont-Sardinia assured the provisional government of Milan that his troops, ready to come to his aid by starting the First Italian War of Independence, would use an Italian tricolour defaced with the Savoyan coat of arms superimposed on the white as a war flag. In his proclamation to the Lombard–Venetian people, Charles Albert said:

"In order to show more clearly with exterior signs the commitment to Italian unification, we want that Our troops ... have the Savoy shield placed on the Italian tricolour flag. (Note: Per viemmeglio dimostrare con segni esteriori il sentimento dell'unione italiana, vogliamo che le nostre truppe, entrando nel territorio della Lombardia e della Venezia, portino lo Scudo di Savoia sovrapposto alla bandiera tricolore italiana)

— Charles Albert of Piedmont-Sardinia

As the arms, blazoned gules a cross argent, mixed with the white of the flag, it was fimbriated azure, blue being the dynastic colour, although this does not conform to the heraldic rule of tincture. The rectangular civil and state variants were adopted in 1851.

A makeshift Italian tricolour consisting of redshirts, green displays and a white sheet was hoisted on the flagpole of the ship that brought Giuseppe Garibaldi back to Italy from South America shortly after the outbreak of the First Italian War of Independence. The patriots who had gathered at the port of Genoa to welcome her return gave Anita Garibaldi, in front of 3,000 people, an Italian tricolour to be given to Giuseppe Garibaldi so that he could plant it on Lombard soil.

The Grand Duchy of Tuscany in the act of granting the constitution (17 February 1848) did not change the national banner ("The State retains its flag and its colours") but later granted the Tuscan militias, by decree, the use of an Italian tricolour scarf next to the symbols of the Grand Duchy (25 March 1848). The Grand Duke, following the pressure of the Tuscan patriots, then adopted the Italian tricolour flag also as a state banner and as a military banner for the troops sent to help Charles Albert of Piedmont-Sardinia. Similar measures were adopted by the Duchy of Parma and Piacenza and by the Duchy of Modena and Reggio.

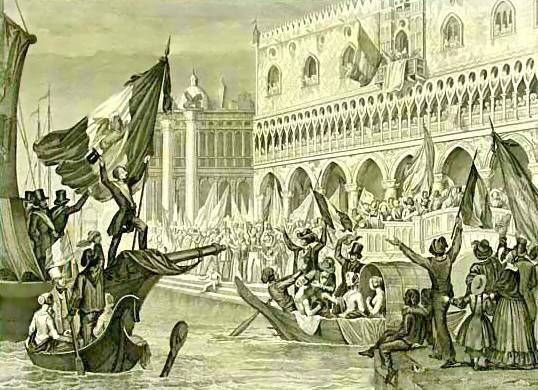
The proclamation the Republic of San Marco in Venice (1848), event that was characterised by a waving of Italian tricolour flags

The flag of the Constitutional Kingdom of the Two Sicilies, a white field charged with the coats of arms of Castile, Leon, Aragon, Two Sicilies, and Granada, was modified by Ferdinand II through the addition of a red and green border. This flag lasted from 3 April 1848 until 19 May 1849. The Provisional Government of Sicily, which lasted from 12 January 1848 to 15 May 1849 during the Sicilian Revolution, adopted the Italian tricolour, defaced with the trinacria, or triskelion.

The Republic of San Marco, proclaimed independent in 1848 by the Austrian Empire, also adopted the Italian tricolour. The flags that they adopted marked the link to Italian independence and unification efforts. The former, the Italian tricolour undefaced, and the latter, charged with the winged lion of St. Mark, from the flag of the Republic of Venice (maritime republic which existed from 697 AD until 1797 AD), on a white canton. A chronicler of the time described the final moments of the subsequent capitulation of the Republic of San Marco by the Austrian troops, which took place on 22 August 1849:

The tricolour flags waved above every work, in every danger, and because the enemy balls not only tore up the silk, but broke the stick, it was immediately found who at great risk was going to replace another. (Note: Le bandiere tricolori sventolavano sopra ogni opera, in ogni pericolo, e perché le palle nemiche non solo ne stracciavano la seta, ma rompevano il bastone, si trovava subito chi a gran rischio andava a sostituirne un'altra.)

— Chronicler witnessing the last hours of the Republic of San Marco

The Italian tricolour flag of 1848 that greeted the expulsion of the Austrians from Venice is kept in the Museum of the Risorgimento and the Venetian 19th century.

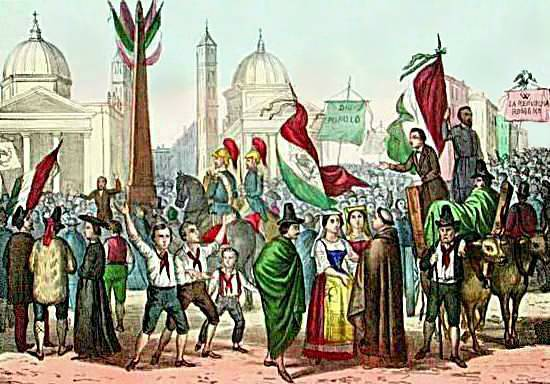
The proclamation of the Roman Republic in Piazza del Popolo (1848) in Rome among a profusion of Italian tricolour flags

In 1849, the Roman Republic, formed following the revolt against the Papal State that dethroned the Pope, adopted as its national banner a green, white and red flag with a republican Roman eagle at the tip of the pole. This lasted for four months, while the Papal States of the Church was in abeyance. The Roman Republic resisted until 4 July 1849, when it was capitulated by the French Army. The troops from beyond the Alps, as a last act, entered the municipality of Rome where the last members of the republican assembly not yet captured were barricaded. Their secretary Quirico Filopanti surrendered wearing an Italian tricolour scarf.

The Italian tricolour also flew over the barricades of the Ten Days of Brescia, a revolt of the citizens of the Lombard city against the Austrian Empire, and in many other centres such as Varese, Gallarate, Como, Melegnano, Cremona, Monza, Udine, Trento, Verona, Rovigo, Vicenza, Belluno and Padua. This spread throughout the Italian peninsula and demonstrated that the Italian tricolour flag had by then assumed a consolidated symbolism valid throughout the national territory. The iconography of the Italian flag then began to spread not only in the vexillological and military fields, but also in some everyday objects such as scarves and clothing fabrics.

== See also ==
- Bourgeois revolution
- List of revolutions and rebellions
  - List of rebellions in the Habsburg monarchy
- Milan Uprising
- Revolt of Genoa
- Revolutions of 1848
- Revolutionary Spring: Fighting for a New World 1848–1849 by Christopher Clark
- Unification of Italy
