= Monument to the Five Days of Milan =

Coordinates: 45.46227°N 9.20712°E

- Monumento alle Cinque Giornate di Milano
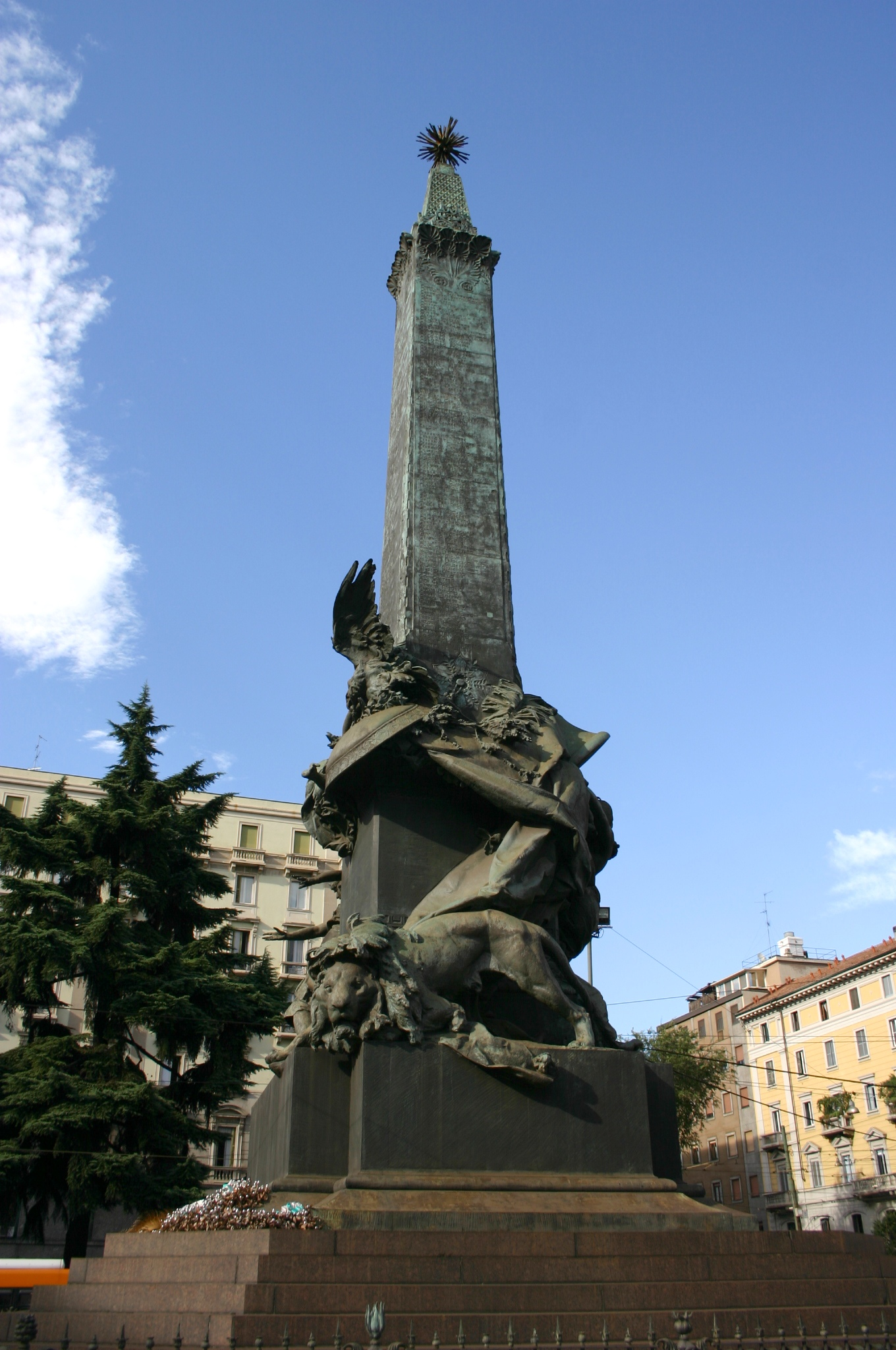
- Interactive map of Monument to the Five Days of Milan
- Location: Piazza Cinque Giornate, Milan, Italy
- Designer: Giuseppe Grandi
- Type: Obelisk, sculptures
- Material: Bronze
- Height: 23 metres (75 ft)
- Dedicated date: 1895
- Dedicated to: The Five Days of Milan

The Monument to the Five Days of Milan (Italian: Monumento alle Cinque Giornate di Milano) is a monument comprising a bronze obelisk and sculptures on a plinth located in the center of Piazza Cinque Giornate in Milan, Italy. The monument was created by Italian sculptor Giuseppe Grandi and inaugurated in 1895 to commemorate the Five Days of Milan, a rebellion of 18–22 March 1848 which caused the Austrian army to withdraw from Milan. In this site, once rose the Porta Vittoria (formerly Porta Tosa), the eastern gate in the Medieval Spanish Walls of Milan, whose capture by the rebellion prompted the Austrians to abandon the city.

== Commission of Monument ==
Temporary monuments had been dedicated in 1848 to honor those who died during the recent events of 1848, but these soon were removed by the authorities after the restitution of Hapsburg rule. In 1862, the local Academy of Fine Arts sponsored a contest for a monument to decorate the town gate at this spot, but this effort failed to lead to construction. In 1872–73, a number of public subscriptions were started to fund monuments celebrating events related to 1848 and 1860 that lead to an Italian kingdom.

In 1879, two decades after the union of Lombardy to the Kingdom of Italy, with the funds collected from this plan the city of Milan sponsored a competition to erect a memorial to the events of the Cinque Giornate. Nearly 100 projects were submitted, and a project by Luca Beltrami was selected in 1880, however, it was not approved by the Commune, and a second contest was held, this time requesting designs for a triumphal arch. The assigned funds were for 500 thousand Lire. Eighty-two proposals were submitted, and the design by Grandi was selected, even though it did not meet the specified request. With a sketch of his proposal, Grandi indicated that he:

intended to plastically represent the glorious drama of the Milanese revolution. From the first sign of the fight, represented by a figure who climbs up to strike the bell, the fight takes place in its two aspects of combative enthusiasm and breathless anxiety, represented by the woman who shouts showing the bundles of weapons, and by the other one crying while crouching. Victory arises from the struggle, and Fame, voices the triumphs spreading them to the world. The drama culminates in a sort of apotheosis of national redemption, personified in the eagle representing the great idea, and in the lion proudly planted in defense of the barricades, which were the main forum for the battles. With these brief notes, the artist intends only to indicate and summarize the ideas that guided him in imagining his sketch. Words are insufficient to express with the necessary effectiveness and evidence what is essentially done for the eye. The concepts which, due to the very nature and limits of a sketch, were only hinted at, can, where the author is granted the execution of the work, be developed and expressed with all the eloquence that the representation requires of this great and glorious epic

Grandi took thirteen years, longer than expected, to complete the work. It proved a challenge to the foundries to work a bronze monument of this size. He established a studio near the monument's location. The monument was finally inaugurated in March 1895; the sculptor had passes away a few days before.

== Description of monument ==
The monument is in a small park surrounded by busy traffic of cars and trolleys. It is protected by a low fence, and standing atop a low stone plinth consisting of a rise of stairs made with reddish Swedish granite. Atop the stone at the base is a swirl of Statuary, consisting mostly of women, an eagle and a lion. The statues are allegories of different days of the rebellion. Atop rises a 23 meter obelisk, inscribed with the names of nearly 100 martyrs, crowned by a stellate pinnacle. The work was considered novel and unconventional. In 1900, Rollins Willard criticized the work as

more like a half-grasped idea, seen in a dream, than like a clearcut perception recorded on an intellect thoroughly awake. Around the base of the obelisk there is a sort of whirling vortex of objects which in one way or another convey the idea of Revolution, symbolically as we look at them separately, and in a certain tangible, literal sense as we take in the suggestion of vertiginous motion given by the sweeping lines. Among the various elements in the composition we can make out a bell, evidently in vibration, a lion crawling along with catlike stealthiness, several figures of not perfectly luminous import, and some irregular folds of drapery intended to serve as a modulation or a connecting rhythm from one idea to the other. Evidently this conception came hot to Grandi's mind, was fastened in the bozzetto before it was allowed to cool, and was never substantially changed afterward.

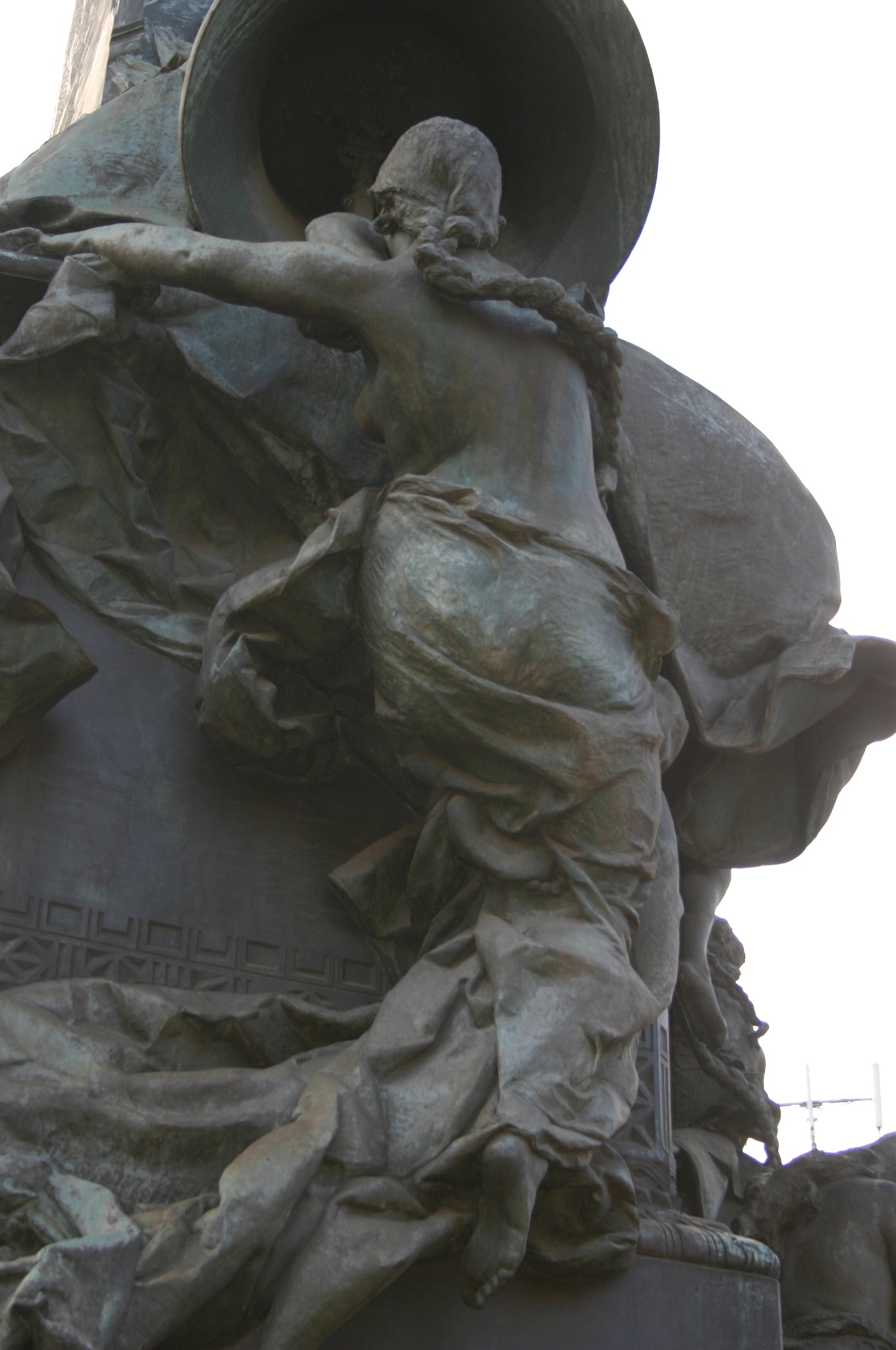
Day 1: Ringing the bell to call the city to arms

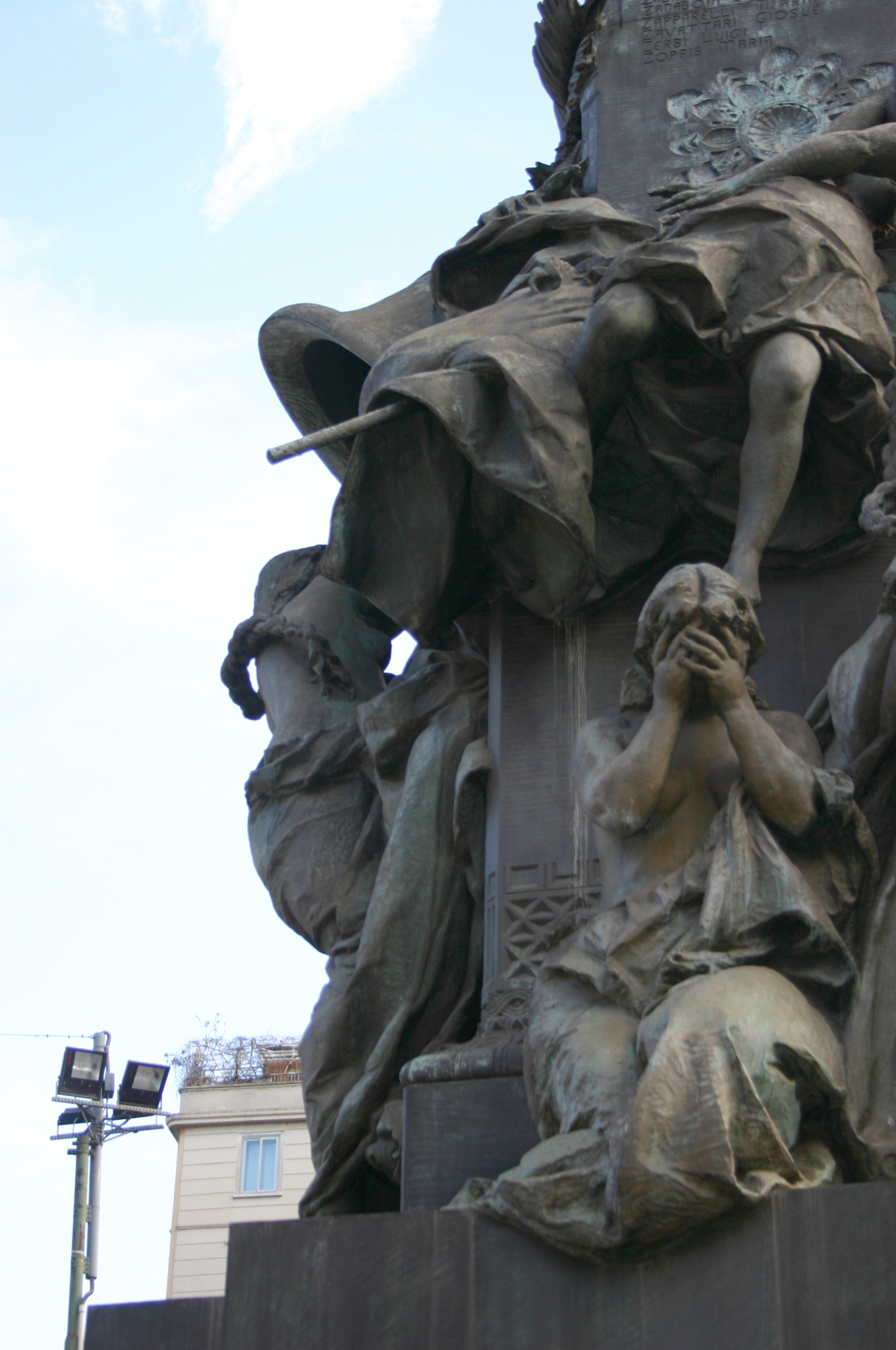
Day 2: Sorrow cries for the martyrs

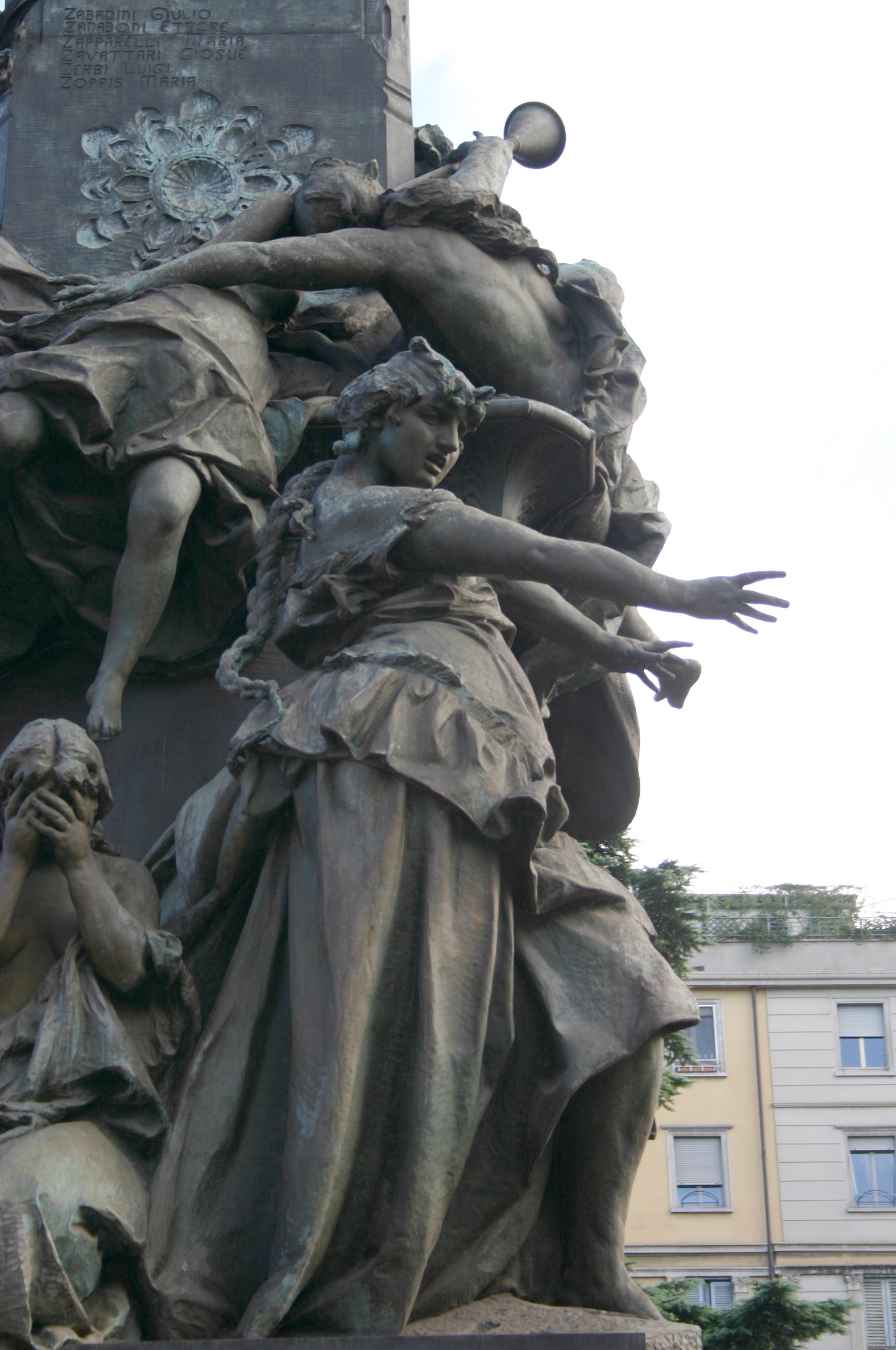
Day 3: Call to the barricades

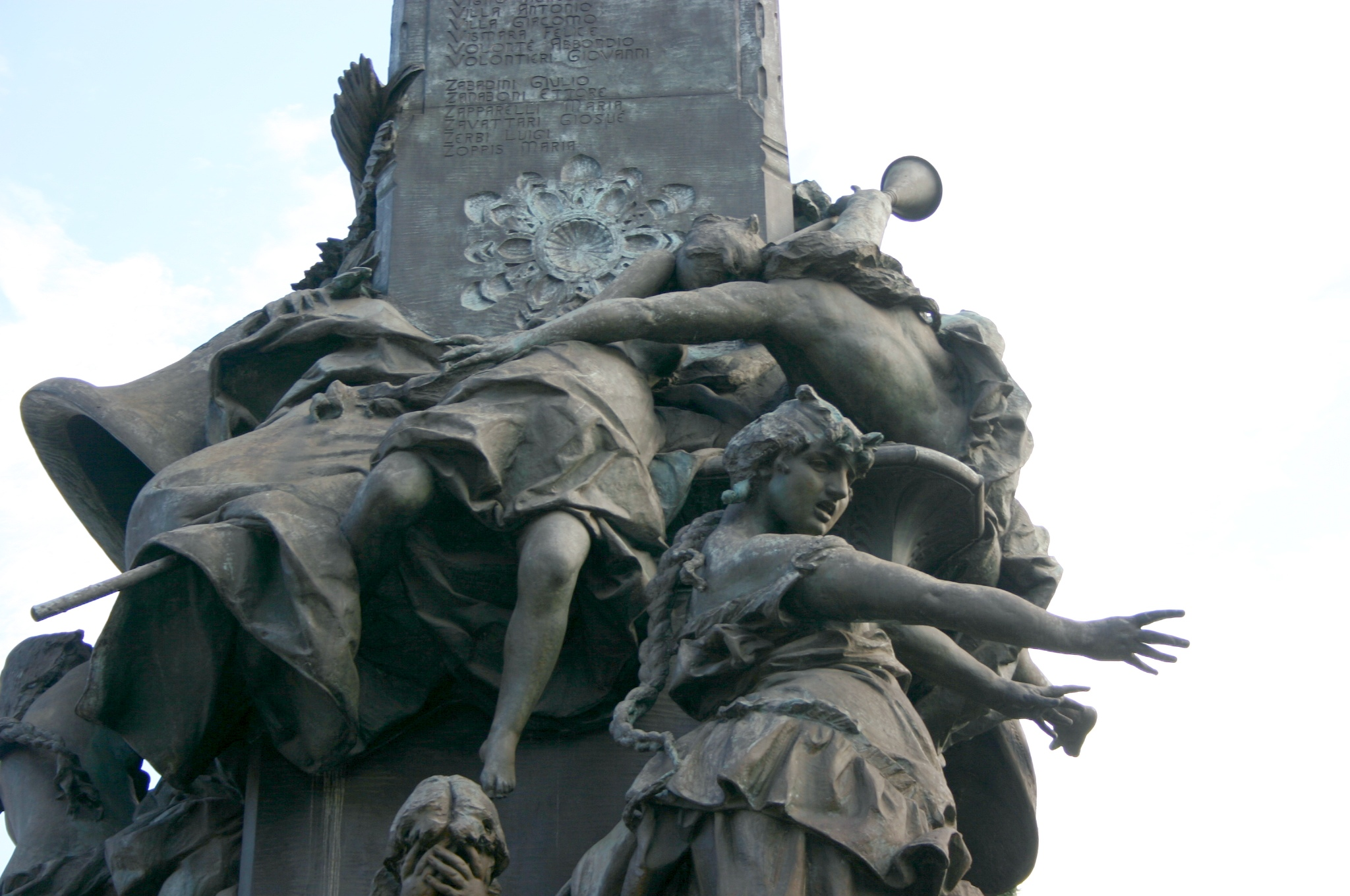
Day 4 and 5: Fame (on the right above) lifts Victory upward (upper left with legs dangling and blowing a trumpet)

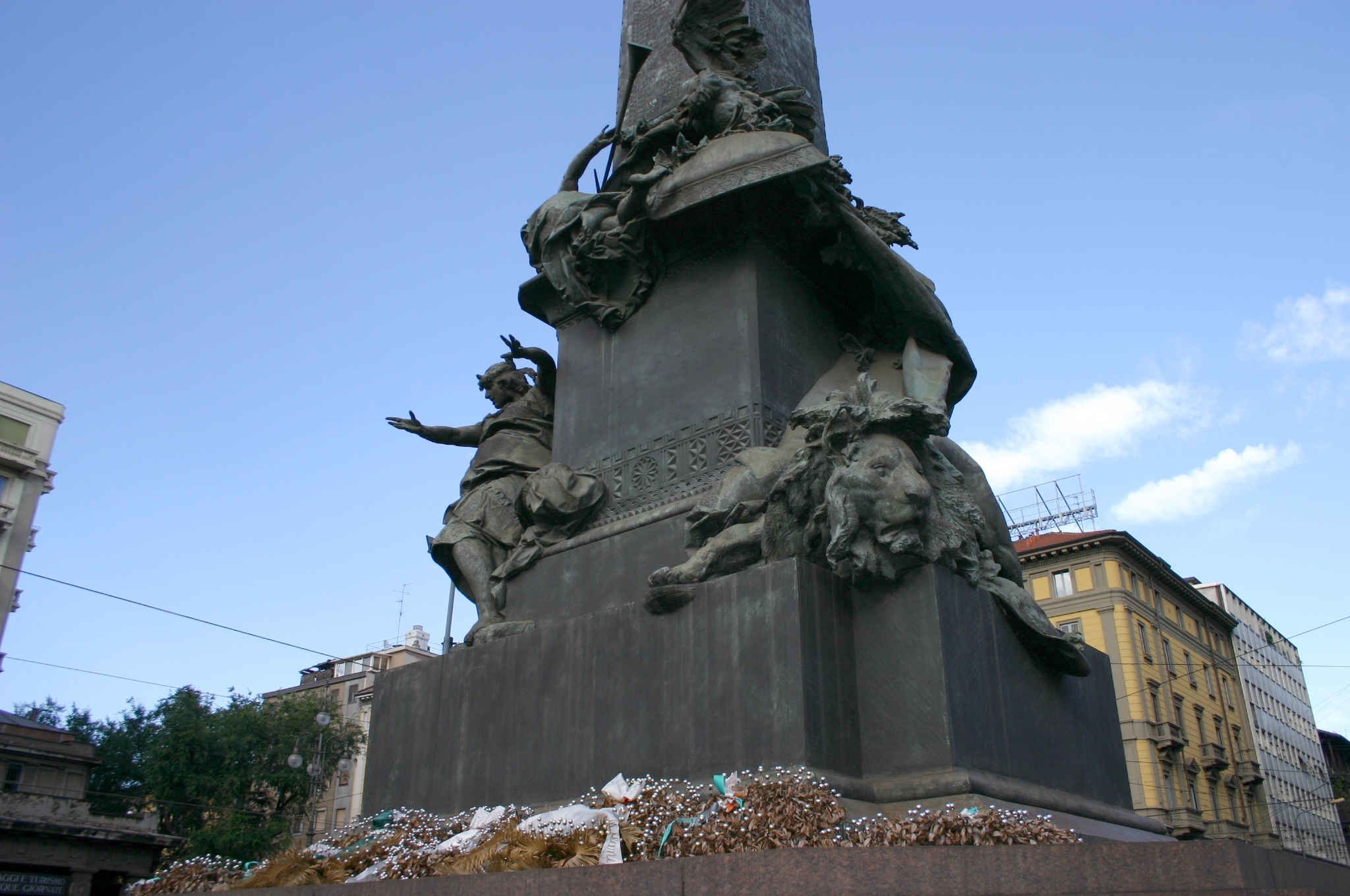
Lion among the debris of the barricades, representing the defense

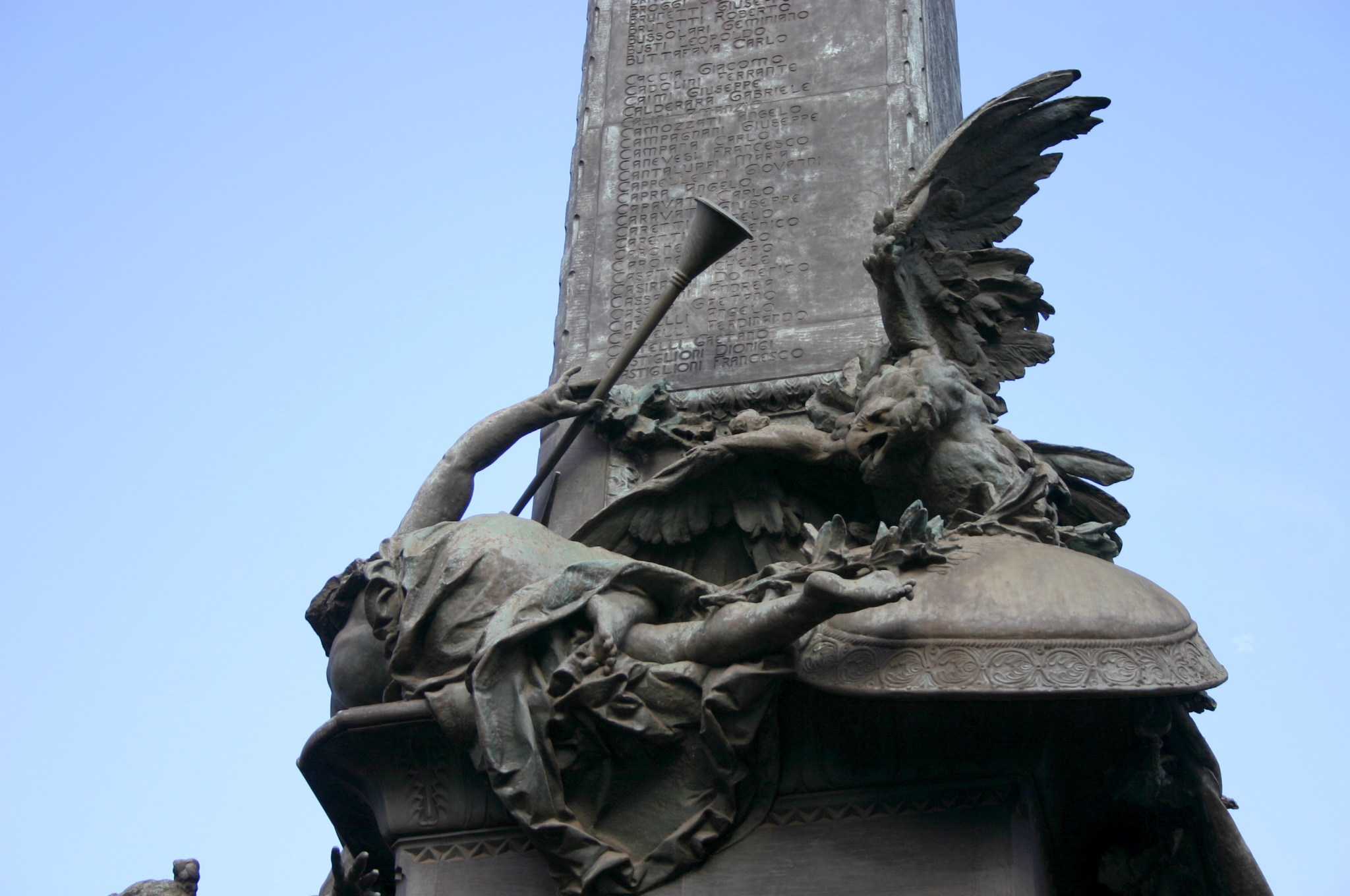
Eagle of victory
