= Milan Uprising =

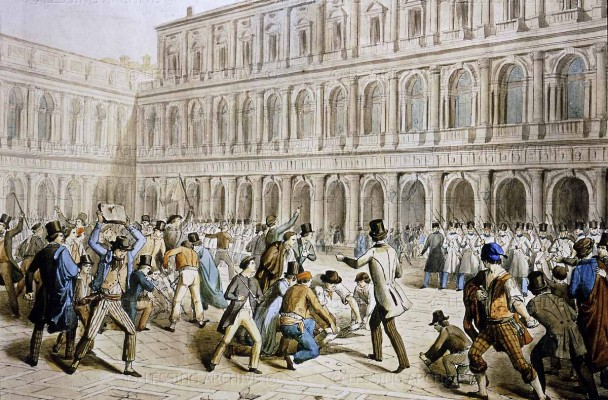
1853 uprising in Milan

The Milan Uprising was an episode of the Italian Risorgimento that took place on 6 February 1853 in Milan. It was the first time socialist ideals were associated with Italian patriotism and nationalism. The event had a broad impact on mainstream liberal public opinion in western Europe, moving support away from the Mazzinian movement and from socialist movements for Italian unification, and reinforcing the leadership of Victor Emmanuel II of Sardinia and Count Cavour.

== Background ==
After their victory in the First Italian War of Independence the Austrians governed the Kingdom of Lombardy–Venetia under emergency powers and military occupation. Members of the bourgeoisie and aristocracy who had opposed Austrian rule were mostly exiled to the neighbouring Kingdom of Sardinia. What remained in the Italian cities under Austrian rule were groups of republican conspirators, inspired, but not led, by Giuseppe Mazzini. In particular, autonomous cells had developed among the working class of Milan. From 1851 the Austrian authorities tightened their grip on these elements, arresting over one hundred militants and executing the Belfiore martyrs. The hostility towards Austria that these measures provoked led Mazzini to believe that the conditions were right in Milan for a new uprising.

== Developing plans ==
The insurrectionary committee established in Milan consisted of Giuseppe Piolti de Bianchi, civilian leader, Eugenio Brizzi, military leader, Fronti, logistics and Vigorelli, treasurer. it:Carlo De Cristoforis and it:Giovanni Battista Carta were both invited to join but neither believed an uprising would succeed and Carta was arrested and imprisoned several months before it took place.

The revolutionaries’ original plan was to take advantage of the grand ball held at Palazzo Marino on January 31 and attended by all the senior officers of the Austrian army. If a way could be found to poison them all, the Austrian garrison in Milan, leaderless, could then be easily overwhelmed. This initial plan was soon abandoned as impractical. Another proposal was to assassinate three leading Milanese aristocrats who were collaborating with the Austrians, so as to provoke a harsh government reaction, which would in turn ignite popular indignation. But this plan too was abandoned.

The leaders of the working class cells assured Brassi that they could mobilise 5,000 men, which turned out to be hopelessly optimistic, and in any case would likely not have been sufficient to overwhelm the well-armed and trained garrison. Mazzini also worked to weaken the resolved of the garrison, many of whom were Hungarians sympathetic to Lajos Kossuth. His main agent in this work was Mattia Gergics, a follower of Kossuth and deserter from the Austrian army living in hiding in Milan.

In the meantime, a consignment of rifles, promised from Genoa and Switzerland, never arrived and the Mazzinians and the republicans in exile outside Italy made it clear that they would not support the insurrection. The conspirators nevertheless decided to go ahead, trusting that the Milanese proletariat would join them.

Mazzini travelled from London in secret to support the insurrection. He managed to persuade the leaders not to proclaim a republic when they rose, in the hope of support from Victor Emmanuel II. The insurrectionary committee in turn persuaded Mazzini stay in Locarno in Switzerland until he could be sure the uprising had succeeded. Meanwhile, Austrian government spies were well aware that an insurrection was planned, as was the Kingdom of Sardinia, which both passed information to the Austrians and arrested a number of the conspirators. The 6 February was chosen as the date for the uprising because it was the last Sunday of Carnival and the conspirators expected the Austrian soldiers to be off duty in the city's taverns.

== Uprising ==
At the appointed time on Sunday 6 February 1853, at 4:45 p.m. only about four hundred craftsmen and workers mustered, armed with knives and daggers. Despite posting a forged message from Kossuth around the city, the conspirators did not persuade the Hungarian troops to mutiny or support the insurrection. In addition the promised help of a city engineer and his road maintenance workers also failed to materialise. They were supposed to help the rebels build barricades and cut the gas pipes to leave the city in darkness.

Barricades went up at the Piazza Cordusio, Porta Tosa, Piazza del Verzaro, Via della Signora, Via dell'Ospedale, Porta Ticinese, Porta Vicentina and the Via Torino. The most sustained action was at Porta Tosa, led by Giuseppe Varisco, Ferri, Biffi, Colla, the comb makers Saporiti and Carlo Galli, the greengrocer Crespi, and the shoemaker Galimberti.

The Gran Guardia at the Royal Palace was stormed: a number of men fought under the command of Ferri, including Camilo and Luigi Piazza brothers, Giuseppe Moiraghi, Modesto Diotti, Antonio Cavallotti, Alessandro Silva, Pietro Varisco, Luigi Brigatti, Giuseppe Forlivesi and Antonio Marozzi. The rebels managed to seize some rifles but could not hold their positions. Driven back, they continued to fight in via Rastrelli, Larga del Pesce (today via Paolo da Cannobbio), piazza Borromeo, San Bernardino alle Monache, Palazzo Litta and Contrada della Lupa. The original plan had been to storm the castle armoury and seize 12,000 guns for distribution but that was not even attempted, since of the 500 rebels committed to the assault only thirty actually turned up while the armoury was protected by 200 soldiers.

The most violent clashes took place in Corso di Porta Romana (where one soldier was killed); in it:Carrobbio (where the dead included the hatter Opizzi and the stonecutter Rivolta while one insurgent lost his arm); in Porta Ticinese; near the Palazzo Litta (where the brandy maker Antonio Cavallotti led the action, but was arrested); from via San Vincenzino to San Giovanni Sul Muro (where Francesco Segalini, supported by two of his sons, was seriously wounded and died on 2 March of blood loss); in the Piazza Duomo and in Mercanti; Piazza Fontana, in the district of the Borromei; and in Via Orefici.

With so many leaders failing to show up, and a lack of orders, it was very difficult to coordinate the different actions and mobilise others to join the fight. The only people outside the conspiracy who appear to have joined in the fighting were a number of common criminals and other non-political elements who took the opportunity to attack random soldiers and bourgeois passers-by in the street.

The Austrians quickly mustered their defences and brought in reinforcements from outside the city, which was back under their control by seven o’clock in the evening.

== Aftermath ==
The Austrian forces suffered 10 dead and around 50 wounded. Somewhere between forty and sixty civilians were also killed.

Among the insurgents, 895 were arrested, 16 of whom were hanged or shot:

- On 8 February those executed were Antonio Cavallotti, 31 years old, piano maker, single; Cesare Faccioli, 42 years old, coffee boy, single; Pietro Canevari, 23 years old, porter, single; Luigi Piazza, 29 years old, carpenter, single; Camillo Piazza, his brother, 26 years old, type printer, single; Alessandro Silva, 32 years old, hatter, married; Bonaventura Broggini, 57 years old, butcher's boy, single; Luigi Brigatti, 26 years old, liquor dealer.
- On 10 February those executed were Alessandro Scannini, 56 years old, private high school teacher; Benedetto Biotti, 40 years old, carpenter's boy; and Giuseppe Monti, 36 years old, carpenter's boy.
- On 14 February those executed were Gaetano or Girolamo Saporiti, 26 years old, comb makers and Siro Taddei, 27 years old, milkman.
- The last executions took place in 17 February: Angelo Galimberti, shoemaker: Angelo Bissi, porter; and Pietro Colla, blacksmith.

Of the others arrested and tried, 20 were initially sentenced to death by hanging, but this was later commuted to 20 years in prison; 44 were sentenced to 20 years "in irons" or to "forced labor with heavy irons" or 10 years "with light irons" (many of these sentences were later commuted to 2 years in prison). A further 175 were acquitted. The main organisers of the uprising - Brizi, Piolti de’ Bianchi, Assi and Giussani, managed to escape into exile.

== Impact ==
Following this bloody failure, Mazzini was subjected to an avalanche of criticism not only from the moderate camp but also from his own followers. He responded by reaffirming his faith in insurrectional and conspiratorial methods. He also announced the birth of the Action Party, a movement to unite all those men still willing to fight to achieve the objectives of Italian unity and independence.

Austria adopted harsh measures following the uprising. On 18 February Marshal Radetsky announced that the property of all residents of Lombardy-Venetia who had fled Austrian rule was to be seized, regardless of the fact that many of them had taken up Sardinian citizenship. This was intended to dampen down support in wealthier and more educated circles in Sardinia for the Mazzinian cause. He also imposed financial sanctions on the city of Milan to pay for pensions for victims of the uprising, and for the care of the wounded.

Sardinia responded to these measures fairly calmly, expelling about 150 radicals itself and setting up a fund for the relief of Lombard exiles whom it did not consider to be persona non grata. It expended considerable diplomatic effort in trying to raise international support against Austria, which was not successful but helped pave the way for Sardinia's participation in the Crimean War. When the press in Turin became outspoken in its criticism of Austria, Foreign Minister Giuseppe Dabormida tried to limit the damage by offering to circulate official statements condemning the views expressed.

International public opinion did not look kindly on the uprising. The Economist, for example, while affirming its solidarity with oppressed peoples, described the events in Milan as “insignificant”, “doomed to failure” and “discrediting the cause.”

== Marx's Criticism ==
Karl Marx, in an article in the New York Daily Tribune on 7 March 1853, entitled "The Milan Riot", mounted a polemical attack on Mazzini whom he disparagingly called "Theopompus", the "messenger of God", attributing to him the failure of the spontaneous revolutions due to lack of organisation, resulting in the sacrifice of the Milanese insurgents despite their useless heroism. He wrote: "The Milan insurrection is significant as a symptom of the approaching revolutionary crisis on the whole European continent. As the heroic act of some few proletarians the sons of Mammon were dancing, and singing, and feasting amid the blood and tears of their debased and crucified nation proletarians who, armed only with knives, marched to attack the citadel of a garrison and surrounding army of forty thousand of the finest troops in Europe, it is admirable. But as the finale of Mazzini's eternal conspiracy, of his bombastic proclamations and his arrogant capucinades against the French people, it is a very poor result. Let us hope that henceforth there will be an end of révolutions improvisées, as the French call them. Has one ever heard of great improvisators being also great poets? They are the same in politics as in poetry. Revolutions are never made to order. After the terrible experience of '48 and '49, it needs something more than paper summonses from distant leaders to evoke national revolutions.”

== Commemoration ==
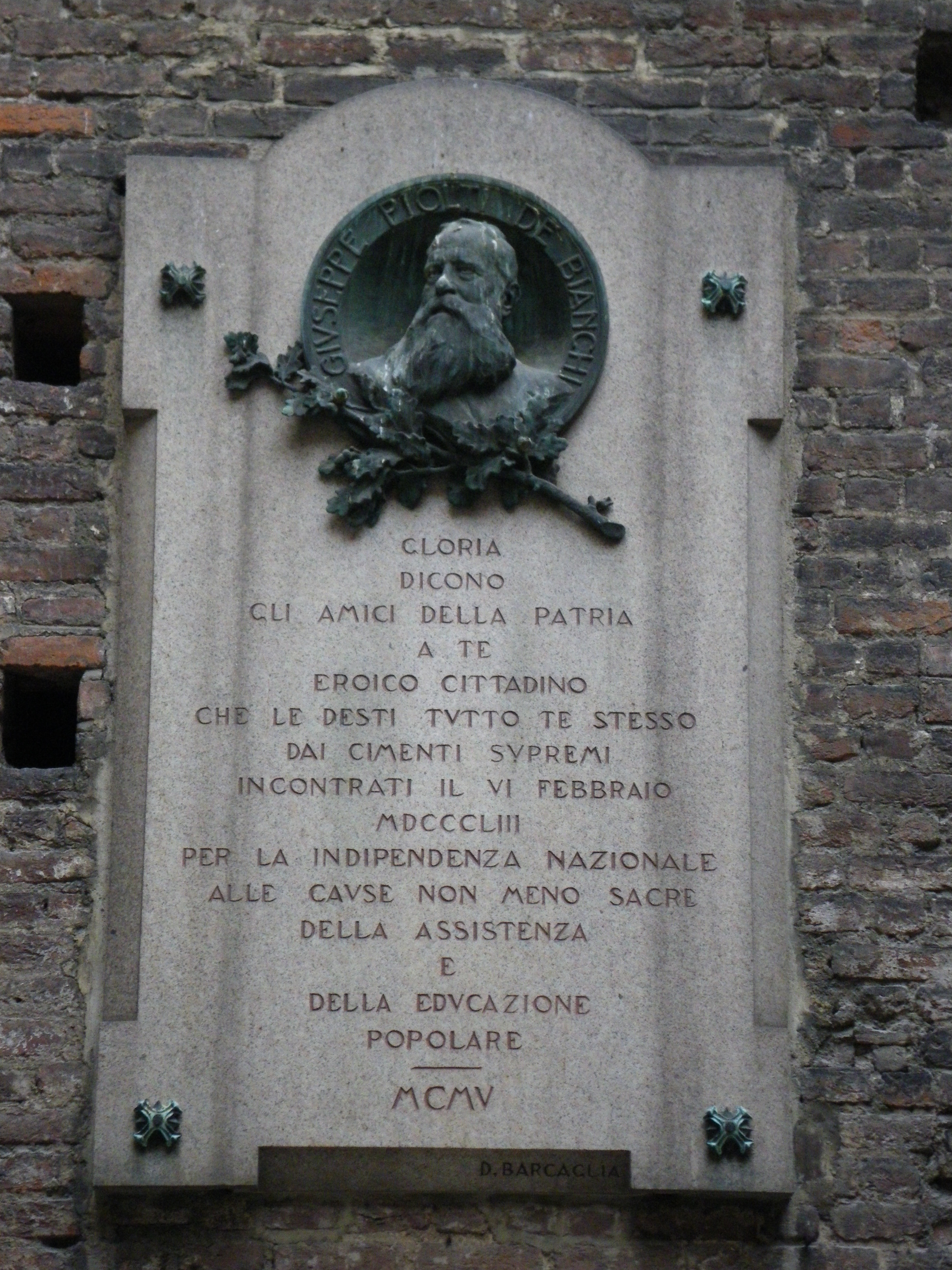
Commemorative plaque for Piolti de’ Bianchi

In 1900, the city of Milan dedicated the Piazza Sei Febbraio to the memory of the uprising and in 1903, on the fiftieth anniversary of the uprising, a commemorative plaque for those executed was placed on the wall of the castle. A number of streets in the Baggio district were also named after executed insurgents in 1920.

According to Alberto Celletti, the reason for commemorating the Milan Uprising today is that it “involves the unquenchable desire for revolution of the Italians and in particular of the people of Milan, who in those years proved to be among the "warmest" in spirit. This is not an aspect to be underestimated: the insistence of part of the citizens attracted the attention of both Giuseppe Mazzini and the House of Savoy, who saw in Milan a nerve center from which to launch any future attempts. The moral is simple: even failures serve to bear witness to a history of commitment useful to posterity. And this revolt teaches us that that with particular importance.”

In memory of those who fell during the revolt, the municipality of Milan placed a wreath at the plaque commemorating the uprising in 2022.

== See also ==
- Five Days of Milan
