= Luisa Battistati =

Italian insurrection hero

Luisa Battistati was an Italian 19th-century woman who is recorded in American writer Sarah Josepha Hale’s Sketches of all distinguished women (1853) as a heroine of the insurrection against Austrian rule that had taken place in Lombardy known as the Five Days of Milan. The revolt took place during the period 18–22 March 1848 and was successful in expelling the Austrian garrison, commanded by Josef Radetzky, from the city. Radetzky would re-enter Milan on 6 August of that year, however, and Austria remained in control of the city until 1859.

Hale wrote:

A native of Stradella, Sardinia, and a mantua-maker at Milan, [Luisa Battistati] displayed remarkable courage during the five days of the Revolution at Milan, in 1848. On Sunday, March 10th, she disarmed a cavalry soldier, though he carried a carbine. She placed herself at the head of the Poppietti bridge, and steadily continued there, fighting against the enemy during the 20th, 21st, and 22d days [of March], heading a valiant band of young men, and killing a Croate [sic] at every shot. She defended the large establishment at Vettabia, which contained 580 persons, being the edifice in which the widows and their children, and other females took refuge when Barbaressa [sic] stormed Milan. This young woman was, in 1850, married, and doing duty in the civic guard.

Her entry in Henry Gardiner Adams’s A Cyclopaedia of Female Biography (1857) is identical down to the spelling, save for the statement that ‘[t]o this woman must be given a place in history, beside the heroine of Saragossa, and other examples of female intrepidity’, while the description of Battistati in Ellen Creathorne Clayton’s Female Warriors : Memorials of Female Valour and Heroism, from the Mythological Ages to the Present Era (1879) is a paraphrase of Hale’s text. She also appears in Jessica Amanda Salmonson’s The Encyclopedia of Amazons (1991).
