= Five Days of Milan =

1848 conflict during the First Italian War of Independence

- Part of the First Italian War of Independence
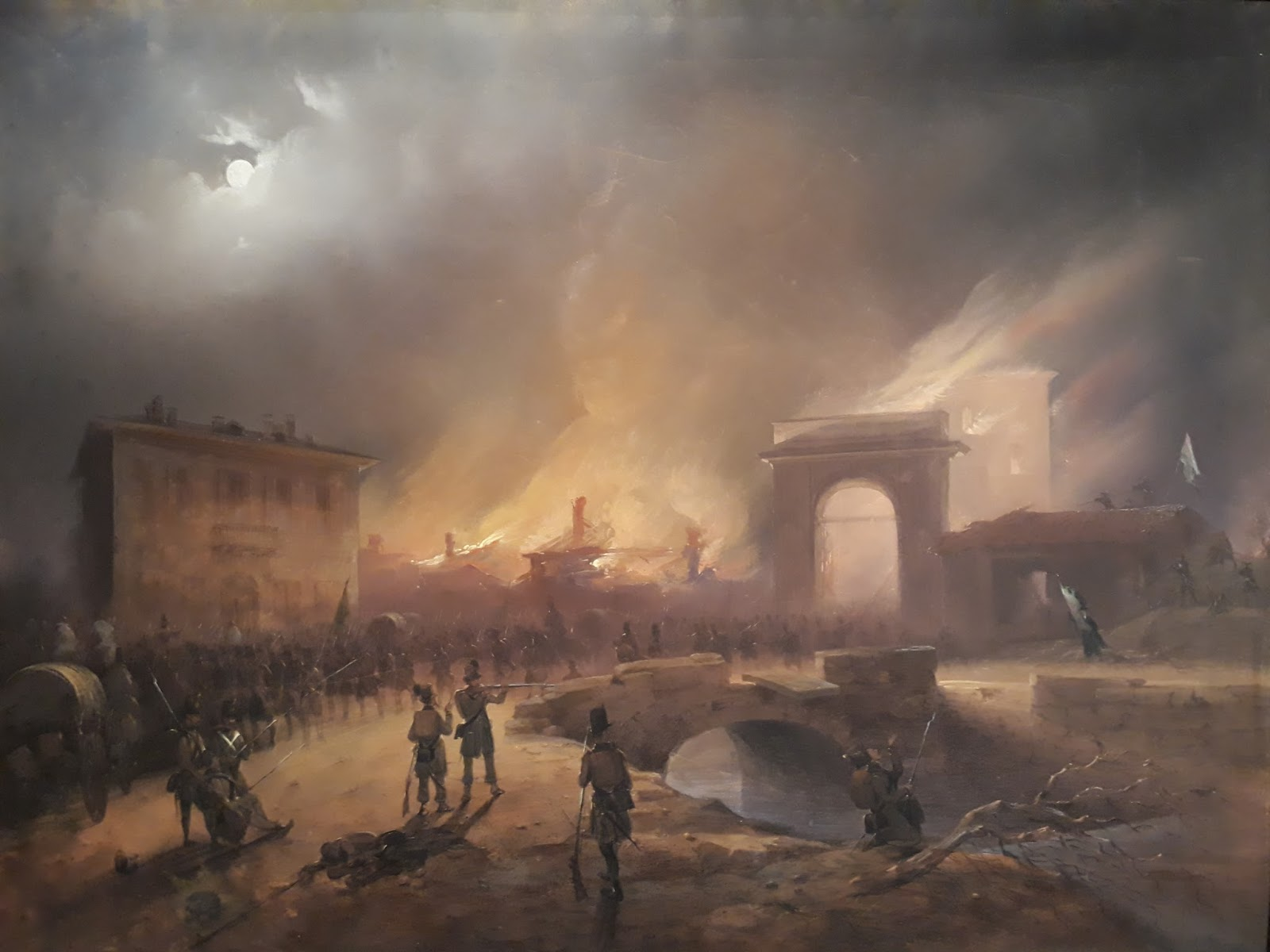
- The Five Days of Milan by Carlo Bossoli
Date	18–22 March 1848
Location	Milan, Lombardy–Venetia (present-day Italy) 45°28′01″N 09°11′24″E
Result	Milanese revolt victorious: Radetzky retreats from Milan

Belligerents
Milanese insurgents	Austria

Commanders and leaders
Carlo Cattaneo; Gabrio Casati; Luciano Manara	Joseph Radetzky; Ludwig von Wohlgemuth

Strength
1,700 barricades armed with 600–650 firearms along with stones, bottles, clubs, pikes and swords	12,000 garrison

Casualties and losses
409–424 killed including 43 women and children 600+ wounded	181 killed including 5 officers 235 wounded including 4 officers 150–180 captured

The Five Days of Milan (Italian: Cinque giornate di Milano [ˈtʃiŋkwe dʒorˈnaːte di miˈlaːno]) was an insurrection and a major event in the Revolutionary Year of 1848 that started the First Italian War of Independence. On 18 March, a rebellion arose in the city of Milan which in five days of street fighting drove Marshal Radetzky and his Austrian soldiers from the city.

== Background ==
In 1848, the Milanese launched an anti-Austrian campaign as early as 1 January. On New Year's Day the Milanese started to boycott gambling and tobacco products, which were government monopolies that brought in over 5 million lire a year. The boycott culminated in a bloody street battle on 3 January, when Austrian soldiers, in batches of three, were being insulted and pelted with stones by an angry crowd. The soldiers then gathered together in groups of a dozen and charged the crowd with swords and bayonets, killing five and wounding another 59. Radetzky confined his troops to barracks for five days. The protests were over, but two months later, when news reached Milan of the uprising in Vienna and the fall of Metternich, the Milanese took to the streets again, on 18 March.

== Events ==
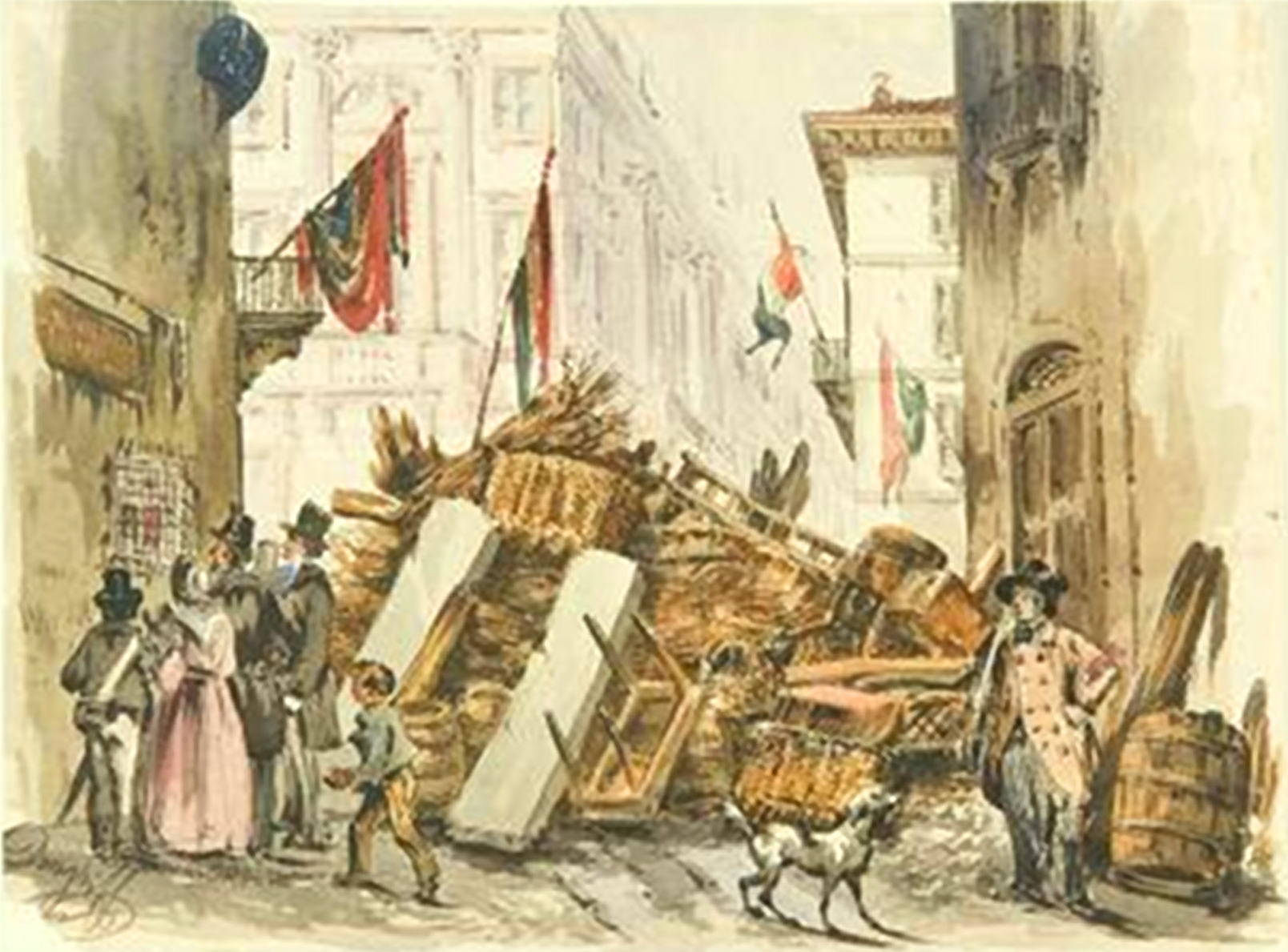
A milanese barricade during the 'five days'

Almost simultaneously with other popular uprisings across the Kingdom of Lombardy–Venetia, on 18 March 1848, the city of Milan also rose up. This was the first evidence of how effective popular initiative, guided by those in the Risorgimento, was able to influence Charles Albert of Sardinia.

The Austrian garrison at Milan was well equipped and commanded by an experienced general, Joseph Radetzky von Radetz, who despite being over 80 years old, was energetic and rigid. Radetzky had no intention of yielding to the uprising.

However, the whole city fought throughout the streets, raising barricades, firing from windows and roofs, and urging the rural population to join them. The populace was backed by the archbishop and at least 100 priests joined in the fighting against the Austrians. A bust of Pope Pius IX was hoisted onto the barricades. A provisional government of Milan was formed and presided over by the podestà, Gabrio Casati and a council of war under Carlo Cattaneo. The Martinitt (orphanage children) worked as message runners to all parts of the town.

Radetzky saw the difficulty of resisting under siege in the city centre, but while afraid of being attacked by the Piedmontese army and peasants from the countryside, he preferred to withdraw after losing control of the Porta Tosa (now Porta Vittoria) to the rebels. On the evening of 22 March, the Austrians withdrew towards the "Quadrilatero" (the fortified zone bounded by the four cities of Verona, Legnago, Mantua and Peschiera del Garda), 120 km eastwards, taking with them several hostages arrested at the start of the uprising. Meanwhile, the rest of Lombard and Venetic territory was free.

In memory of these days, the official newspaper of the temporary government was called simply Il 22 marzo (22 March), which began publication on 26 March at the Palazzo Marino under the direction of Carlo Tenca.

== Legacy ==
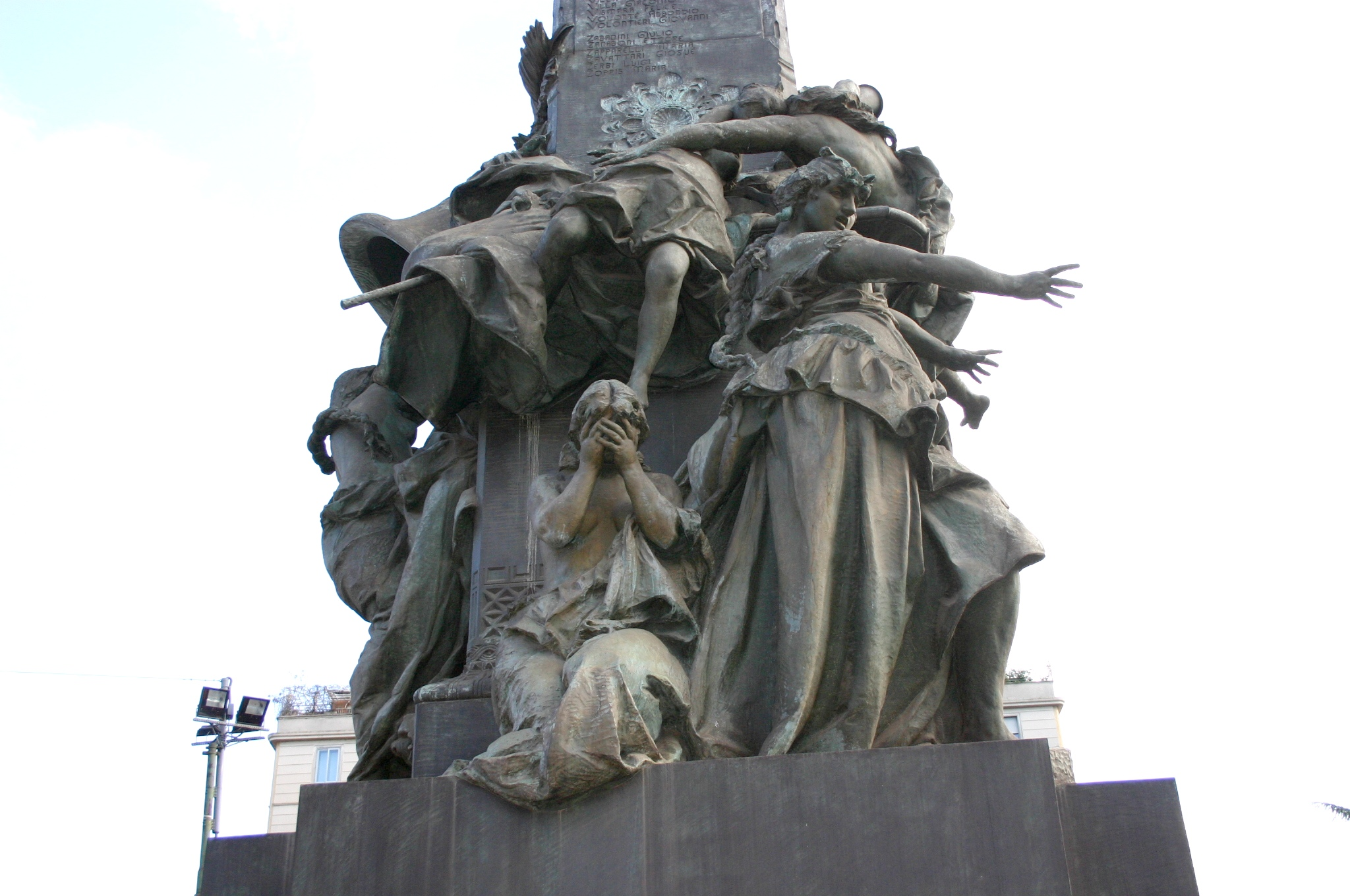
Statuary at the base of the 1895 monument to the Five Days of Milan by Giuseppe Grandi.

A Monument to the Five Days of Milan by the sculptor Giuseppe Grandi was inaugurated in 1895 at what is now Porta Vittoria.

Almost a century later, in 1943, the uprising of Naples against WWII Nazi occupation was named The Four Days of Naples, in conscious emulation of the earlier Milan event.

== See also ==
- List of revolutions and rebellions
  - List of rebellions in the Habsburg monarchy
- Luisa Battistati
- Carlo Cattaneo
- Enrico Dandolo
- Luciano Manara
- Emilio Morosini
- Guerra regia e guerra di popolo
- Revolutions of 1848 in the Italian states
- Milan Uprising
