= Royal war and popular war =

The distinction between a royal war and a popular (or people's) war (Guerra regia e guerra di popolo) is a recurring concept in the historiography of the Italian Risorgimento, referring to the two possible forms in which the whole of Italy could be conquered and formed into a single independent state.

== First Italian Independence War ==
In the First Independence War for Italy, which ended unfavourably for the Risorgimento cause, there was a balance between two initiatives: people's war and royal war. The notable moments in the people's war were:

- the Five Days of Milan, chronologically the first notable action that led to the Austrians' exit from Milan, which was thus brought about solely by a spontaneous revolt by the city's inhabitants.
- the Repubblica di San Marco, which governed Venice from 17 March 1848 to 22 August 1849 and only fell after a hard-fought siege.
- the Ten Days of Brescia, in which Brescia's inhabitants responded to Austrian repression by resisting their troops from 23 March (the day of Piedmont's defeat at Novara) to 1 April 1849.
- the Roman Republic from 24 November 1848 (the flight of pope Pius IX) to 3 July 1849.

The royal war was the campaign by the Kingdom of Piedmont-Sardinia, including the battles of Goito, Peschiera del Garda, Custoza and Novara.

== Second Italian Independence War ==
The Second Independence War was a typical example of royal war led by Victor Emmanuel II, allied to Napoleon III in conducting a war against Austria. The people's war was only a minor support Hunters of the Alps, a corps of volunteers commanded by Giuseppe Garibaldi and considered as a special unit within the royal army.

== Expedition of the Thousand ==
The Expedition of the Thousand was entirely a people's war, with Garibaldi being its central figure.

== Third Italian Independence War ==
In the Third Independence War, with the Italian defeats at Custoza and Lissa, was essentially a royal war, though the corps of volunteers under Garibaldi did win a victory at Bezzecca.

== Analogy with the Resistance ==
The same contrast between royal war and people's war can be applied to the history of the Second World War, when a disastrous war under the royal and fascist régime was followed by the people's war of the Italian Resistance.

== Bibliography ==
- A. Monti, Guerra regia e guerra di popolo nel Risorgimento, in Questioni di Storia a cura di Rota (1951)
