= Porta Vittoria =

Coordinates: 45°27′44″N 9°12′26″E

- Quartiere of Milan
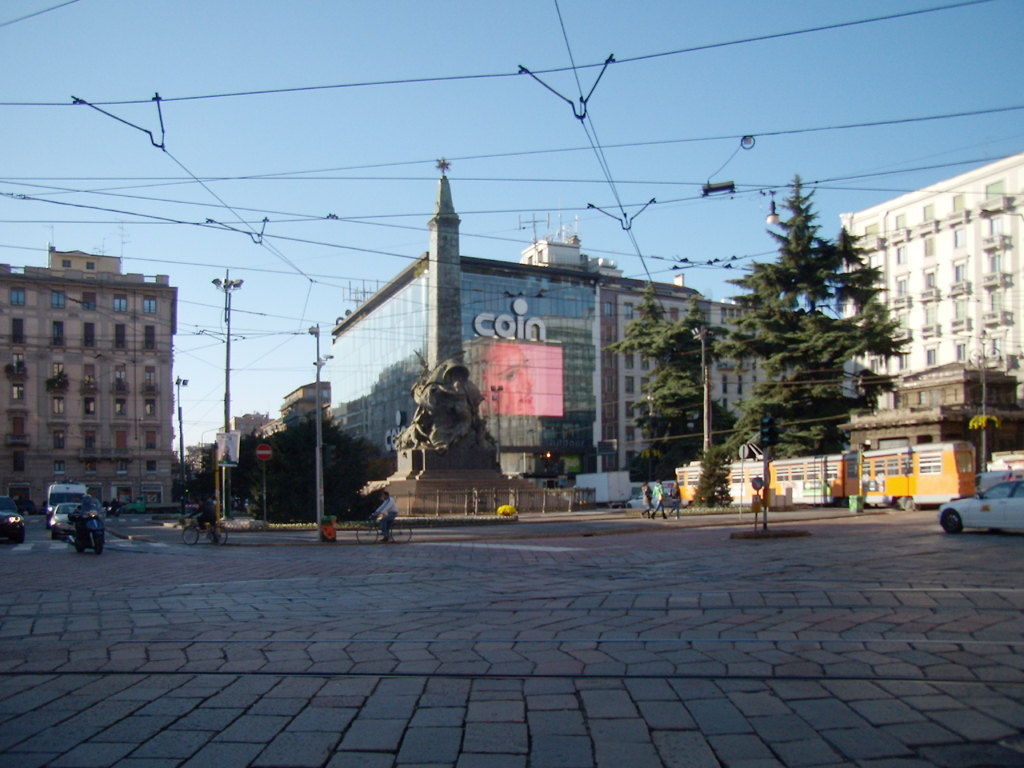
- Piazza Cinque Giornate with Monument to the Five Days of Milan at center
- Interactive map of Porta Vittoria
- Country: Italy
- Region: Lombardy
- Province: Milan
- Comune: Milan
- Zone: 4
- Time zone: UTC+1 (CET)
  - Summer (DST): UTC+2 (CEST)

Porta Vittoria (formerly Porta Tosa) was a city gate in the Spanish walls of Milan, Italy. While the walls and the gate have been demolished, the name "Porta Vittoria" has remained to refer to the district ("quartiere") where the gate used to be. This district is part of the Zone 4 administrative division of Milan.

== History ==
Porta Tosa was the eastern gate of the Spanish walls of Milan, dating back to the 16th century. During the Five Days of Milan, Porta Tosa was the first to be conquered by the Milanese rebels, on 22 March 1848 (an event known as "The Battle of Porta Tosa"). In 1861, when the Italian unification was completed, the gate was renamed "Porta Vittoria" (Victory Gate) after that victorious episode.

What remained of the Spanish walls and gates was demolished in the 19th century. In 1881, Giuseppe Grandi designed a monument with a bronze obelisk to be placed in the square where the gate used to be; it was inaugurated on 18 March 1895.

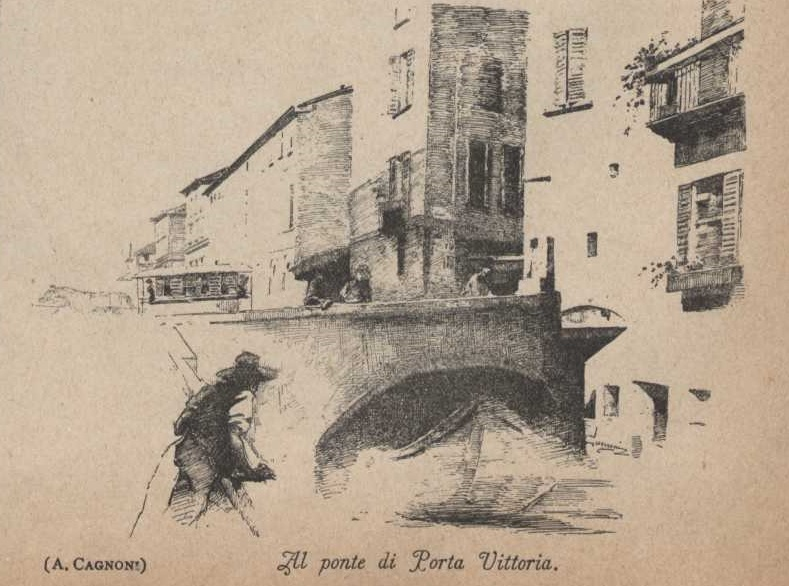
The Porta Vittoria bridge in the 19th century

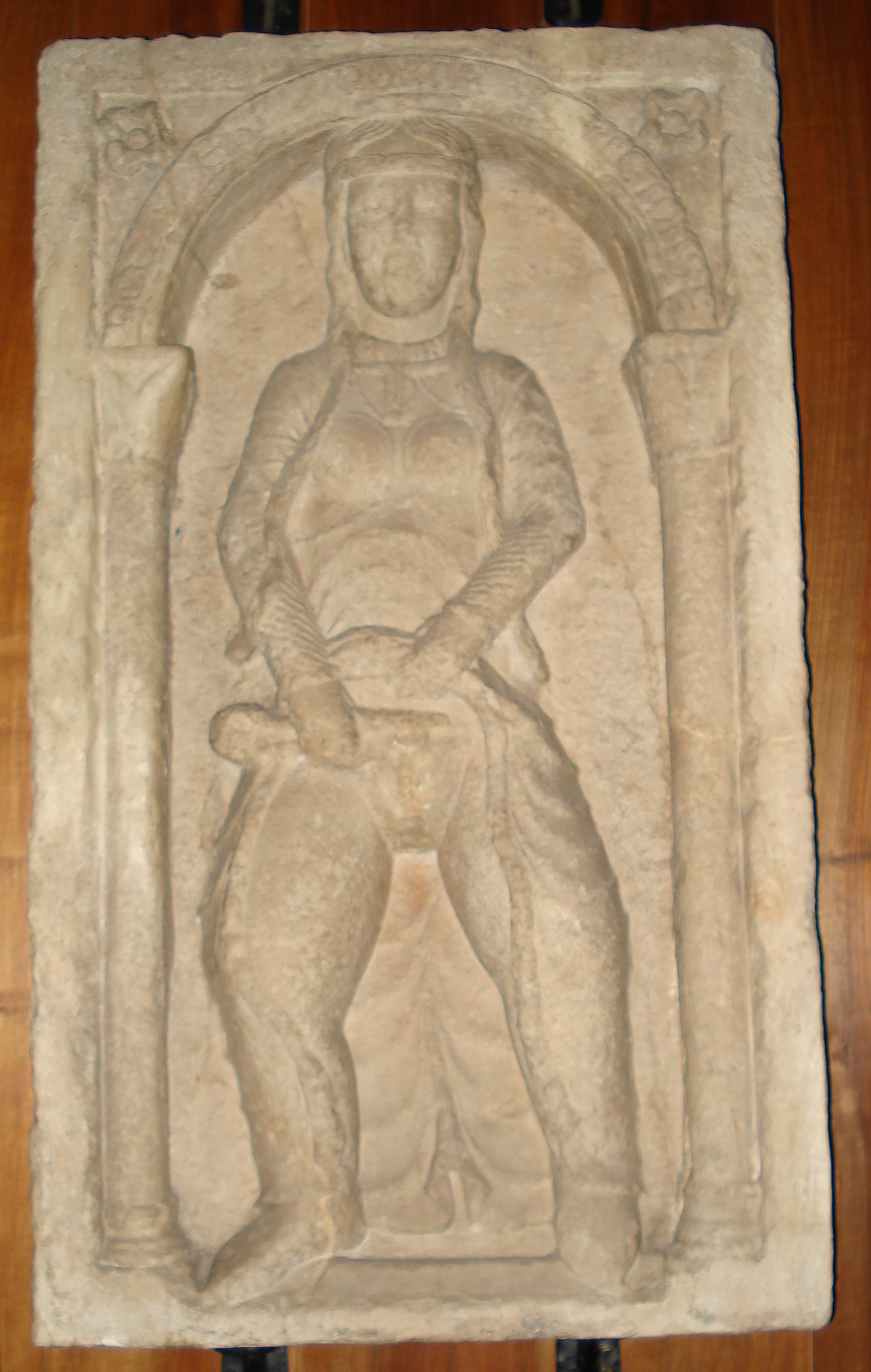
13th century bas-relief from Porta Tosa. It has been suggested that the woman showing off her genitalia might be a provocative representation of Frederick I Barbarossa's wife.

== The district ==
The centre of the Porta Vittoria district is the square where Grandi's obelisk is located; this square is now called Piazza Cinque Giornate ("Five Days Square"). Most streets, avenues, and square in the district are named after heroes and prominent events of the Milanese Risorgimento and the Five Days.

A large avenue crossing Piazza Cinque Giornate in east–west direction is called Corso di Porta Vittoria to the west and Corso 22 Marzo to the west. The Palazzo di Giustizia, the main courthouse, is centered on Corso di Porta Vittoria, and is noted for its "austere" Fascist architecture.

In the north–south direction, the Piazza is crossed by one of the main ring roads of Milan, the Circonvallazione Interna ("inner ringroad", as opposed to the Circonvallazione Esterna, the "outer ringroad" which embraces a much wider area). In the Porta Vittoria district, the Circonvallazione Interna is composed of streets Viale Montenero and Viale Regina Margherita.

The area is mostly a shopping district, with Piazza Cinque Giornate, as well as the two Corsos, being lined with large stores and shops. To the east, it borders on Città Studi ("city of the studies"), where major universities of Milan have their headquarters.
