= Carlo Cattaneo =

Italian patriot, philosopher and politician (1801–1869)

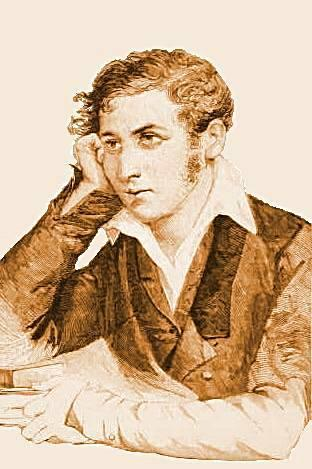
- Young Carlo Cattaneo in an 1887 woodcut by Edoardo Matania

President of Provisional Government of Milan
- In office 18 March 1848 – 5 August 1848
- Preceded by: Office created
- Succeeded by: Office abolished

Personal details
- Born: 15 June 1801 Milan, Cisalpine Republic
- Died: 6 February 1869 (aged 67) Lugano, Switzerland
- Resting place: Cimitero Monumentale di Milano, Italy
- Domestic partner: Anna Woodcock (1835–1869; his death)
- Education: University of Pavia
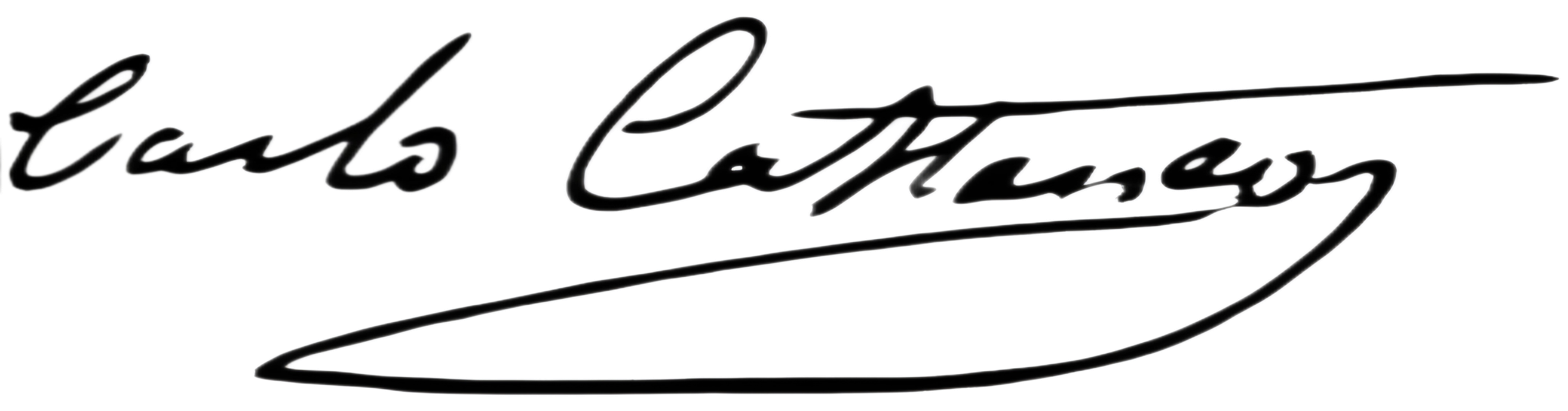
- Signature

Carlo Cattaneo (Italian: [ˈkarlo katˈtaːneo]; 15 June 1801 – 6 February 1869) was an Italian philosopher, writer, and activist, famous for his role in the Five Days of Milan in March 1848, when he led the city council during the rebellion.

== Early life and education ==
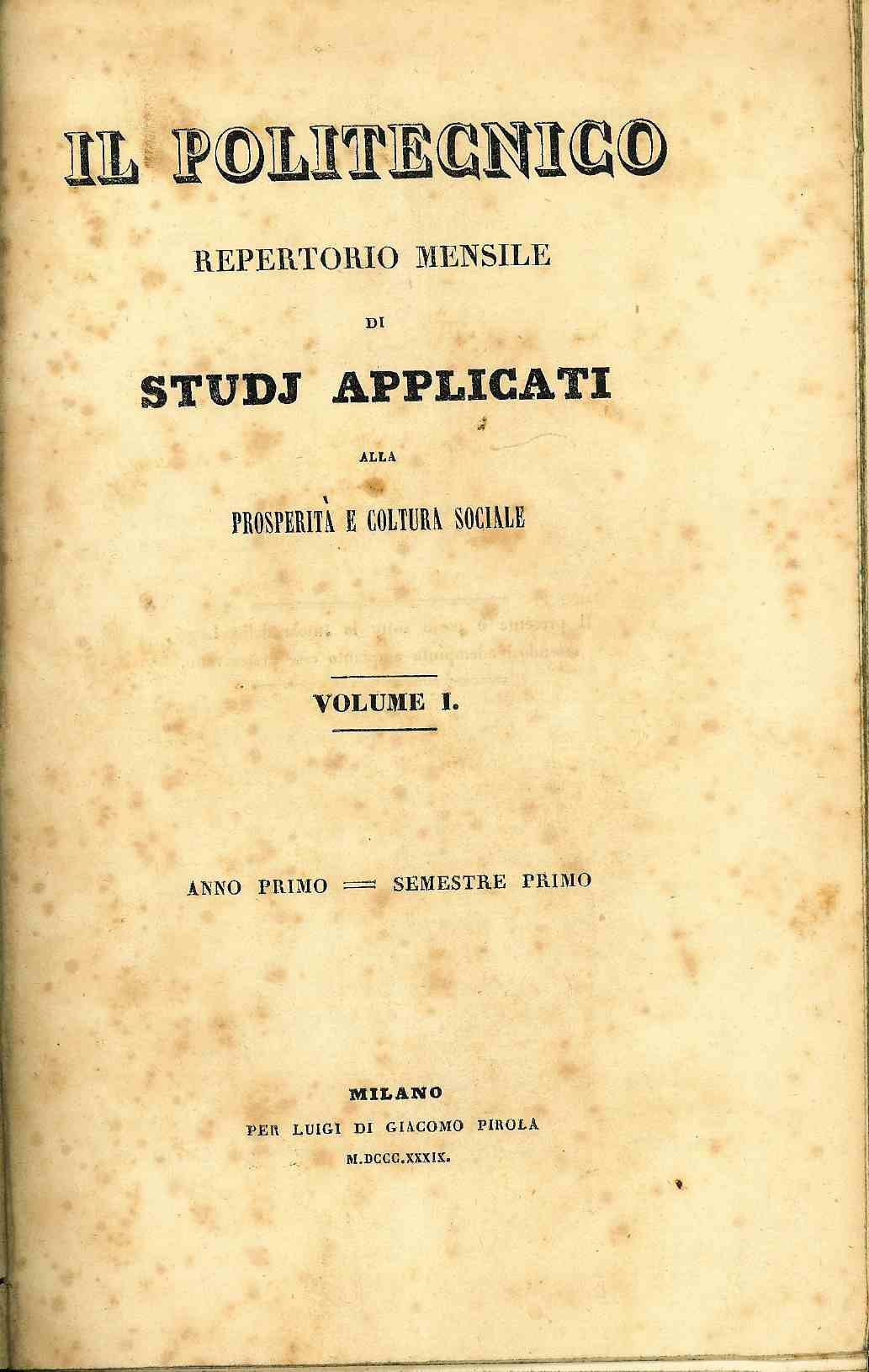
The first issue of "Il Politecnico"

Cattaneo was born in Milan on 15 June 1801. He was the son of Melchiorre Cattaneo, a goldsmith, and Maria Antonia Sangiorgi. After attending school in Milan he studied law at the University of Pavia, graduating in 1824.

A republican in his convictions, during his youth Cattaneo had taken part in the Carbonari movement in Lombardy. He devoted himself to the study of philosophy, with the hope of regenerating Italian people by withdrawing them from romanticism and rhetoric, and turning their attention to the positive sciences. In this period, Cattaneo met philosopher Giandomenico Romagnosi and he "was especially attracted by Romagnosi's emphasis on practical solutions and interdisciplinary work". Cattaneo expounded his ideas in a review initiated by him in Milan in 1839, called Il Politecnico. He resided at the Palazzo Gavazzi from 1840 until 1848. In 1835 married his longtime fiancé Anne Pyne Woodcock (Limerick 1793 - Lugano 1869), a noblewoman.

== 1848 revolution ==
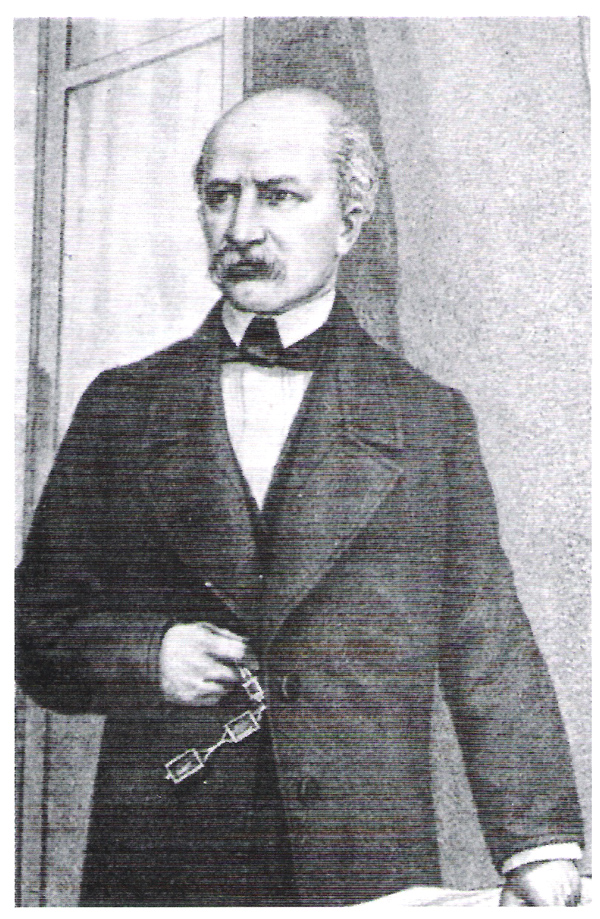
Cattaneo in his later years

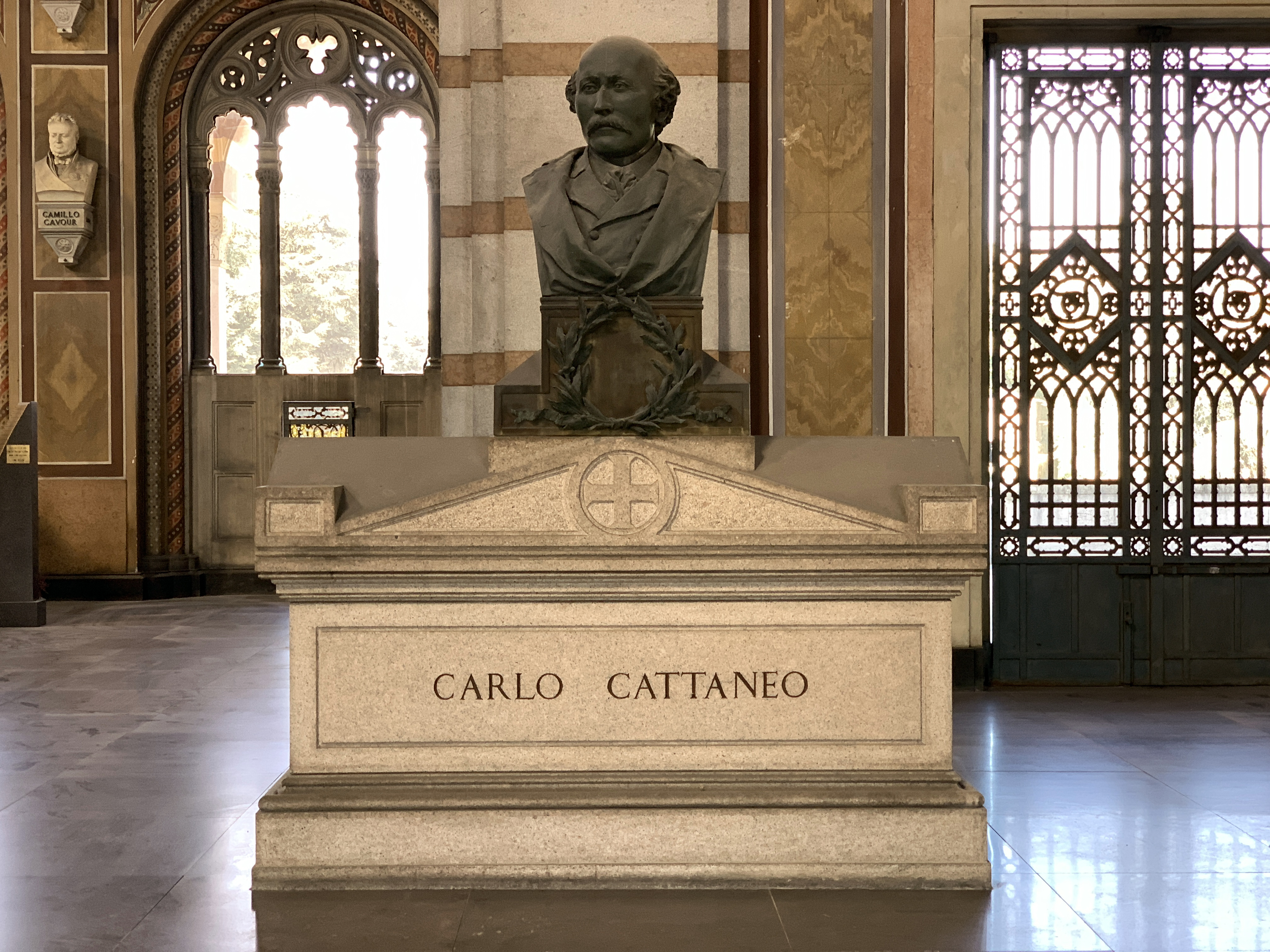
Cattaneo's grave at the Monumental Cemetery of Milan

Cattaneo was a moderate Italian patriot. He supported the revolutions of 1848 and moved to Lombardy where a revolutionary council took control of the city administration. Cattaneo became one of the leaders of the insurrection against the Austrian Empire, known as the Five Days of Milan (18-22 March 1848). Together with the young democrats Enrico Cernuschi, Giulio Terzaghi, and Giorgio Clerici he formed a council of war which, having its headquarters at Palazzo Taverna in via Bigli, directed the operations of the insurgents.

When on March 18 Field Marshal Radetzky, feeling that the position of the Austrian garrison was untenable, sounded the rebels as to their terms, some of the leaders were inclined to agree to an armistice which would give time for the Piedmontese troops to arrive (Piedmont had just declared war), but Cattaneo insisted on the complete evacuation of Lombardy. Again, on 21 March, Radetzky tried to obtain an armistice, and Durini and Borromeo were ready to grant it, for it would have enabled them to reorganize the defences and replenish the supplies of food and ammunition, which could only last another day. However, Cattaneo replied:

The enemy having furnished us with munitions thus far, will continue to do so. Twenty-four hours of victuals and twenty-four hours of hunger will be many more hours than we shall need. This evening, if the plans we have just arranged should succeed, the line of the bastions will be broken. At any rate, even though we should lack bread, it is better to die of hunger than on the gallows.

On the expulsion of the Austrians the question arose as to the future government of Milan and Italy. Cattaneo was an uncompromising republican and a federalist; so violent was his dislike of the Piedmontese monarchy that when he heard that King Charles Albert had been defeated by the Austrians, and that Radetzky was marching back to reoccupy Milan, he exclaimed:

Good news, the Piedmontese have been beaten. Now we shall be our own masters; we shall fight a people's war, we shall chase the Austrians out of Italy, and set up a Federal Republic.

== Exile and later career ==
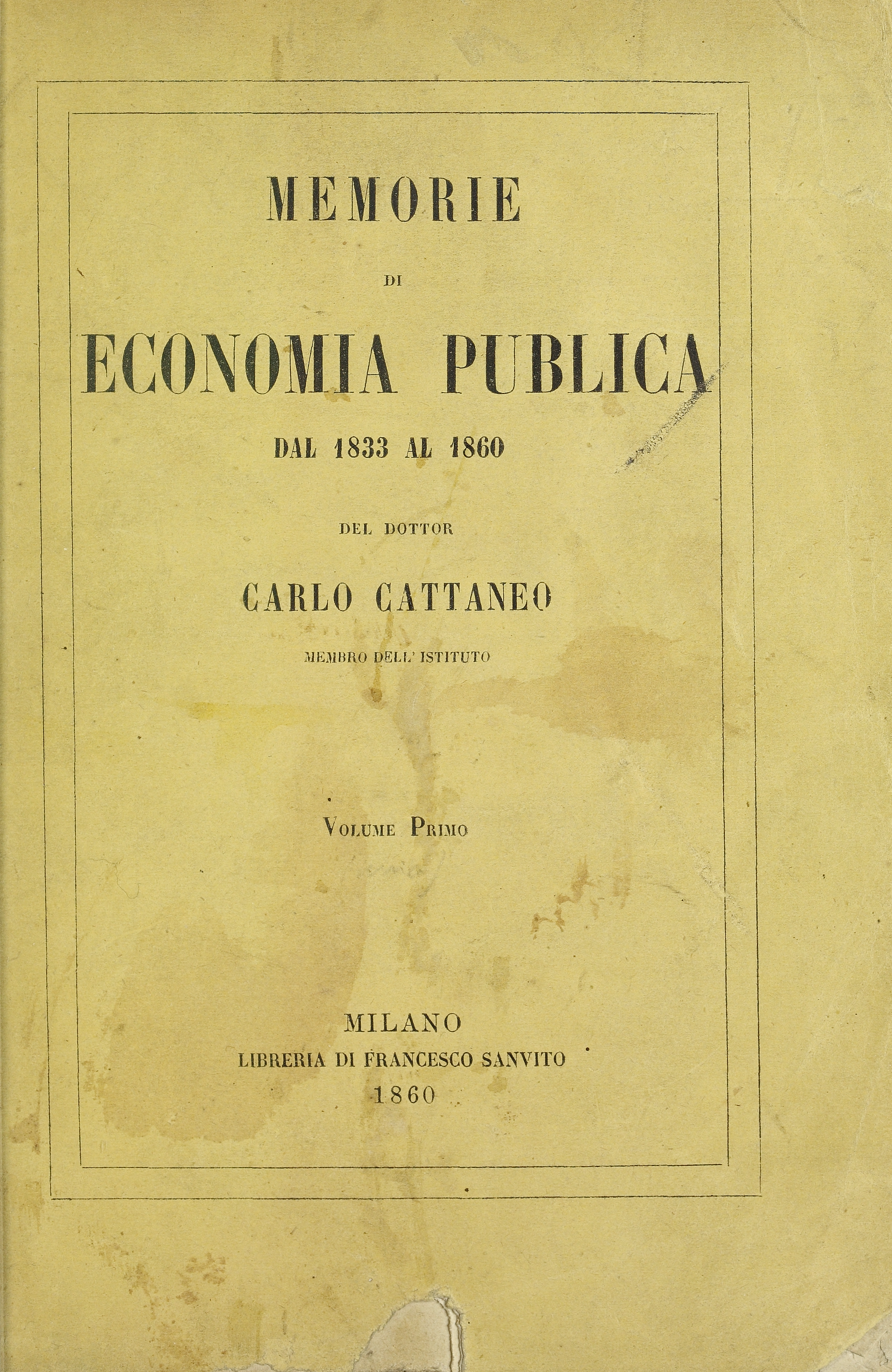
Memorie di economia pubblica dal 1833 al 1860, 1860

When the Austrians returned, in August 1848, Cattaneo fled Milan and took refuge in the canton of Ticino, Switzerland. In 1852 he became a professor of philosophy at the new lyceum of Lugano, where he taught until 1865, and played a decisive role in defining the institution's pedagogy.

He wrote his Storia della Rivoluzione del 1848 (History of the 1848 Revolution), the Archivio triennale delle cose d'Italia (3 vols., 1850–1855), then, early in 1860, he started publishing the Politecnico once more. In 1858, the Grand Council of Ticino awarded Cattaneo an honorary Swiss bourgeoisie.

Whiled exiled in Switzerland, Cattaneo continued to follow the events of Italian unification. He strongly opposed Camillo Benso di Cavour for his unitarian views and for the cession of Nice and Savoy to France in the Treaty of Turin. In 1860, Giuseppe Garibaldi summoned him to Naples to take part in the government of the Neapolitan provinces, but he would not agree to the union with Piedmont without local autonomy. After the establishment of the Kingdom of Italy he was frequently asked to stand for the Chamber of Deputies, but always refused because he could not conscientiously take the oath of allegiance to the monarchy. In 1868 the pressure of friends overcame his resistance, and he agreed to stand, but at the last moment he drew back, still unable to take the oath, and returned to Switzerland. He died on 6 February 1869 in Castagnola, Switzerland.

As a writer, Cattaneo was learned and brilliant, but some view him as being too bitter a partisan to be judicious, owing to his narrowly republican views. His ideas on local autonomy were wise, but, at a moment when unity was regarded as an absolute requisite, they were deemed inopportune. Gaetano Salvemini considered him one of 19th-century Italy's men of genius along with Giacomo Leopardi, Camillo Benso di Cavour, and Francesco de Sanctis.

== Published works by Cattaneo ==
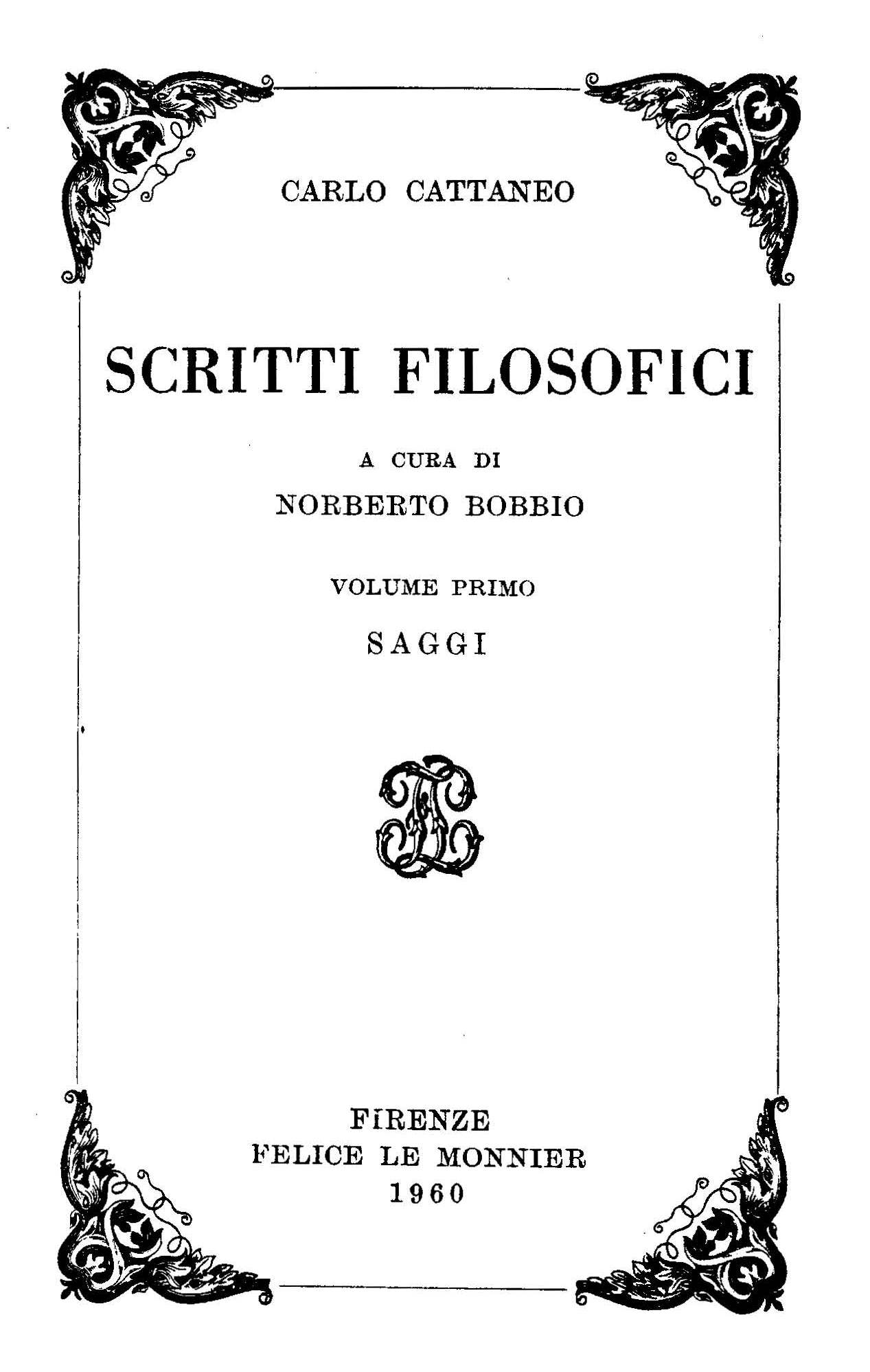
Scritti filosofici

- Interdizioni israelitiche, essay from the year 1836
- La città considerata come principio ideale delle istorie italiane
- Dell'India antica e moderna
- Notizie naturali e civili su la Lombardia
- Vita di Dante di Cesare Balbo
- Dell'Insurrezione di Milano nel 1848 e della successiva guerra

== See also ==
- Jessie White Mario
