= Giuseppe Grandi =

Italian sculptor (1843–1894)

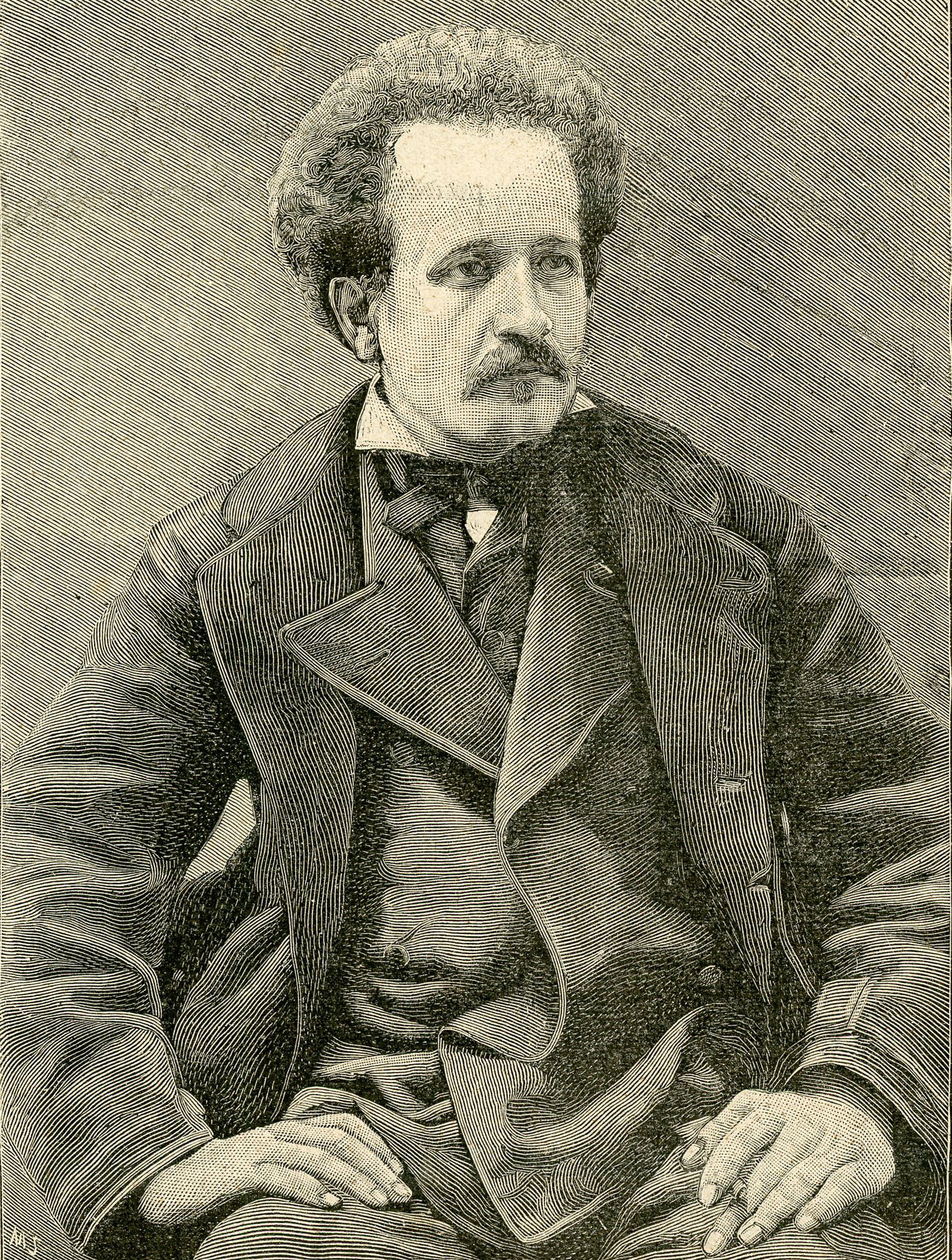
- Giuseppe Grandi
- Born: 17 October 1843; Valganna, Kingdom of Lombardy–Venetia
- Died: 30 November 1894 (aged 51); Valganna, Kingdom of Italy
- Known for: Sculpture
- Movement: Scapigliatura

Giuseppe Grandi (17 October 1843 – 30 November 1894) was an Italian sculptor.

== Life ==
=== Early life and education ===
Grandi was born in Valganna on 17 October 1843. He studied at the Brera Academy, Milan, where he exhibited a sculpture of Odysseus (Galleria d'Arte Moderna, Milan) in 1866; the work won a prize, but Grandi was accused of using a cast from life. In 1867 he moved to the Accademia Albertina in Turin, where one of his teachers, Odoardo Tabacchi, also from Valganna, invited him to work in his studio.

=== Scapigliatura ===
In 1869 he was again in Milan, where he joined the Lombard Scapigliatura school. The group favoured an impressionistic, ‘pictorial’ approach to sculpture, in which the sculptural masses seem about to dissolve into the atmosphere. Forgetting neoclassical smoothness and the lucidity of Romantic art, Grandi sought the luministic effects of painting in sculpture. He befriended the leading members of Milanese Scapigliatura, most notably Tranquillo Cremona and Daniele Ranzoni, and with them assumed a renewed anti-academist position and shared their common luministic research.

Grandi produced, in the Scapigliatura style, a sculpture of St. Thecla (1869) for Milan Cathedral, which contrasted sharply with Tabacchi’s St. Mary of Egypt (1863–7), also for the cathedral. This was followed in 1871 by the statue of Cesare Beccaria (Milan, Palazzo di Giustizia): although this work was apparently traditional in its pose and costume, the artist moved away from academic realism with his relaxed, disjointed treatment of the subject.

After Cesare Beccaria, Grandi’s work became increasingly more radical, concentrating on small- and medium-sized pieces. In 1873–4 he also experimented with etching, producing c. 12 plates in which, apart from the innovation of etchings produced in single editions, he showed a new affinity with the paintings of Daniele Ranzoni. These prints also express his desire to capture atmospheric values and the play of light and shadow on forms, for example the portraits of Antonio Billia (1874) and Carlo Borghi (1886; both in the Galleria d'Arte Moderna, Milan), in which the faces of the subjects are barely perceptible against the dark background.

=== Maturity ===
In 1873 Grandi exhibited at the Brera in Milan the Page of Lara (bronze version; Galleria d'Arte Moderna, Milan), which caused a public scandal because, while its inspiration was literary, it went against the taste of the Scapigliati with certain colouristic effects in the refined, detailed working of the material. Such portraits as that of Giuseppe Cremona (1873–80; Galleria d'Arte Moderna, Milan) went beyond naturalism, exemplifying Grandi’s new conception of sculpture; in the small bronze of Marshal Ney (1875–8; Galleria d'Arte Moderna, Milan), the unusual modelling, which dissolves the form with light, reveals Grandi already to be completely free from academic and romantic traditions.

From 1875 Grandi produced works that were undoubtedly studied by Leonardo Bistolfi, for example The Ivy (1878; Milan, Galleria d'Arte Moderna, Milan), the subject and style of which are similar to those of Tranquillo Cremona’s paintings and which anticipated the work of Medardo Rosso.

=== Commemorative sculptures ===
Grandi’s large commemorative sculptures show, if with less expressive force, the same pictorial approach and impressionistic effects as his plaster models and small bronze pieces. The monuments, which were free of both complex architectural forms and naturalistic representation, created varied effects in different kinds of light and from different points of view, for example the model (c. 1881; Galleria d'Arte Moderna, Milan) for a monument to Dante in Trento.

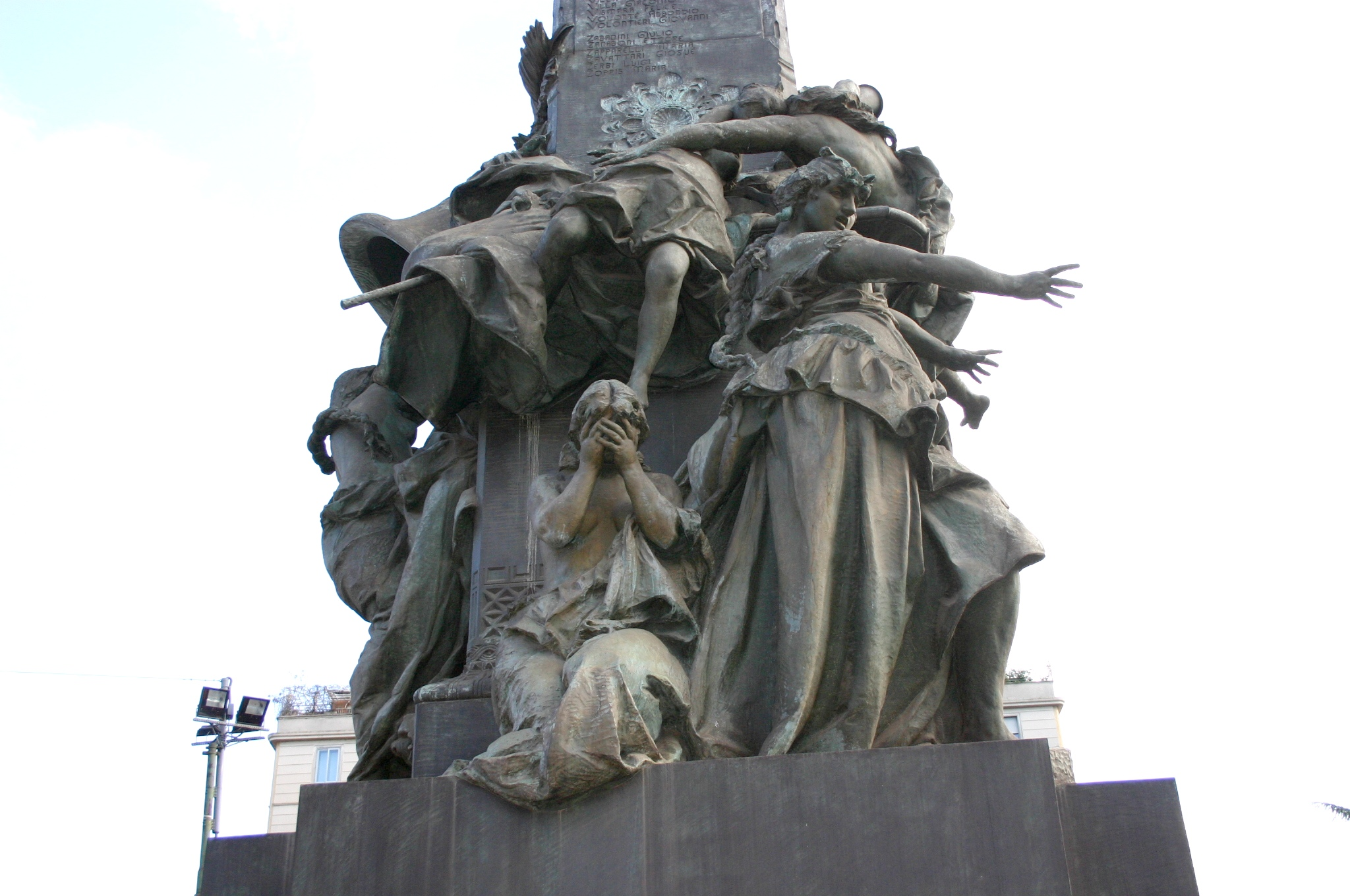
Obelisk monument to Five Days of Milan in memory of the popular uprising in 1848 against Austrian rule.

In 1881 the city of Milan held a competition for a monument commemorating the anti-Austrian uprisings of the Five Days of Milan (1848). Grandi’s plaster model, together with the two symbolic statues of the Exhortation at the Barricades and the Grief for the Fallen, won the contest. For thirteen years Grandi worked intensively at compositions, modelli, bronze casting, and even created a small menagerie of animals as live models for the work. For each of the Five Days he had many different and well-known models pose, but he died in 1894, before he could see his work inaugurated. The monument, inaugurated in 1895, is notable for its enormous scale and sense of movement.

== Gallery ==
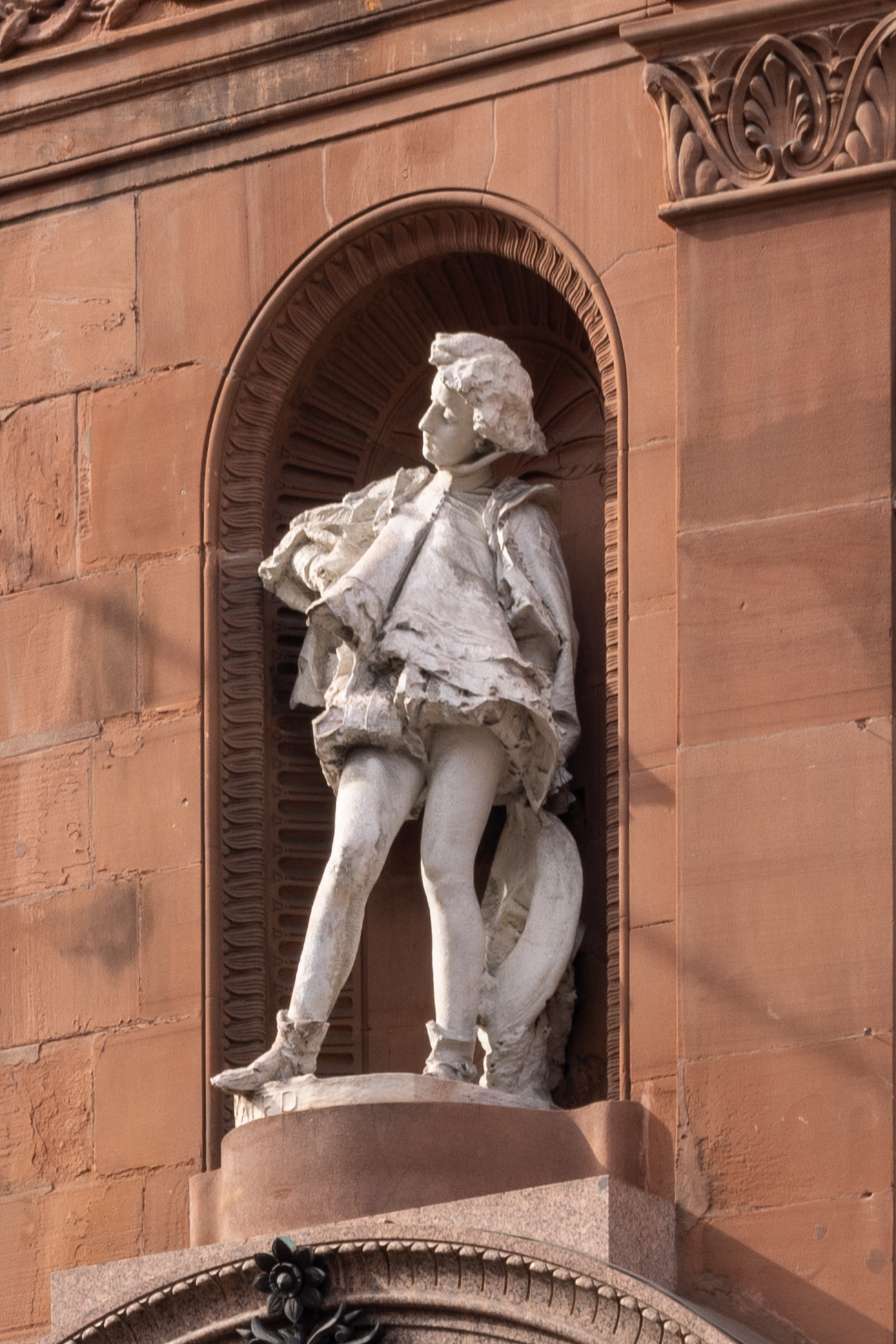
Kaled statue by Giuseppe Grandi on 193 Fleet Street on the corner of Chancery Lane, London

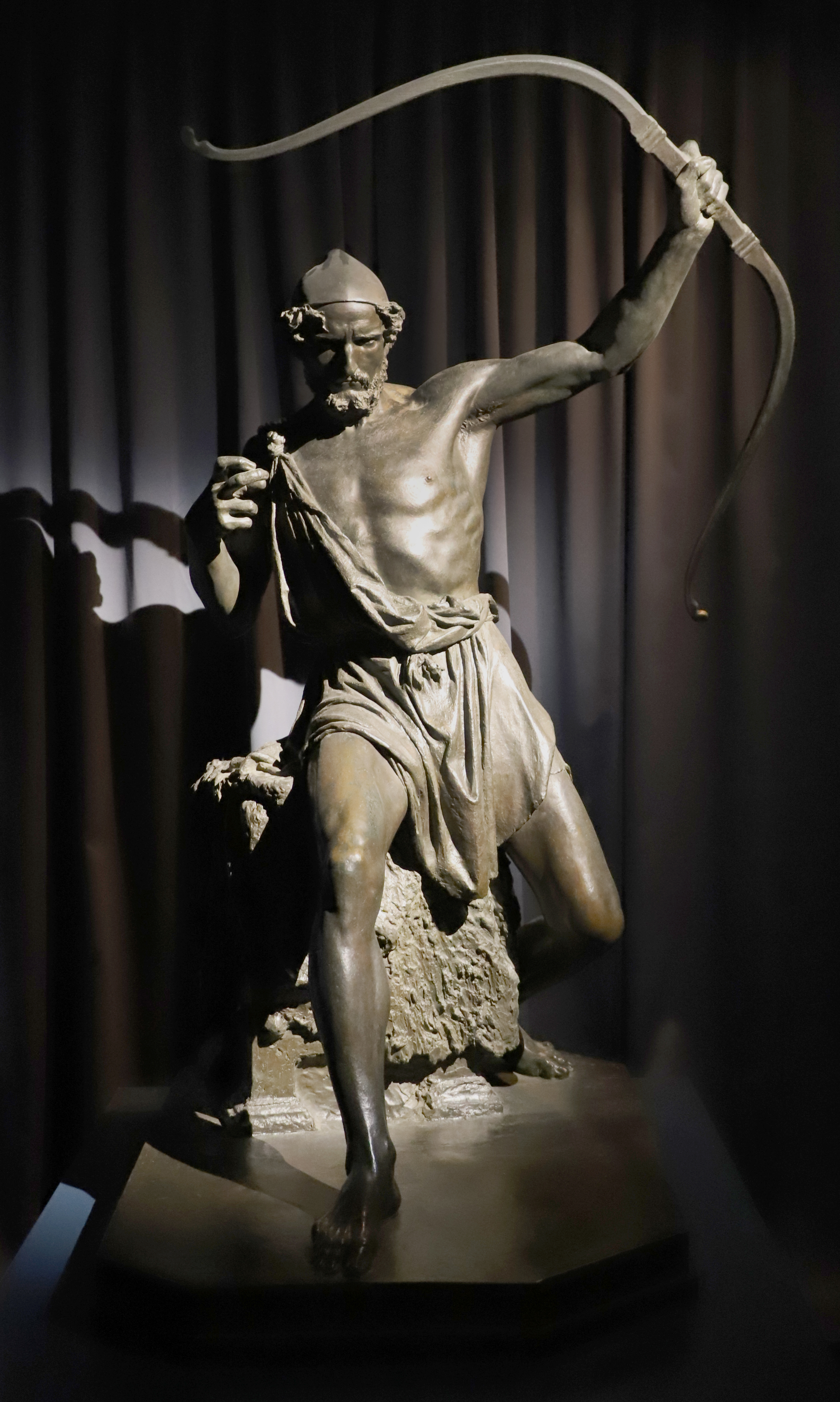
Odysseus, 1866

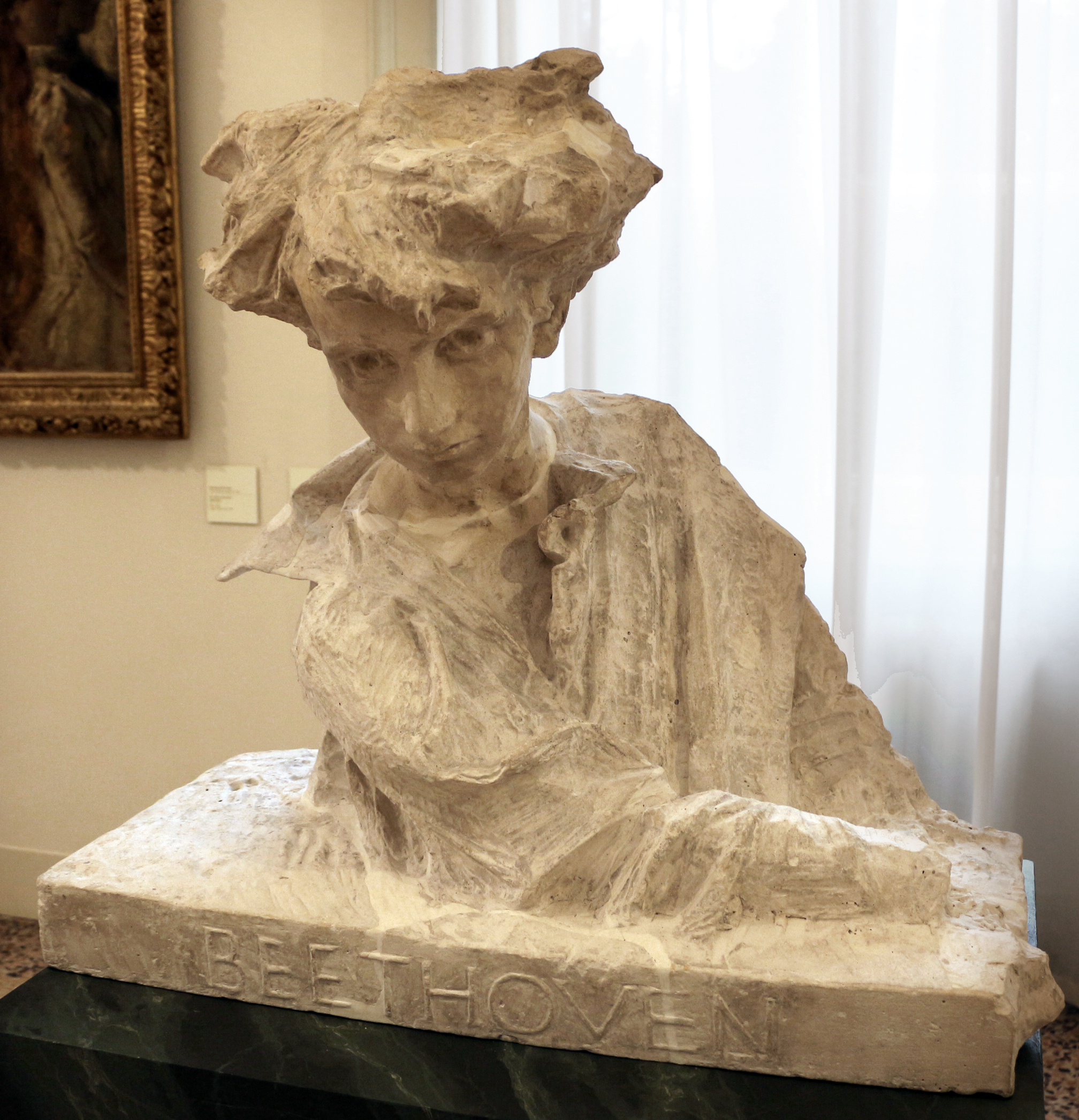
Beethoven, 1860-80

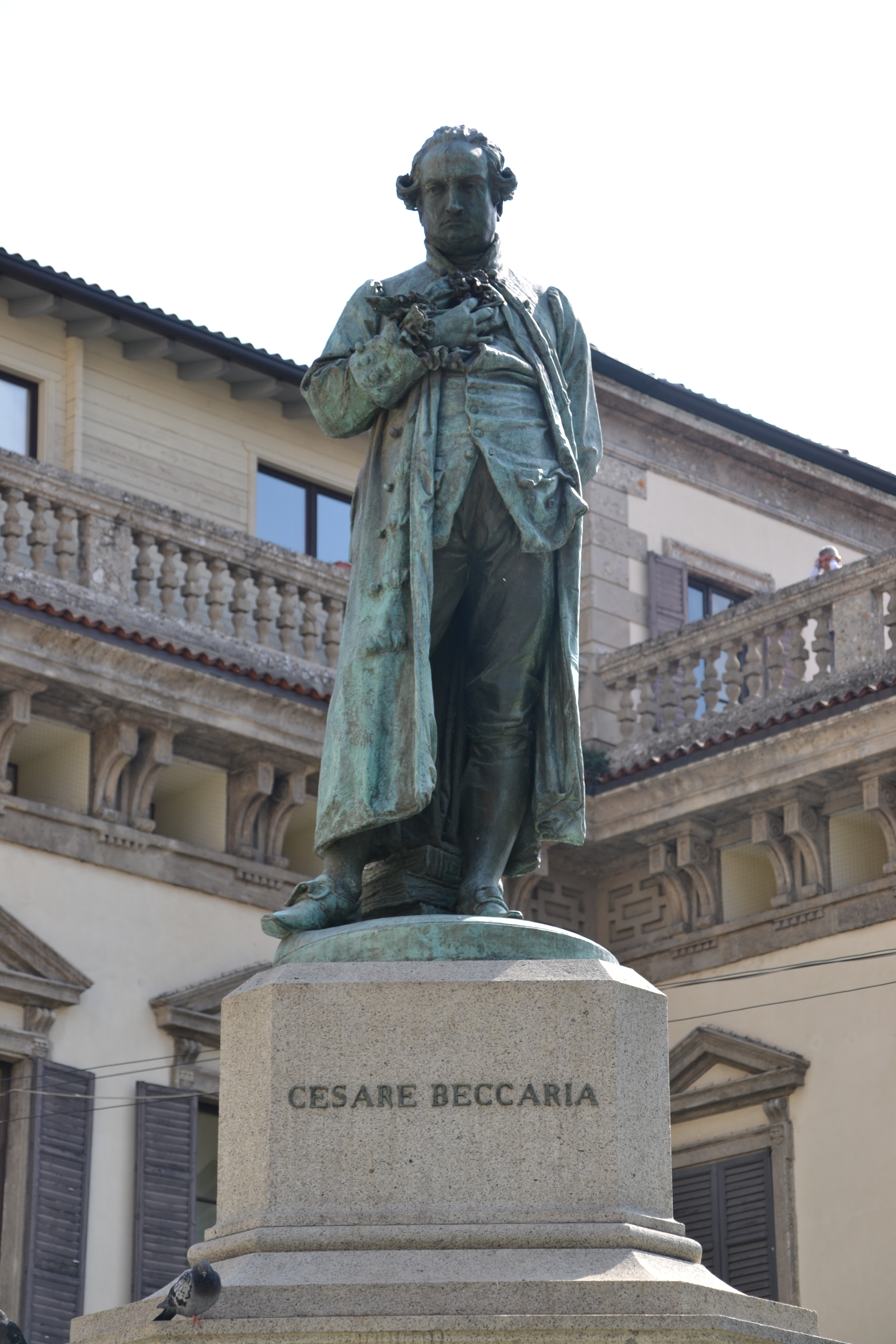
Cesare Beccaria

== Bibliography ==
- Calzini, Raffaele (1933). "GRANDI, Giuseppe Domenico". Enciclopedia Italiana. Rome: Istituto dell'Enciclopedia Italiana.
- Gariff, David, "Giuseppe Grandi (1843–1894) and the Milanese Scapigliatura." (Ph.D. dissertation), University of Maryland, College Park, Maryland, 1991.
