= Giuseppina Negroni Prati =

Italian patriot and philanthropist

Giuseppina Negroni Prati Morosini
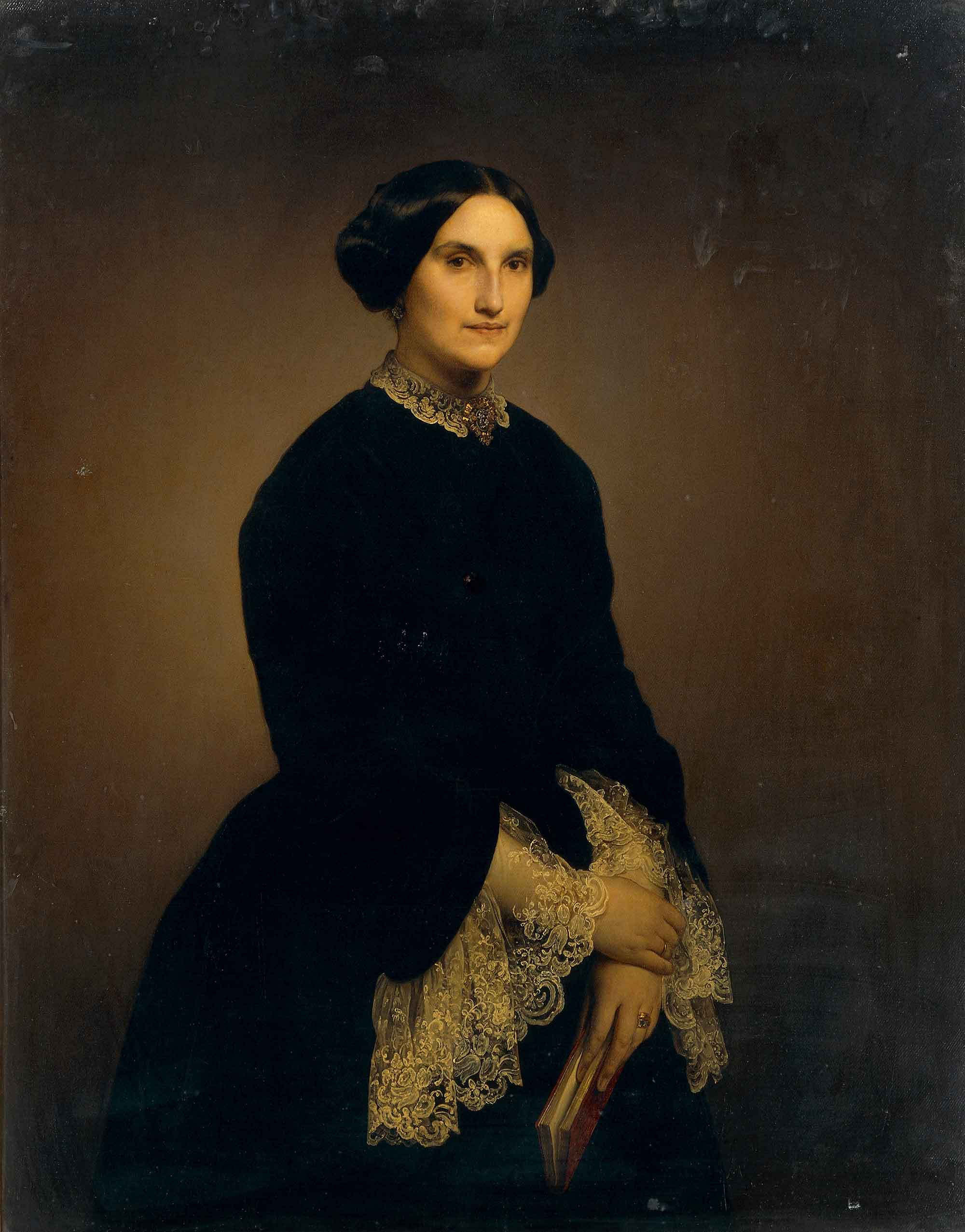
- Portrait of Giuseppina Negroni Prati Morosini by Francesco Hayez, 1853.
- Born: February 3, 1824; Lugano
- Died: March 16, 1909 (aged 85); Milan

Giuseppina Negroni Prati Morosini (3 February 1824 – 16 March 1909) was an Italian patriot and philanthropist who played a significant role in the Risorgimento movement and supported Italian independence during the 1848 revolutions. Born into a liberal aristocratic family, she maintained close ties with prominent 19th-century cultural figures, including composer Giuseppe Verdi and painter Francesco Hayez. After Italy's unification, she devoted herself to philanthropy, particularly in children's education.

== Early life and background ==
=== Family and upbringing ===
Giuseppina was born in Lugano, the third daughter of Giovanni Battista Morosini (1782–1874), a Lugano nobleman, lawyer, deputy, and member of the Ticino Grand Council, and Emilia Maria Magdalena Taddhei Zeltner (1804–1875). Her mother was the daughter of Franz Xaver Zeltner, a Swiss aristocrat from Solothurn who served as bailiff of Lugano between 1793 and 1794. Raised with liberal ideals and patriotic values, the family was influenced by Emilia's connection to Polish general and patriot Tadeusz Kościuszko, fostering a spirit of cultural openness and resistance to Austrian rule in Lombardy.

=== Villa Negroni and patriotic hub ===
The Morosini family owned Villa Negroni in Vezia, near Lugano, which became a gathering place for Italian patriots and political exiles during the revolutionary period. This aristocratic residence shaped the patriotic ideals of Giuseppina and her brother Emilio.

== Role in the Risorgimento (1848–1860) ==
=== 1848 Revolution and Five Days of Milan ===
During the 1848 revolutions, particularly the Five Days of Milan, Giuseppina, alongside her mother and sisters, actively supported Italian patriots. The family provided shelter to exiles, cared for wounded insurgents, and financially supported the independence movement. Giuseppina's brother, Emilio Morosini (1830–1849), fought in the Five Days of Milan and later in the defense of the Roman Republic. He died in Rome in 1849 alongside patriots Luciano Manara and Enrico Dandolo, who was engaged to Giuseppina's sister Annetta. After Enrico's death, Emilia withdrew from public life, but Giuseppina continued her support for Italian independence.

=== Marriage and move to Milan ===
In 1851, Giuseppina married Alessandro Negroni Prati (1809–1870), a Milanese engineer and widower with conservative, pro-Austrian views. They had four children: Antonietta, Luisa (born 1857), Giovanni Antonio, and Vincenzo.

=== Public engagement and press ===
In 1860, during preparations for Giuseppe Garibaldi's Expedition of the Thousand, Giuseppina organized fundraising efforts to support the campaign. She also participated in initiatives linked to the patriotic newspaper La Perseveranza.

== Relationship with Giuseppe Verdi ==
Giuseppina was friends with the composer Giuseppe Verdi for over half a century. She met him in 1842 at the Morosini family's Lombardy residence through a mutual acquaintance, journalist Luigi Toccagni. Their close relationship, marked by mutual respect and extensive correspondence, lasted until Verdi's death in 1901.

Some historical accounts suggest an emotional connection based on the affectionate tone of Verdi's letters, though modern scholarship attributes this to the social conventions of Lombard aristocratic salons at that time rather than a deeper romantic involvement.

Some of Verdi's letters and memorabilia belonging to the Morosini family are preserved at the Museo Teatrale alla Scala in Milan, within the Anna and Giuseppina Morosini and Casati collections.

== Artistic interests ==
=== Francesco Hayez portrait ===
In 1853, Francesco Hayez painted Giuseppina's portrait, commissioned by her husband, Count Alessandro. The artwork was exhibited at the annual Brera Academy exhibition in Milan and is now housed in the Pinacoteca Ambrosiana and stands as evidence of her connections with the cultural and artistic circles of the city in the mid-nineteenth century.

Hayez was Giuseppina's painting teacher. Between 1869 and 1875, she collected the painter's recollections. After his death, she donated them to the Brera Academy, where they were published in 1890 as Le mie memorie dettate da Francesco Hayez, serving as an important source for the artist's biography and work.

== Philanthropy and later years ==
=== Philanthropic work ===
Following Italy's unification and her parents' deaths, Giuseppina inherited Villa Vezia in Lugano and focused on philanthropy, particularly in children's education. In Gorla Maggiore, Province of Varese, she donated a property to establish a kindergarten.

=== Recognition and final years ===
In 1882, a royal decree authorized Giuseppina to pass the Morosini coat of arms to her legitimate and natural descendants. In 1886, King Umberto I granted her, motu proprio, the title of countess, transferable to her son Giovanni Antonio Negroni Prati Morosini, in recognition of the Morosini family's patriotic contributions, particularly Emilio's sacrifice during the 1849 defense of the Roman Republic.

Giuseppina died in Milan on 16 March 1909 and was buried in her husband's family chapel in Pessano con Bornago, Province of Milan.
