= Enrico =

- Pronunciation: [enˈriːko]
- Gender: Masculine
- Name day: 13 July

Other gender
- Feminine: Enrica

Origin
- Languages: Germanic, via Italian
- Meaning: "homeowner"

Other names
- Related names: Henry, Henri, Enrique, Hendrik

Enrico is an Italian masculine given name which means homeowner, or king, derived from Heinrich of Germanic origin. It is also a given name in Ladino. Equivalents in other languages are Henry (English), Henri (French), Enrique (Spanish), Henrique (Portuguese) and Hendrik (Dutch). Notable people and fictional characters with the name include:

== People ==
=== A ===
- Enrico Albertosi (born 1939), Italian football goalkeeper
- Enrico Alfonso (born 1988), Italian football goalkeeper
- Enrico Alvino (1808–1872), Italian architect and urban designer
- Enrico Annoni (born 1966), Italian footballer
- Enrico Arrigoni (1894–1986), Italian individualist anarchist

=== B ===
- Enrico Baj (1924–2003), Italian artist and art writer
- Enrico Banducci (1922–2007), American impresario
- Enrico Barone (1859–1924), Italian economist
- Enrico Benzing (1932–2026), Italian engineer and journalist
- Enrico Berlinguer (1923–1984), Italian politician
- Enrico Bertaggia (born 1964), Italian racing driver
- Enrico Betti (1823–1892), Italian mathematician
- Enrico Blasi (born 1972), Canadian hockey coach
- Enrico Bocchieri, American computer engineer
- Enrico Bombieri (born 1940), Italian mathematician
- Enrico Boselli (born 1957), Italian politician
- Enrico Brizzi (born 1974), Italian writer

=== C ===
- Enrico Caruso (1873–1921), Italian opera singer
- Enrico Castelnuovo (1839–1915), Italian writer
- Enrico Caterino Davila (1576–1631), Italian historian
- Enrico Caviglia (1862–1945), Italian army officer
- Enrico Cecchetti (1850–1928), Italian ballet dancer
- Enrico Celio (1889–1980), Swiss politician
- Enrico Chiesa (born 1970), Italian football striker
- Enrico Cialdini (1811–1892), Italian soldier, politician, and diplomat
- Enrico Ciccone (born 1970), Canadian ice hockey defenceman
- Enrico Clementi (1931–2021), Italian pioneer in computational techniques for quantum chemistry and molecular dynamics
- Enrico Cocozza (1921–1997), Scottish filmmaker
- Enrico Colantoni (born 1963), Canadian actor
- Enrico Corradini (1865–1931), Italian novelist, essayist, journalist, and nationalist
- Enrico Cosenz (1820–1898), Italian soldier
- Enrico Cuccia (1907–2000), Italian banker

=== D ===
- Enrico Dandolo (c. 1107–1205), Doge of the city-state of Venice
- Enrico Dandolo (patriarch) (died 1182), uncle of the doge and patriarch of Grado, Italy
- Enrico Dandolo (patriot) (1827–1849), soldier in the Italian Risorgimento
- Enrico Dante (1884–1967), Italian Roman Catholic prelate
- Enrico David (born 1966), Italian artist
- Enrico De Angelis (1920–2018), Italian singer
- Enrico de Lorenzo (1933–2021), Italian bobsledder
- Enrico De Nicola (1877–1959), Italian jurist, journalist, and politician
- Enrico Degano (born 1976), Italian road bicycle racer
- Enrico Di Giuseppe (1932–2005), American operatic tenor
- Enrico Donati (1909–2008), American surrealist painter and sculptor

=== E ===
- Enrico Echiverri (born 1954), Filipino politician

=== F ===
- Enrico Fabris (born 1981), Italian long-track speed skater
- Enrico Fantini (born 1976), Italian footballer
- Enrico Fazzini (21st century), American neurologist
- Enrico Fermi (1901–1954), Italian-American physicist
- Enrico Ferri (criminologist) (1856–1929), Italian criminologist
- Enrico Ferri (politician) (born 1942), Italian politician and magistrate
- Enrico Forlanini (1848–1930), Italian engineer, inventor, and aeronautical pioneer
- Enrico Franzoi (born 1982), Italian cyclo-cross and road bicycle racer

=== G ===
- Enrico Gamba (1831–1883), Italian artist
- Enrico Garbuglia (1900–2007), Italian centenarian
- Enrico Gasparotto (born 1982), Italian road racing cyclist
- Enrico Gasparri (1871–1946), Roman Catholic cardinal and archbishop
- Enrico Gatti (born 1955), Italian classical violinist
- Enrico Gentile (born 1921), Italian singer
- Enrico Ghezzi (born 1952), Italian cinema critic, writer, actor, film director, and screenwriter
- Enrico Gilardi (born 1957), Italian basketball player
- Enrico Giovannini (born 1957), Italian economist and statistician
- Enrico Guicciardi (1812–1895), Italian colonel and senator
- Enrico Hillyer Giglioli (1845–1909), Italian zoologist and anthropologist

=== H ===
- Enrico Haffner (1640–1702), Italian painter

=== K ===
- Enrico Kern (born 1979), German football coach and former player
- Enrico Komning (born 1968), German politician
- Enrico Kühn (born 1977), German bobsledder

=== L ===
- Enrico La Loggia (born 1947), Italian politician
- Enrico Letta (born 1966), Italian politician
- Enrico Lo Verso (born 1964), Italian actor
- Enrico Lorenzetti (1911–1989), Italian Grand Prix motorcycle road racer

=== M ===
- Enrico Henry Mancini (1924–1994), American composer, conductor, arranger, pianist, and flutist
- Enrico Macias (born 1938), Algerian-born French Jewish singer
- Enrico Mainardi (1897–1976), Italian cellist, composer, and conductor
- Enrico V. Maltese (born 1952), Italian Byzantinist and professor
- Enrico Marconi (1792–1863), Italian-born Polish architect
- Enrico Marini (born 1969), Swiss comic artist
- Enrico Mattei (1906–1962), Italian public administrator
- Enrico Minutoli (died 1412), Italian cardinal
- Enrico Misasi (born 1994), Brazilian politician
- Enrico Mizzi (1885–1950), Maltese politician
- Enrico Morin (1841–1910), Italian admiral and politician

=== N ===
- Enrico Cardoso Nazaré (born 1984), known as Enrico, Brazilian footballer
- Enrico Nardi (1907–1966), Italian racing car driver, engineer, and designer
- Enrico Nascimbeni (1959–2019), Italian singer, journalist, and poet
- Enrico Nigiotti (born 1987), Italian singer-songwriter
- Enrico Nizzi (born 1990), Italian cross-country skier

=== P ===
- Enrico Pace (born 1967), Italian pianist
- Enrico Paoli (1908–2005), Italian chess master
- Enrico Pedrini (1940–2012), Italian theorist and collector of conceptual art
- Enrico Perucconi (1925–2020), Italian sprinter
- Enrico Pessina (1828–1916), Italian philosopher, lawyer and politician
- Enrico Pieranunzi (born 1949), Italian jazz pianist
- Enrico Platé (1909–1954), Italian motor racing driver and team manager
- Enrico Poitschke (born 1969), German road racing cyclist

=== R ===
- Enrico Rastelli (1896–1931), Italian juggler, acrobat, and performer
- Enrico Rava (born 1939), Italian avant-garde jazz musician
- Enrico Rocca (1847–1915), Italian violin maker
- Enrico Rosenbaum (1944–1979), American songwriter, arranger, producer, guitarist, and singer
- Enrico Ruggeri (born 1957), Italian singer-songwriter

=== S ===
- Enrico degli Scrovegni (died 1336), Paduan money lender, patron of the painter Giotto
- Enrico Maria Salerno (1926–1994), Italian theatre and film actor
- Enrico Sabbatini (1932–1998), Italian costume designer and production designer
- Enrico Sertoli (1842–1910), Italian physiologist and histologist
- Enrico Sgrulletti (born 1965), Italian hammer thrower
- Enrico Sibilia (1861–1948), Italian Roman Catholic cardinal
- Enrico Stefani (1869–1955), Italian architect and archaeologist
- Enrico Strydom (born 1992), South African National Pool Player

=== T ===
- Enrico Tameleo (1901–1985), Italian-American mobster
- Enrico Teodorani (born 1970), Italian comic book creator, creator of Djustine
- Enrico Toccacelo (born 1978), Italian auto racer
- Enrico Toselli (1883–1926), Italian pianist and composer
- Enrico Toti (1882–1916), Italian cyclist, posthumously awarded the Gold Medal of Military Valor in World War I

=== V ===
- Enrico Valtorta (1883–1951), Italian-born, first Roman Catholic bishop of Hong Kong
- Enrico Verson (1845–1927), Italian entomologist
- Enrico Viarisio (1897–1979), Italian theatre and cinema actor
- Enrico Villanueva (born 1980), Filipino basketball player

=== W ===
- Enrico Wijngaarde (born 1974), Surinamese football referee

=== Z ===
- Enrico Zuccalli (c. 1640–1724), Swiss architect
- Enrico Zuppi (1909–1992), Italian journalist and photographer

== Fictional characters ==
- Enrico Marini (Resident Evil), from the Resident Evil video game series
- Enrico Matassa, an alias of the character Hank Venture from the show The Venture Bros.
- Enrico Maxwell, from the manga and anime series Hellsing
- Enrico Poët, a main character in Italian television series The Law According to Lidia Poët
- Enrico Pollini, played by Rowan Atkinson in the film Rat Race
- Enrico Pucci (JoJo's Bizarre Adventure), from the Japanese manga JoJo's Bizarre Adventure

== See also ==
- Errico
