= Emilia Morosini =

Swiss cultural patron and patriot (1804–1875)

Emilia Morosini Zeltner
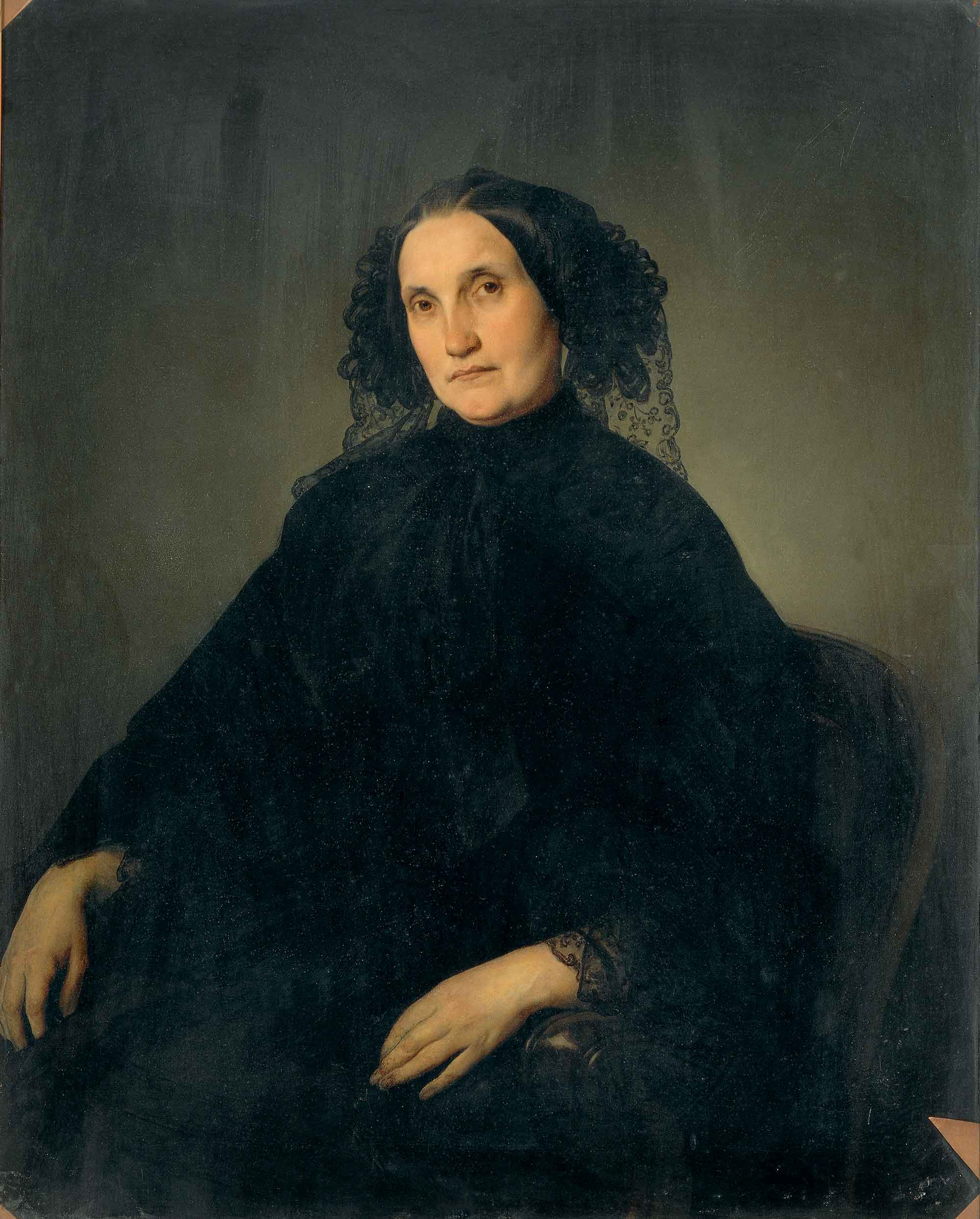
- Portrait of Emilia Morosini Zeltner by Francesco Hayez, 1852
- Born: July 16, 1804; Solothurn
- Died: July 11, 1875 (aged 70); Vezia
- Occupations: Cultural patron, patriot

Emilia Morosini Zeltner (16 July 1804 – 11 July 1875) was a Swiss cultural patron and patriot who supported the Risorgimento movement. She was the caretaker of Tadeusz Kościuszko's heart, a relic entrusted to her family. At her residence, Villa Negroni in Vezia, she hosted a cultural salon that welcomed Italian patriots, political exiles, and prominent artists.

== Biography ==
Emilia was born in Solothurn, Switzerland, to Franz Xaver Zeltner (1764–1835), a Swiss official and prefect of the Canton of Solothurn, and Ursula Peri Zeltner (1764–1826). In 1819, she married Giovanni Battista Morosini (1782–1874) and relocated to Vezia, Canton of Ticino, settling at Villa Negroni. Constructed in the late 17th and early 18th centuries by Carlo Morosini, the villa became a hub for political exiles, patriots, and artists. Emilia and Giovanni had six children: a son, Emilio, and daughters Giuseppina, Carolina, Luigia, Annetta, and Cristina.

=== Connection to Tadeusz Kościuszko ===
Emilia's father, Franz Xaver Zeltner, was a close friend of Tadeusz Kościuszko, hosting him in Solothurn from 1815 to 1817. After Kościuszko's death on 15 October 1817, his embalmed heart was entrusted to the Zeltner family per his wishes. Following her 1819 marriage, Emilia brought the relic to Villa Negroni, where it was preserved in the family mausoleum. In 1895, the urn containing the heart was transferred to the Polish Museum in Rapperswil, and in 1927, it was moved to the Royal Castle in Warsaw.

== Role in the Risorgimento ==
Emilia and her family were deeply involved in the Risorgimento movement. During the Five Days of Milan (18–22 March 1848), an uprising against Austrian rule, she hosted members of the Provisional Government of Lombardy at Villa Negroni. This rebellion marked one of the first armed insurrections against Austrian dominance in Italy. Alongside her daughters, Emilia provided aid to the wounded, supplied provisions to the military, and raised funds for the insurgents.

Her son, Emilio, died at the age of 19 while defending the Roman Republic in 1849. He was severely wounded on 29 June 1849 during battles on the Janiculum Hill near Porta San Pancrazio, fighting alongside Luciano Manara (who died on 30 June 1849), and succumbed to his injuries on 1 July 1849, becoming a martyr for Italian independence.

Emilia's daughters, Giuseppina and Carolina, supported the patriot cause by organizing a care center for the wounded at the family home. Villa Negroni evolved into a cultural salon, hosting figures such as Giuseppe Verdi, Arrigo Boito, and Francesco Hayez, while remaining under Austrian surveillance due to the family's patriotic activities.

== Portrait by Hayez ==
In 1852, Francesco Hayez, a prominent Romantic Italian painter, painted a portrait of Emilia. Commissioned by Emilia herself, the painting was displayed at the annual exhibition of the Brera Academy in Milan in 1852. The portrait is now part of the collection at the Pinacoteca Ambrosiana in Milan.

== Villa Negroni mausoleum ==
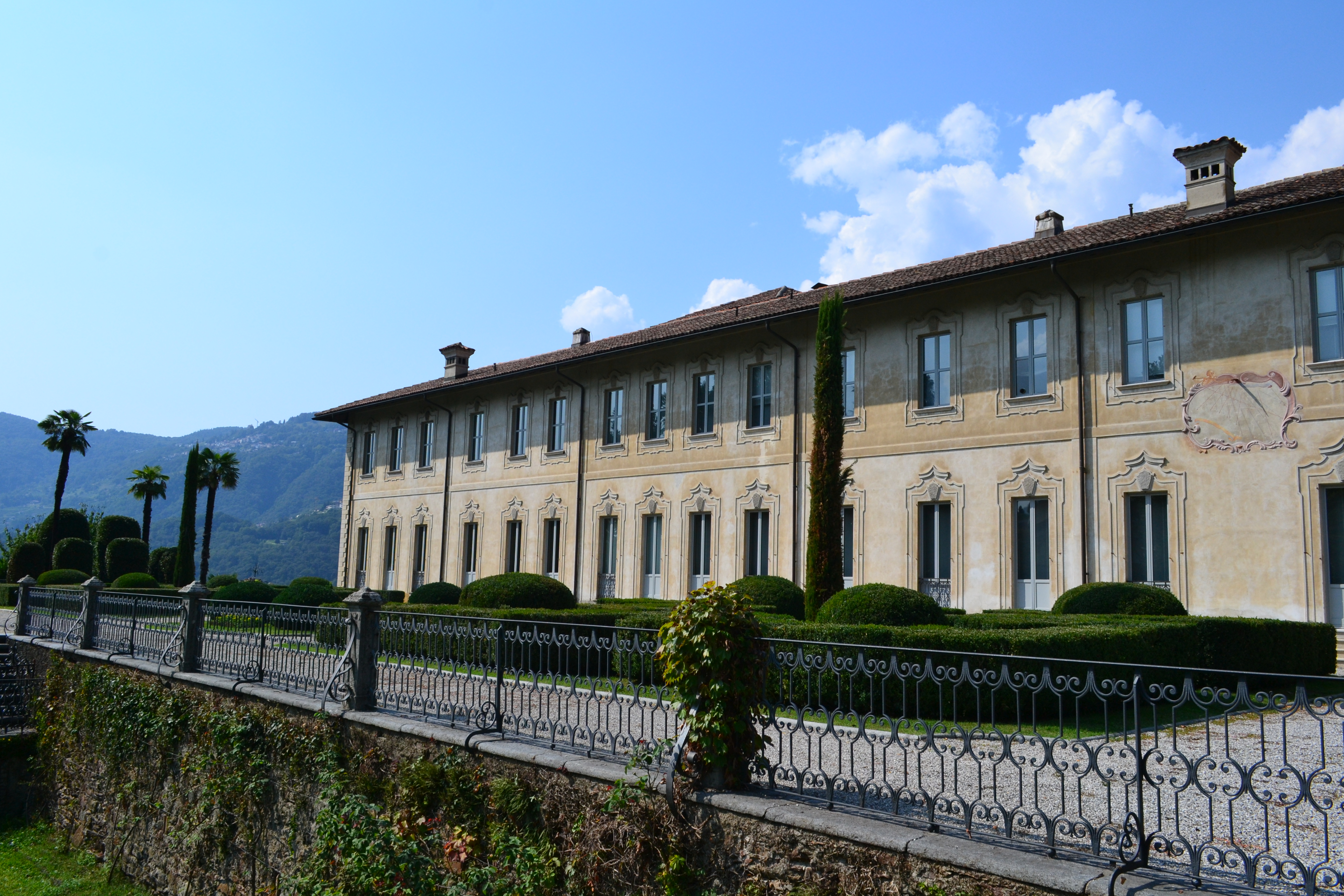
Villa Negroni in Vezia

In the Villa Negroni mausoleum, alongside Kościuszko's heart, Emilia interred her son Emilio, as well as other young fighters for Italian independence, including Enrico Dandolo and Luciano Manara.

== Death ==
Emilia Morosini Zeltner died on 11 July 1875 at Villa Negroni in Vezia, aged 70.
