= Giovanni Battista Morosini =

Swiss-Austrian lawyer and politician

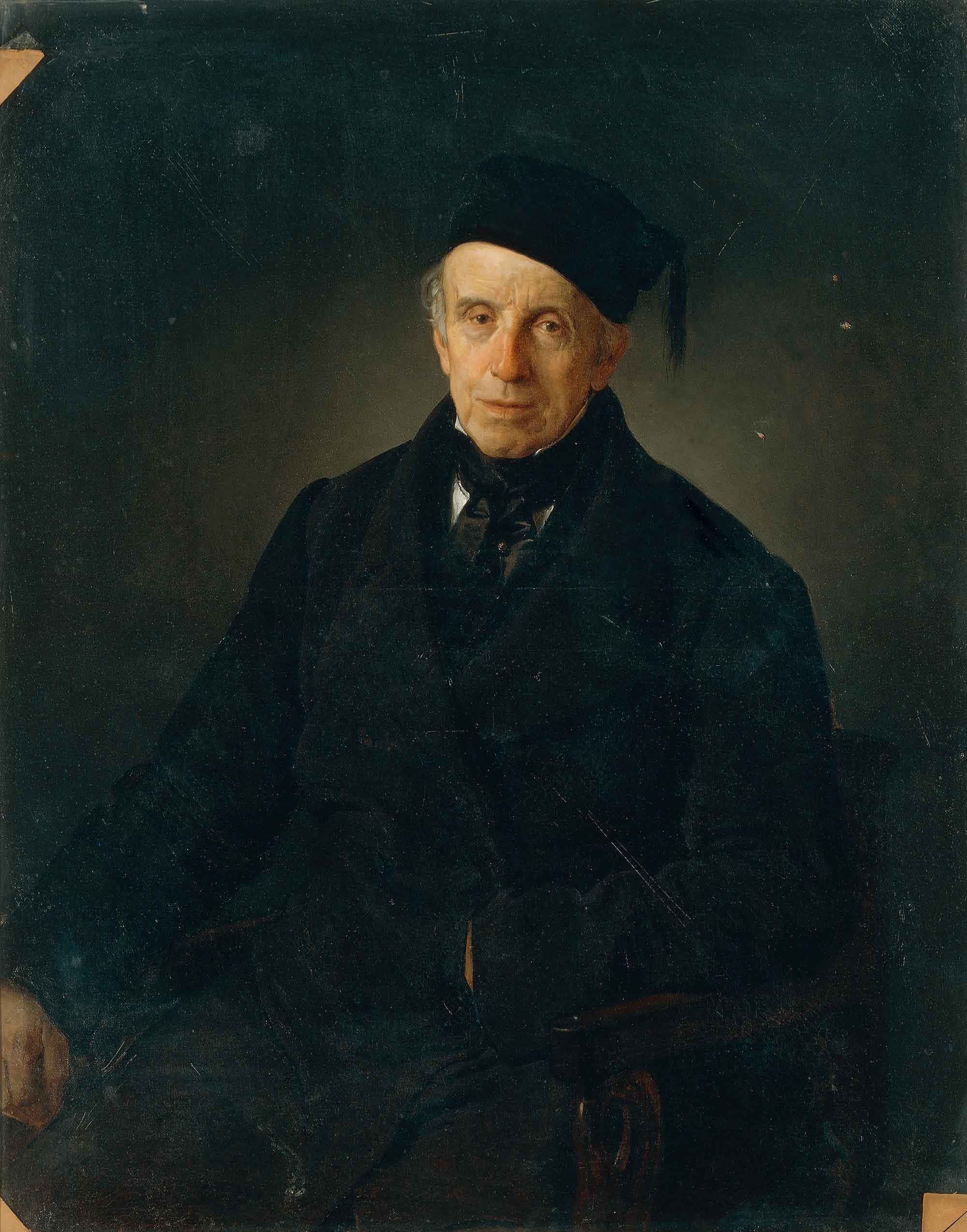
- Portrait by Francesco Hayez (1854)
- Born: 8 March 1782; Lugano
- Died: 9 April 1874 (aged 92); Milan
- Occupations: Lawyer, politician, judge
- Spouse: Emilia Zeltner (m. 1819)
- Children: 6

Giovanni Battista Morosini (8 March 1782 – 9 April 1874) was a Swiss lawyer, politician, and judge who served as a member of the Grand Council and Council of State of the Canton of Ticino. In 1842, he became an Austrian citizen, formally renouncing his Swiss citizenship in 1860. Born into the aristocratic Morosini family, he was in touch with independence activists, including figures from the Risorgimento. His family was involved in revolutionary events, and his son Emilio became a martyr of Italian unification. However, Morosini's own political stance was considerably more moderate and pro-Austrian than that of his wife and children.

== Biography ==
Giovanni Battista Morosini was the son of Giuseppe Carlo Pompeo Maria Morosini and Marianna Bossi. In 1819, he married Emilia Zeltner (born 16 July 1804 in Solothurn), daughter of Franz Xaver Zeltner, a Swiss official and head of the Canton of Solothurn. The marriage resulted in six children: a son, Emilio, and daughters Giuseppina, Carolina, Luigia, Annetta, and Cristina. In 1829 and 1830, the family resided in Varese, where Emilio was born.

=== Political and legal career ===
During the restoration period following the Congress of Vienna, Morosini was an influential figure in Ticino cantonal politics. From 1813 to 1815, he served in the Grand Council of the canton, presiding over it in 1814. Also during 1813–1815, he was member of the Council of State, the cantonal government.

After finishing his political career, Morosini served as a judge on the cantonal appellate court, first from 1815, and again from 1829.

=== Connections with the liberation movement ===
In 1833, Morosini served as a lawyer for Princess Cristina Trivulzio Belgiojoso, a prominent figure of the Italian Risorgimento engaged in the Italian independence movement.

Morosini's wife, Emilia Zeltner, actively supported Italian independence aspirations. The family was deeply committed to Risorgimento events. During the Milan uprising in March 1848, known as the Five Days of Milan (18–22 March), Emilia gathered members of the Provisional Government of Lombardy in her home. This was one of the first armed uprisings against Austrian domination in Italy. Emilia, along with her daughters, organized aid for the wounded, supplied provisions to the army, and raised funds for the insurgents. Villa Negroni in Vezia was transformed into a cultural salon, visited by figures such as Giuseppe Verdi, Arrigo Boito, and Francesco Hayez, while simultaneously being under observation by Austrian authorities due to its patriotic sympathies.

=== Austrian citizenship and controversies ===
In 1842, Giovanni Battista Morosini accepted Austrian citizenship, a controversial decision given his earlier connections to independence movements. In 1860, he formally renounced his Swiss citizenship. His political stance was considerably more moderate and pro-Austrian than that of his wife and children, who were actively involved in independence activities.

Emilia Morosini was the daughter of Franz Xaver Zeltner, in whose house in Solothurn Tadeusz Kościuszko, the Polish general and national hero, lived during the last years of his life (1815–1817). After Kościuszko's death on 15 October 1817, his embalmed heart and personal documents were bequeathed to the Zeltner family in his will. After her marriage in 1819, Emilia brought the relic to the Morosini family residence, Villa Negroni in Vezia. According to information from the Pinacoteca Ambrosiana, Morosini handed over documents that previously belonged to Kościuszko to Austrian authorities in exchange for a promise of being granted a count's title, but the Austrian authorities never fulfilled this pledge. This decision, demonstrating Morosini's pragmatism and pro-Austrian sympathies, stood in stark contrast to the patriotism of his wife and children.

=== Portrait by Francesco Hayez ===
In 1854, the renowned Italian painter Francesco Hayez painted a portrait of Giovanni Battista Morosini commissioned by his daughter. The signed and dated portrait was exhibited at the Accademia di Belle Arti di Brera in 1859. Hayez himself considered this work one of his most successful portraits in terms of both likeness and painterly technique. The portrait depicts an elderly man dressed in informal indoor clothing, painted with great realism. The painting is now in the collection of the Pinacoteca Ambrosiana in Milan.

== Family ==
Morosini's son, Emilio (born 26 June 1830 in Varese, died 1 July 1849), was one of the most renowned figures of the Risorgimento. He participated in the Milan uprising in March 1848, fighting alongside Luciano Manara and the brothers Enrico and Emilio Dandolo. In 1849, Emilio fought in defense of the Roman Republic. He was severely wounded on 29 June 1849 while fighting on the Janiculum Hill at Porta San Pancrazio against French forces and died a few days later, on 1 July 1849. He became a martyr of Italian independence. He was buried in the mausoleum at Villa Negroni alongside Enrico Dandolo and Luciano Manara.

Morosini's daughters, particularly Giuseppina (born 3 February 1824, died 16 March 1909) and Carolina, supported the patriots. Giuseppina organized a care center for the wounded and managed supplies for the troops. She was a friend of Giuseppe Verdi and maintained a long correspondence with him.

== Death ==
Giovanni Battista Morosini died on 9 April 1874 in Milan.
