= Enrica =

Enrica is a female Italian given name, a feminine form of Enrico (Henry). Notable people with the name include:

- Enrica Alifano (born 1967), Italian politics
- Enrica Antonioni (born 1952), Italian film director and actress
- Enrica Bonaccorti (1949–2026), Italian actress and television presenter
- Enrica Bordignon (born 1975), Italian chemist and Chair of Electron Spin Resonance
- Enrica Calabresi (1891–1944), Italian zoologist
- Enrica Cipolloni (born 1990), Italian heptathlete
- Enrica Detragiache, American economist
- Enrica Clay Dillon (1885–1946), American opera singer, director and voice teacher
- Enrica Follieri (1926–1999), Italian philologist and paleographer
- Enrica Malcovati (1894-1990), Italian Classical philologist
- Enrica Marasca (born 1983), Italian lightweight rower
- Enrica Merlo (born 1988), Italian volleyball player
- Enrica Maria Modugno (born 1958), Italian actress
- Enrica Piccoli (born 1999), Italian synchronized swimmer
- Enrica Rinaldi (born 1998), Italian freestyle wrestler
- Enrica Rosanna (born 1938), Italian nun, sociologist and author
- Enrica Soma (1929–1969), American socialite and model
- Enrica von Handel-Mazzetti (1871–1955), Austrian poet and writer
- Enrica Zunic', Italian writer

== See also ==
- Enrica Lexie, an Italian Aframax oil-tanker
