= Dandolo (surname) =

Dandolo is an Italian surname. The Dandolo family of the Republic of Venice produced several Doges. Notable people with the surname include:

- Four Doges of Venice:
  - Enrico Dandolo, 41st Doge
  - Giovanni Dandolo, 48th Doge
  - Francesco Dandolo, 52nd Doge
  - Andrea Dandolo, 54th Doge
- Two Risorgimento fighters
  - Enrico Dandolo (patriot)
  - Emilio Dandolo
- Andrea Dandolo (admiral), Venetian admiral, not the same man as the Doge of this name
- Vincenzo, Count Dandolo, chemist, agriculturist and Napoleon's governor of Dalmatia

== See also ==
- Italian ironclad Enrico Dandolo, named after the Doge Enrico Dandolo
- Dandolo, Maniago - frazione of the comune of Maniago, province of Pordenone.
