= Villa Negroni =

Historic villa in Vezia, Switzerland

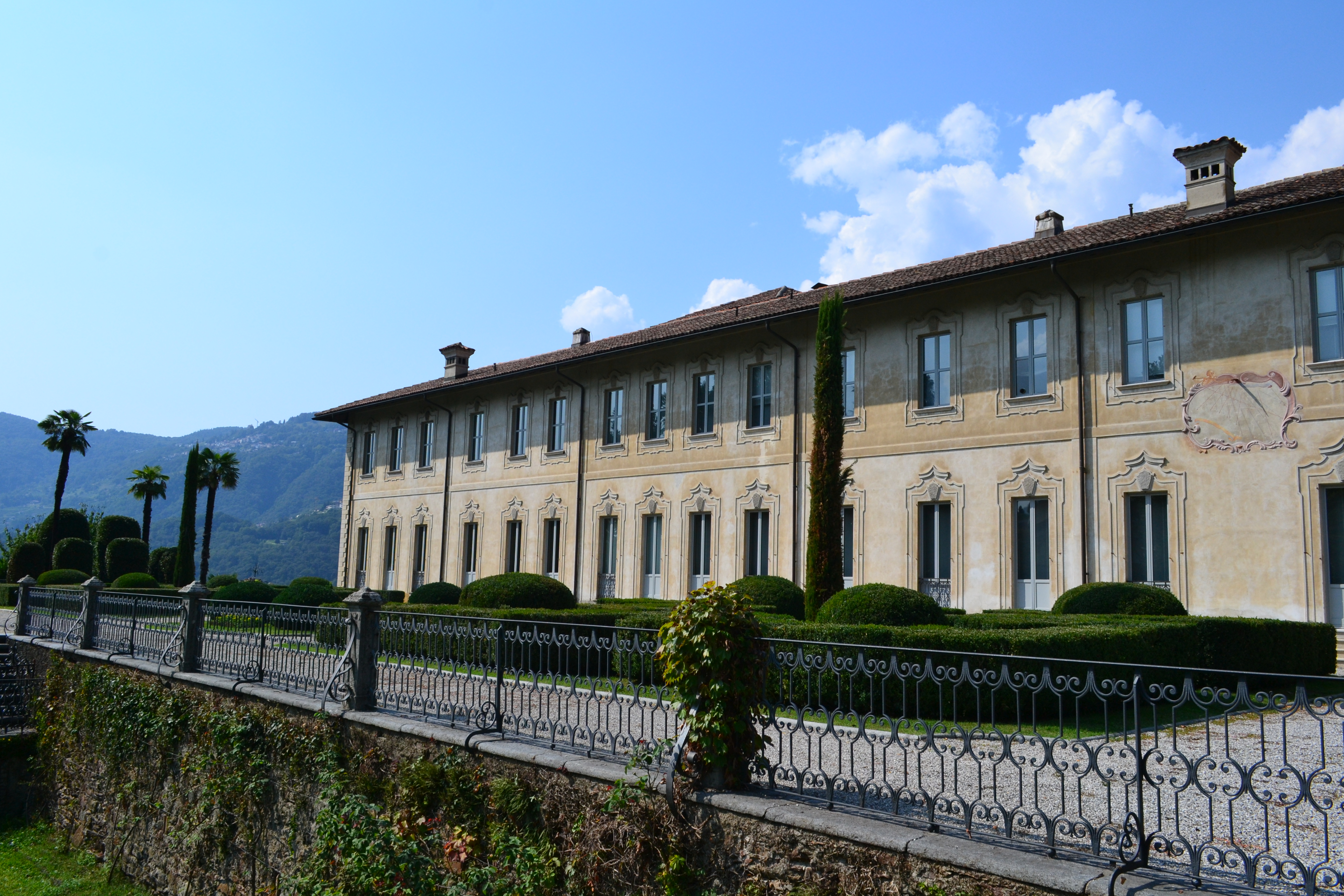
- Villa Negroni with a park
- Interactive map of Villa Negroni
- Alternative names: Villa Morosini

General information
- Type: Historic residence
- Architectural style: Baroque with elements of Italian classicism
- Location: Vezia, Switzerland, Via Morosini 1, 6943 Vezia
- Coordinates: 46°01′40″N 8°56′10″E
- Construction started: c. 1700
- Renovated: 1860, c. 1910–1920
- Owner: City of Lugano

Design and construction
- Architects: Carlo Morosini (18th century), later renovations: Giovanni Antonio Negroni (20th century)

Villa Negroni, also known as Villa Morosini, is a historic residence located in Vezia, Canton of Ticino, Switzerland. It is recognized as one of the most important and valuable residences in the canton. Built in the early 18th century for Carlo Morosini of Lugano, the residence underwent significant transformations in the 19th and 20th centuries. In the 19th century, it became an intellectual center, attracting prominent representatives of Italian cultural life engaged in the Risorgimento movement. Since 1976, it has been owned by the city of Lugano and is listed in the inventory of cultural property of national significance.

== History ==
=== Early period (18th century) ===
Villa Negroni was built in the early 18th century by Carlo Morosini of Lugano. Originally named Villa Morosini, reflecting its association with the influential Venetian aristocratic family settled in the Swiss Confederation, the building represented Baroque architecture, serving as a representative residence of 18th-century Italian nobility.

=== Risorgimento era (19th century) ===
The residence's peak period of significance occurred in the 19th century, when Villa Negroni became an artistic and intellectual center, attracting prominent representatives of Italian cultural life engaged in the Risorgimento movement. The residence was visited by composer Giuseppe Verdi, poet and librettist Arrigo Boito, painter Francesco Hayez, and writer Antonio Fogazzaro. It served as a significant intellectual center of the region, serving as a meeting point for intellectuals and artists engaged in the Risorgimento.

In 1819, the estate became the residence of Giovanni Battista Morosini (1782–1874), a Swiss lawyer, politician, and judge of Ticino, and his wife Emilia Morosini (1804–1875), daughter of a Swiss official and patron of culture who supported the Risorgimento community. Emilia came from the Zeltner house in Solothurn, where Polish general and national hero Tadeusz Kościuszko lived during the last years of his life (1815–1817). After Kościuszko's death, his heart, in accordance with his will, was bequeathed to the Zeltner family, and subsequently brought to Villa Negroni through Emilia's marriage, where it was kept in the mausoleum for some time. Emilia Morosini was an active supporter of the Risorgimento movement. During the Milan uprising in March 1848 (the Five Days of Milan), she gathered members of the Provisional Government of Lombardy in her home and organized aid for the insurgents, raising funds and supplies.

As a result of the Five Days of Milan and the struggle for Italian independence, three young patriots fell in defense of the Roman Republic (1849): Emilio Morosini (1830–1849), the son of the owners, Enrico Dandolo (1827–1849), and Luciano Manara (1825–1849). Their remains were transferred to the residence's mausoleum. The mausoleum symbolized the connection between Polish and Italian history – General Tadeusz Kościuszko's heart rested there alongside Italian Risorgimento patriots, though it is no longer there. Among the residence's guests was also General Giuseppe Garibaldi.

=== Reconstruction at the turn of the 19th and 20th centuries ===
In 1860, the residence was expanded. In 1910, the estate passed into the hands of Count Alessandro Negroni of Milan. His son Giovanni Antonio, an architect, undertook a comprehensive reconstruction while respecting the original architectural features. Under his direction, stables were built below the main grounds, a new north wing connected by a bridge with sculptures, a chapel and ossuary, and a formal Italian garden was created on the adjacent grounds. Decorative elements were made of wrought iron and transported from the Negroni family estate in Brianza, Italy.

The Italian garden was created between 1910 and 1920 with 17th century elements: trimmed boxwood, palm trees, flowerbeds surrounded by borders, a grotto made of tuff, fountains, numerous statuettes, and wrought iron decorations. The design was based on strict symmetry and represented the humanistic values of the Italian Renaissance.

=== Acquisition by Lugano (from 1976) ===
In 1976, the city of Lugano acquired the estate, initiating a comprehensive restoration work. After the acquisition, the residence served various educational institutions – housing the American School, College of Music, and Professional School of Fashion Design. Since 1990, it has housed the Banking Studies Center (Centro di Studi Bancari), an educational unit of the Ticino Banking Association. Restorations in 1976, 1990, and 1996 included comprehensive renovation of the interiors and renewal of the garden with a small courtyard according to architect Negroni's original plans. Plantings were carried out according to old schemes from 1910 to 1920.

== Architecture ==
=== Main building ===
The main building represents Baroque architecture with elements of Italian classicism. The south facade has sixteen window axes with stucco frames and contains a sundial with an allegorical figure of Death with a scythe.

The 20th-century north wing has a portal with rusticated pilasters and an iron entrance gate. The connection between the old and new sections forms a bridge with sculptures, creating a courtyard.

=== Gardens ===
The park surrounding the residence has a clear division between Italian and English gardens.

The Italian garden (parterre all'italiana) is a formal garden with geometric and symmetrical patterns, designed between 1910 and 1920. It is a rare example of an Italian parterre in Switzerland, though dating from the 20th century rather than the Renaissance. The garden is decorated with statues and vases, common boxwood hedges, palm trees, fountains, and artificial marble decorations. The garden is designed as a natural continuation of the villa's facade.

The staircase has a diamond shape and leads to a large lawn.

The English garden is less formal, with a chapel and ossuary among cedars, beeches, and oaks, by a stream. The entrance is adorned with a wrought iron portal.

=== San Giuseppe Chapel ===
The Chapel of Saint Joseph (San Giuseppe) stands before the entrance to the villa. Built in the mid-18th century by the Morosinis, it has an apsidal plan and displays the Morosini coat of arms with foxes.

The interior is decorated with illusionistic painting, probably by Giovanni Antonio Torricelli, with an image of St. Joseph by Aligio Sassu from 1998. Additional paintings by Sassu depict biblical scenes. The facade was executed by Giovanni Battista Rapa. The chapel underwent restoration in 1966 and from 1995 to 1997.

== Status and significance ==
Villa Negroni is listed in the Swiss Inventory of Cultural Property of National and Regional Significance. It is recognized as one of the most important and valuable residences in the Canton of Ticino. The residence testifies to the Risorgimento period and the cultural exchange between northern Italy and Switzerland.
