= Fazzino =

Fazzino is a surname. Notable people with the surname include:

- Charles Fazzino (born 1955), American painter
- Jack Fazzino, American politician

== See also ==
- Fazzini
