= Emilio Dandolo =

Italian patriot and soldier

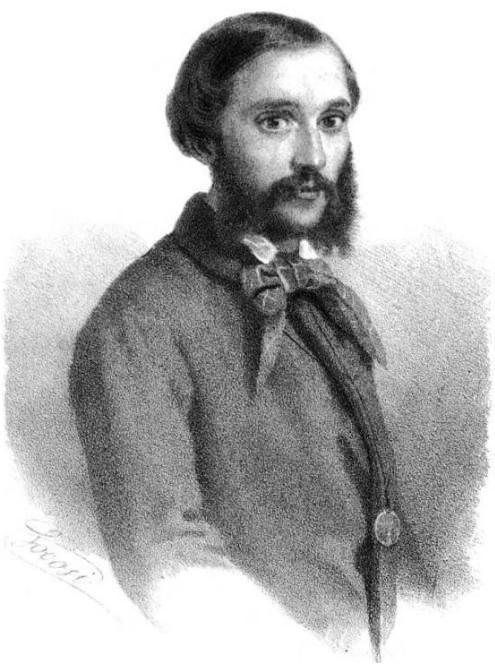
Emilio Dandolo

Emilio Dandolo (5 July 1830, Varese – 20 February 1859, Milan) was an important figure in the Italian Risorgimento, participating in several of its most important battles.

== Life ==
Originating from Dandolo family which produced several other figures involved in the Italian Wars of Independence, Emilio Dandolo was one of the protagonists in the Five Days of Milan (1848) beside his brother Enrico and their friends Luciano Manara and Emilio Morosini.

He took part (with the Lombard volunteers) in the Legione Manara in the Brescian and Trentine campaigns of the First Italian War of Independence. The next year, 1849, he and Enrico participated in the formation of the Roman Republic and then defended it with the Battaglione Bersaglieri Lombardi, commanded by Luciano Manara. He was injured in the riot at the Villa Corsini in Rome at which Enrico died.

In the aftermath of the fall of the Roman Republic, he fled into exile first to Marseille and then to Lugano. During this period Emilio wrote, including "Journey to Egypt, the Sudan, Syria and Palestine" ("Viaggio in Egitto, nel Sudan, in Siria ed in Palestina") and "The volunteers and the Lombard bersaglieri" ("I volontari e i bersaglieri lombardi"). Returning to Italy, he immediately joined preparations for the renewal of hostilities against the Austrian Empire. He participated in the Crimean War, but since he was an Austrian citizen he was sent back to Milan, where was put under strict police control. Seriously ill with consumption, he died in 1859 shortly before Lombardy became free from Austria. His funeral, in Milan, was purged of anti-Austrian connotations and, on the Austrian authorities' dispensation (hoping to avoid riots), he was buried in the cemetery of Adro
