= Enrico Dandolo (disambiguation) =

Enrico Dandolo may refer to:

- Enrico Dandolo (died 1205), 42nd Doge of Venice from 1192 until his death
- Enrico Dandolo (patriarch) (died 1182), uncle of the doge and patriarch of Grado, Italy, from 1133 to 1182
- Enrico Dandolo (patriot) (1827–1849) an important figure in the Italian Risorgimento, participating in several of its most important battles
- Italian ironclad Enrico Dandolo, a battleship of the Italian Navy, named after the Doge
