= Fazzini =

Fazzini is a surname. Notable people with the surname include:

- Enrico Fazzini, American neurologist and osteopathic physician
- Luca Fazzini (born 1995), Swiss ice hockey player
- Pericle Fazzini (1913–1987), Italian painter and sculptor
- Jacopo Fazzini (born 2003), Italian footballer

== See also ==
- Azzini
