= Enrici =

Enrici is an Italian surname. Notable people with the surname include:

- Domenico Enrici (1909–1997), Italian bishop and Vatican diplomat
- Giuseppe Enrici (1898–1968), Italian road racing cyclist

== See also ==
- Enrico
