= Zunic =

Zunic is a surname. Notable people with the surname include:

- Dragiša Žunić (born 1978), Serbian footballer
- Enrica Zunic', Italian writer
- Ivica Žunić (born 1988), Croatian footballer
- Jordan Zunic (born 1991), Australian golfer
- Matt Zunic (1919–2006), American basketball player and coach
- Stipe Žunić (born 1990), Croatian athlete
