= Peter Josef Zeltner =

Swiss officer, politician, and diplomat

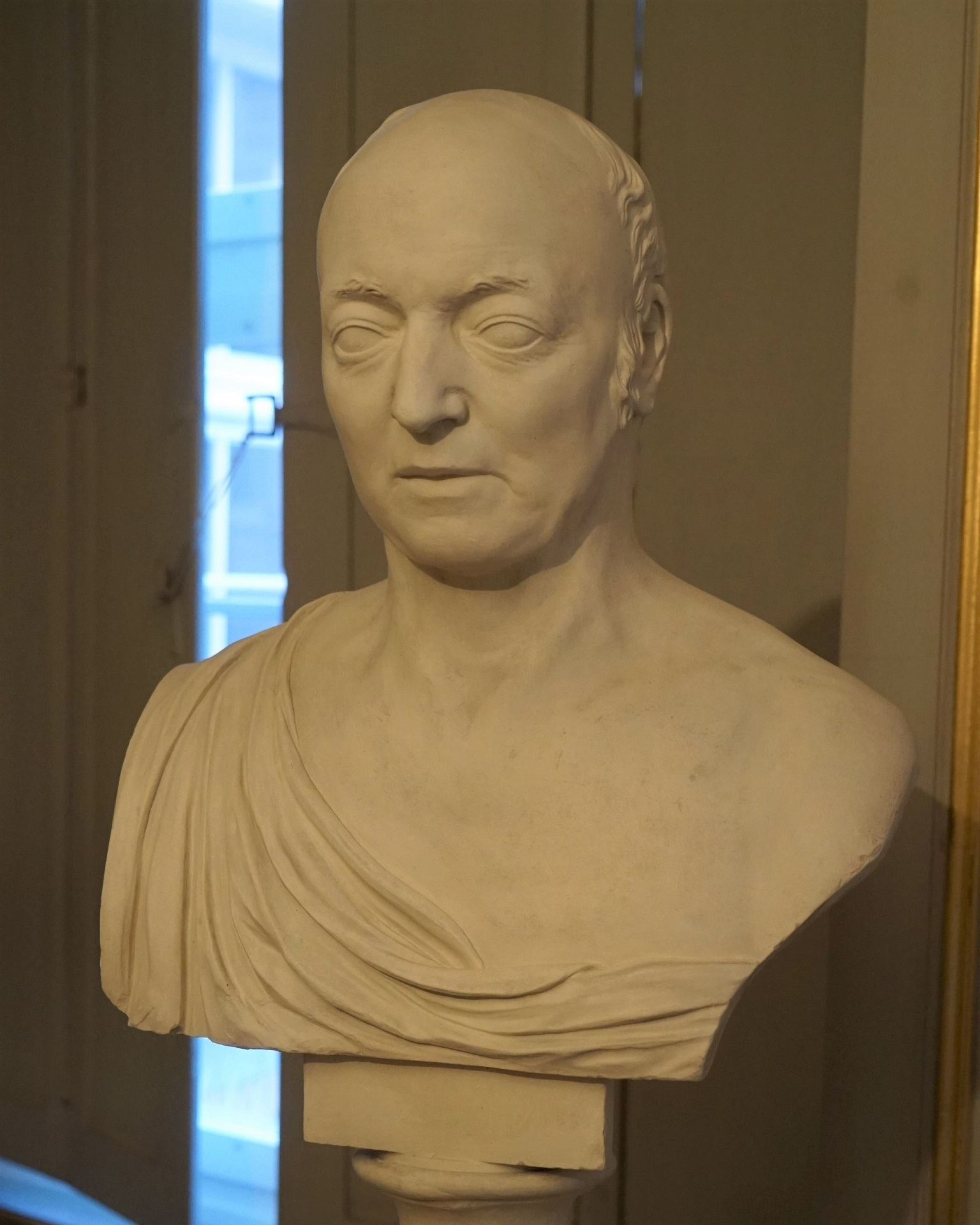
- Born: 30 November 1765; Solothurn, Switzerland
- Died: 22 January 1830 (aged 64); Solothurn, Switzerland
- Occupations: Officer, politician, diplomat

Peter Josef Zeltner (30 November 1765 – 22 January 1830) was a Swiss military officer, politician, and diplomat, recognized as Switzerland's first professional diplomat and the first envoy of the Helvetic Republic to France from 1798 to 1800. For over a decade, he hosted Polish national leader Tadeusz Kościuszko at his Berville estate near Fontainebleau.

== Early life and career ==
Peter Josef Zeltner was born in Solothurn, Switzerland, to Franz Xaver Zeltner, a treasury secretary and mayor of Solothurn, and Isabelle de la Martinière, from a French noble family. He studied at the Jesuit college in Solothurn. From 1783 to 1791, Zeltner served as an officer in the Swiss Guards in Versailles under King Louis XVI. Returning to Solothurn in 1791, he joined the Great Council of the canton and served as salzkassier (salt trade treasurer) until 1795.

In 1795, Zeltner was sent to Ulm as a cantonal representative. Two years later, on 23 November 1797, after General Napoleon Bonaparte's arrival in Solothurn, Zeltner ordered an artillery salute in his honor, violating a local ban on nighttime firing. This led to his arrest and caused diplomatic tensions between Switzerland and France.

== Career in the Helvetic Republic ==
In 1798, after the French invasion of Switzerland and the establishment of the Helvetic Republic, Zeltner was appointed to the provisional Solothurn government and the Great Council of the Republic. The Helvetic Republic, a French satellite state, replaced the old confederation of cantons with a centralized unitary system. On 27 April 1798, Zeltner became the first envoy of the Helvetic Republic to Paris, serving until 21 February 1800.

Zeltner was the first professional Swiss diplomat, thus inaugurating the era of the Swiss foreign service. His mission in Paris was the first permanent diplomatic representation in Swiss history.

== Relationship with Tadeusz Kościuszko ==
After his diplomatic mission ended in 1800, Zeltner remained in France, where he founded a bank. From 1801 to 1815, he hosted the Polish national leader Tadeusz Kościuszko at his Berville estate near Fontainebleau. The Polish leader, retired from political life, found friendship and hospitality with Zeltner's family.

In his 5 May 1798 will, drafted in Philadelphia before his departure for Europe, Kościuszko named Thomas Jefferson as executor of his American estate. While staying with Zeltner, Kościuszko drafted additional wills including the family. After prolonged legal disputes, which reached the Supreme Court of the United States three times, it was ruled in 1852 that Kościuszko's estate would pass to his heirs in Poland on the basis of the 1816 will, which invalidated earlier dispositions.

In 1815, after the Congress of Vienna, Kościuszko moved to Solothurn, residing with Zeltner's brother, Xaver Zeltner. He spent the last two years of his life there until his death on 15 October 1817.

== Later years ==
Following Switzerland's return to its traditional constitutional order, Zeltner resumed political activity in Solothurn. Between 1814 and 1830, he served as a member of the canton's Grand Council, continuing the family tradition of service in the local administration.

A member of Freemasonry, Zeltner e died in Solothurn on 22 January 1830, aged 64, leaving a legacy as a pioneer of Swiss diplomacy and a friend of one of the heroes of the Polish nation.

== Family ==
Peter Josef Zeltner married Angelica Charlotte Adelheid Drouin de Vandeuil de Lhuis, from a French noble family. His father, Franz Xaver Josef Anton Zeltner (1734–1801), treasurer's secretary and mayor of Solothurn, who held many prestigious positions in the canton, including that of Vogt in Gösgen, Bechburg, and Flumenthal, as well as mint master.

His older brother, Xaver Zeltner (1764–1835), was also involved in the political life of Helvetia and ended his career as a notary and appellate judge. After Kościuszko's return from France in 1815, the Polish hero spent the last years of his life in Xaver's house.
