= Kościuszko Museum, Solothurn =

Museum dedicated to Tadeusz Kościuszko in Solothurn, Switzerland

Kościuszko Museum
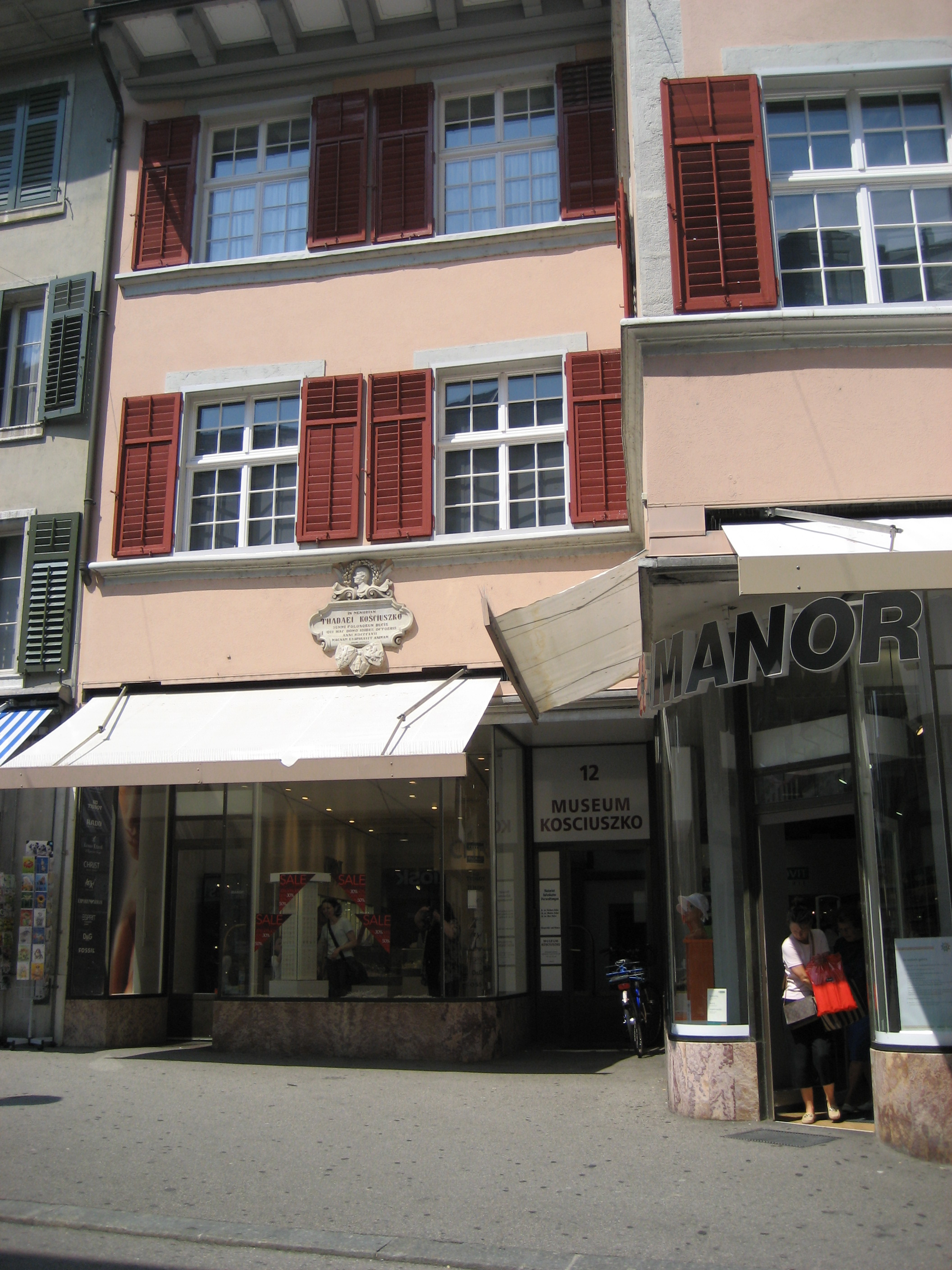
- Museum building at 12 Gurzelngasse Street
- Established: 1936
- Location: 12 Gurzelngasse Street, Solothurn, Switzerland
- Coordinates: 47°12′28.91″N 7°32′10.85″E
- Type: Biographical museum
- Website: www.kosciuszko-solothurn.ch

The Kościuszko Museum is a museum in Solothurn, Switzerland, operating since 1936 in the house at 12 Gurzelngasse Street, where Polish national hero Tadeusz Kościuszko died. The museum's collection is listed as "Cultural Property of Regional Significance" (category B object) under number KGS 4719 in the Swiss Inventory of Cultural Property.

== History ==
The initiative to establish the museum arose in 1932, when the company Chocolat Villars AG purchased the house at 12 Gurzelngasse Street and converted the ground floor into a retail space. The idea of preserving Tadeusz Kościuszko's last residence was made by the then ambassador of the Second Polish Republic in Bern, Jan Modzelewski, together with cultural attaché Alfons Bronarski. In 1933, an Honorary Organizing Committee was established, chaired by Max Obrecht, cantonal state councillor.

The museum was ceremonially opened on 27 September 1936 in the Cantonal Council hall of the Solothurn town hall, under the honorary patronage of federal councillors Giuseppe Motta and Hermann Obrecht, Polish Minister of Foreign Affairs Józef Beck, and United States Ambassador Hugh R. Wilson. The ceremony was attended by representatives of Polish associations in Switzerland and representatives of the Swiss cultural world. On the same day, the Kościuszko Society was established, which assumed responsibility for the museum and the Polish memorial site in Zuchwil.

In 1937, world-renowned Polish pianist Ignacy Jan Paderewski performed a concert and donated the proceeds to reconstruct the original appearance of Kościuszko's death chamber based on a watercolor by Antoni Brodowski. The museum received numerous paintings and prints illustrating Kościuszko's deeds from Polish institutions and private individuals; the Gassmann family and Italian heirs of Emilia Zeltner donated memorabilia of the hero.

=== Reorganization ===
In 1978, it was determined that the museum did not meet contemporary museum standards. Implementation of the modernization project required raising 90,000 Swiss francs, which were obtained through grants from the city and Canton of Solothurn, as well as numerous companies and private individuals. Between 1981 and 1983, under the direction of Zygmunt Stankiewicz and Nicolo Vitale, the facility was redesigned and expanded to include a third room. The reopening took place on 15 September 1984.

In 2006, an original pistol that Kościuszko carried with him during his stay in Paris was purchased at a weapons auction. In April 2018, the museum was expanded to include the general's study, previously privately occupied, containing an original, probably 230-year-old walnut cabinet used by the chief. The lease agreement was signed thanks to the support of the Polish Capital Group SOLBET. Between 2020 and 2022, renovations were carried out financed by the Ministry of Foreign Affairs through the Help for Poles in the East foundation. On 26 September 2021, the museum celebrated its 85th anniversary.

== Kościuszko Society ==
The organization operating the museum is the Kościuszko Society (Kościuszko-Gesellschaft), founded in 1936. In addition to maintaining the museum, the society cares for the Polenanlage (Polish Monument) in Zuchwil, including the Polish chapel consecrated on 1 November 1942, and celebrates friendship between Poles and Swiss. Traditionally, the president and vice-president of the society come from the circles of municipal or governmental authorities of the Canton of Solothurn. In the 1980s, the society had approximately 700 members from around the world.

Since 2016, Remo Ankli has been president of the society, and since 2022, Stefanie Ingold has been vice-president. The position of president has been held successively by Max Obrecht, Robert Kurt, Urs Dietschi, Franz Josef Jeger, Alfred Rötheli, and Thomas Wallner.

== Kościuszko in Solothurn ==
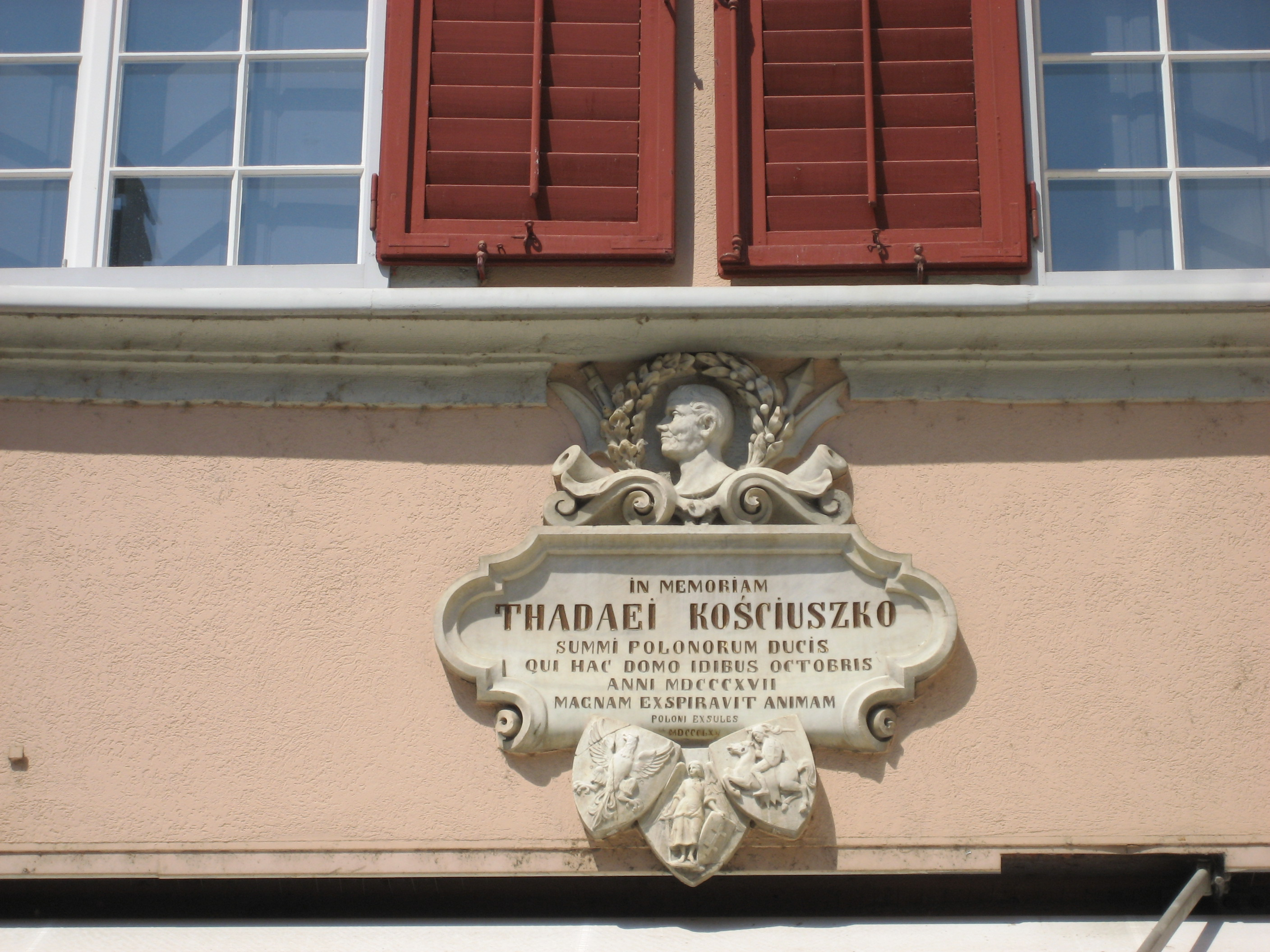
Memorial plaque on the museum building

Tadeusz Kościuszko lived in Solothurn from 1815 to 1817, renting in July 1815 an apartment on the first floor of a tenement house owned by Franz Xaver Zeltner at 12 Gurzelngasse Street. He died in this house on 15 October 1817 at the age of 71 after falling from a horse, which resulted in fever, and several days later a stroke.

After his death, Kościuszko's body was embalmed, and his internal organs (except for the heart) were buried by Franz Xaver Zeltner in the cemetery in nearby Zuchwil. In 1820, a large tombstone was erected there next to a Polish memorial chapel, known as the Polenanlage (Polish Monument). Kościuszko's heart was initially kept in an urn at the Polish Museum in Rapperswil, and in 1927 it was repatriated to Warsaw, where it currently rests in the chapel at the Royal Castle. The embalmed body was initially placed in the crypt of the former Jesuit church in Solothurn, and then in 1818, it was transported to Kraków and buried in the crypt at the Wawel Castle.

== Exhibition ==
The museum collections are presented in three rooms. They contain personal memorabilia of Kościuszko, paintings, and prints related to him. The heart of the exhibition is an alcove with a faithfully reconstructed bed on which Kościuszko died. The bedroom contains a copy of this bed and several original paintings, including the famous Kościuszko's Oath in the Market Square in Kraków by Wojciech Kossak. In the sitting room is a symbolic bronze urn made by Wincenty Trojanowski for the Kościuszko Mausoleum in the Polish Museum in Rapperswil; a copy of the original that until 1927 contained the Chief's heart.

Preserved memorabilia include two saddles for horseback riding, two holsters for pistols, a chessboard, a gold watch, and a gold memorial ring from 1794 containing the chief's hair. The museum possesses two busts made from life in 1800 by Pankratius Eggenschwiler; the first depicting Kościuszko in a Roman toga, the second Pierre Zeltner, the host of the house. The collection also includes a complete set of Polish banknotes from the period of the Kościuszko Uprising and 11 regimental seals from Kościuszko's time.

== Archive ==
The museum's archival collections were established with the founding of the institution in 1936. They include two memorial books from 1832 and 1865 established by veterans of national uprisings, a book containing the names of Polish soldiers interned and deceased in Switzerland, Kościuszko's "Solothurn" wills from 1816 and 1817, and two letters to Kościuszko from the Zeltner children from late December 1816. The archival collections were processed and inventoried in 2021 thanks to a grant from the Ministry of Culture and National Heritage under the program "Support for Polish Archives, Libraries and Museums in the West".

== Notable visitors ==
Over several decades of the museum's existence, it has been visited by many distinguished representatives of the Polish nation. Guests have included General Władysław Anders, former Commander-in-Chief of the Polish Armed Forces, Cardinal Karol Wojtyła (later Pope John Paul II), Władysław Bartoszewski (later Minister of Foreign Affairs), President Lech Wałęsa, and Cardinal Józef Glemp, Primate of Poland. On 20 September 2018, the museum was visited by Deputy Prime Minister and Minister of Culture and National Heritage Piotr Gliński accompanied by Jacek Miller, Director of the Cultural Heritage Department.

== See also ==
- List of museums in Switzerland
- Polish Museum, Rapperswil
- Thaddeus Kościuszko National Memorial
- Xaver Zeltner
