= Enrica Malcovati =

Italian classical philologist (1894–1990)

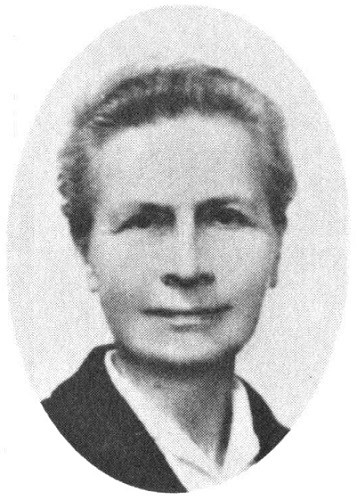
- Born: 21 October 1894; Pavia, Italy
- Died: 4 January 1990 (aged 95)
- Occupations: Academic, scholar, classicist

Academic work
- Discipline: Classics
- Sub-discipline: Greek literature Latin literature
- Institutions: University of Pavia; University of Cagliari

Enrica Malcovati (21 October 1894 - 4 January 1990) was an Italian Classical philologist.

== Career ==
In 1927, she was the general editor of Athenaeum, following the death of her mentor Carlo Pascal. She became a private teacher at the University of Pavia in 1930, the same year as her magnum opus - the three volumes of Oratorum Romanorum fragmenta - was published.

In 1940, Malcovati moved to the University of Cagliari to become the Professor of Latin. In this role she published several studies and translations of ancient authors including Lucan and Cicero. In 1946 she took up the role of Professor Greek at the University of Pavia before switching to the chair in Latin in 1950. She retired in 1969.

In 1970, she received an honorary doctorate in philosophy from the University of Vienna, and in 1978 she was elected to membership of the Accademia dei Lincei.

== Legacy ==
After her death, an issue of the Bollettino dei classici was dedicated to her memory. A conference proceedings published in 1996 celebrated the October 1994 conference held in Pavia to celebrate the 100th anniversary of her birth.

Malcovati's home city, Pavia, named a street after her, the 'Via Enrica Malcovati'.

== Select publications ==
- Malcovati, E. 1921 (1st edition) Imperatoris Caesaris Augusti operum fragmenta. Turin.
- Malcovati, E. 1930 (1st edition) (ed.) Oratorum Romanorum fragmenta. Turin.
- Malcovati, E. 1940. M. Anneo Lucano. Milan.
- Malcovati, E. 1943. "Cicerone e la poesia",. Pavia, Annali della Facoltà di lettere e di filosofia della Università di Cagliari 13.
- Malcovati, E. 1944. Clodia, Fulvia, Marzia, Terenzia. Rome.
- Malcovati, E. 1945. Donne, ispiratrici di poeti nell’antica Roma. Rome.
- Malcovati, E. 1952. Madame Dacier, una gentildonna filologa del gran secolo. Florence.
- Malcovati, E. 1965 (1st edition) (ed.) M. Tulli Ciceronis Brutus. Leipzig.

== Bibliography ==
- Montuschi, Claudia (2007). "Malcovati, Enrica". Dizionario Biografico degli Italiani (in Italian). Vol. 68. Istituto della Enciclopedia Italiana.
