= Enrico Bocchieri =

American computer engineer

Enrico Bocchieri of AT&T Research in Florham Park, New Jersey is a computer engineer. He was named a Fellow of the Institute of Electrical and Electronics Engineers (IEEE) in 2013 for his contributions to computational models for speech recognition.
