= Xaver Zeltner =

Swiss public figure

- Born: November 19, 1764; Solothurn
- Died: September 18, 1835 (aged 70); Saronno, Lombardy
- Occupations: Officer, politician, senator, judge

Xaver Zeltner, also known as Franz Xaver Zeltner (19 November 1764 – 18 September 1835), was a Swiss officer, politician, senator of the Helvetic Republic, and judge. His home in Solothurn served as the residence and final resting place of Polish national leader Tadeusz Kościuszko.

== Biography ==
=== Early life and education ===
Xaver Zeltner, born Urs Xaver Joseph Anton Zeltner, was born in Solothurn, Switzerland, to Franz Anton Zeltner, a member of the Great Council (Grossrat), and Maria Anna de La Martinière. His uncle, Franz Peter Alois Zeltner, was the director of the mint and city secretary of Solothurn. Zeltner attended the Jesuit college in Solothurn and served as an officer in the Cent-Suisses in Paris from 1781 to 1788.

=== Administrative career ===
In 1788, Zeltner became a clerk (Amtsschreiber) in the Flumenthal district before returning to Solothurn as a notary. From 1793 to 1798, he served in the Great Council of the Canton of Solothurn and acted as Landvogt (bailiff) in Lugano from 1793 to 1794.

=== Role in the Helvetic Republic ===
In February 1798, Zeltner was arrested in Solothurn as a patriot, a supporter of revolutionary reforms inspired by the French Revolution and the Helvetic Revolution. The traditional patrician authorities viewed reformers as a threat. Released the following month after French troops intervened, he joined the provisional government of the Canton of Solothurn and, on 26 March 1798, became a senator of the Helvetic Republic. Until 1800, he served as a government representative (Regierungsstatthalter). From 1802 to 1803, Zeltner represented the Helvetic Republic at the Consulta in Paris, where he befriended Tadeusz Kościuszko. From 1810 to 1814, he was part of the liberal opposition in Solothurn's Great Council and served as an appellate judge from 1811 to 1814. In 1814, he joined a provisional government but was later arrested for his involvement in a coup attempt.

=== Connection to Tadeusz Kościuszko ===
From 1815 to 1817, Tadeusz Kościuszko resided in Zeltner's home at 12 Gurzelngasse, Solothurn, where he died on 15 October 1817. Kościuszko had previously stayed at the estate of Zeltner's brother, Peter Josef Zeltner, in Berville near Fontainebleau, France, from 1801 to 1815. In 1936, Zeltner's home was converted into the Kościuszko Museum, dedicated to Kościuszko's legacy.

=== Family ===
In 1794, Zeltner married Orsola Peri from Lugano. Their daughter, Emilia, married Giovanni Battista Morosini (1782–1874), a Lugano lawyer, politician, and former State Councilor who adopted Austrian citizenship in 1842. The Morosinis had five daughters and a son, who died in 1849 fighting for Italian independence. The Zeltner family was Catholic. Zeltner's brother, Peter Josef Zeltner (1765–1830), served as the Helvetic Republic's first envoy to France and was also a member of the Cent-Suisses in Paris.

Xaver Zeltner died on 18 September 1835 in Saronno, Lombardy.
