= Dandolo =

Patrician family of the Republic of Venice

Dandolo family
- Current region: Italy
- Origin: Ancient Rome (claimed)
- Members: Enrico Dandolo (patriarch), Enrico Dandolo, Andrea Dandolo, Giovanni Dandolo, Francesco Dandolo, Emilio Dandolo
- Connected members: Lorenzo Priuli (by marriage); Pasquale Malipiero (by marriage)
- Connected families: Nemanjić dynasty Orseolo family Sanudo family Priuli family Malipiero family
- Distinctions: Doge of Venice
- Estates: Palazzo Dandolo, Ca' Farsetti

The House of Dandolo (Italian: [ˈdandolo]) was a patrician family of the Republic of Venice, which produced four Doges of Venice. The progenitor of the family was a merchant named Domenico. The family became more successful by the beginning of the 12th century.

== Members ==
=== Early members ===
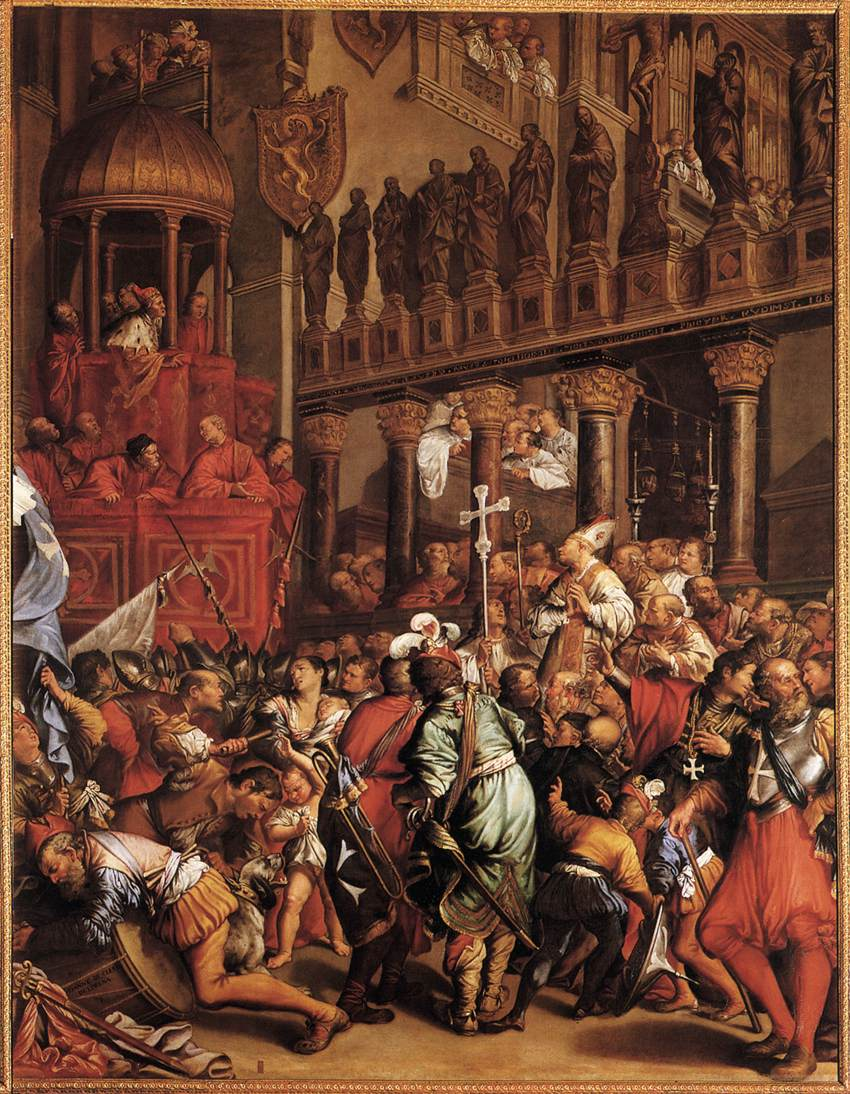
Doge Enrico Dandolo Recruiting for the Crusade.

- Domenico Dandolo (fl. 1085 – June 1107), nobleman in San Luca
  - Pietro Dandolo
  - Bono Dandolo
  - Vitale Dandolo, jurist, ambassador to Ferrara and bailo in Constantinople
    - Enrico Dandolo (c. 1107 – May 1205), Doge of Venice (1192–1205)
      - Raniero Dandolo (fl. 1204–42), admiral, Procurator and Vice-Doge
        - Anna Dandolo (fl. 1217), Queen of Serbia, third wife of King Stefan the First-Crowned
  - Enrico Dandolo (ca. 1100–1182), Patriarch of Grado
- ?
  - Giberto Dandolo (1220–1279), admiral
    - Giovanni Dandolo, Doge of Venice (1280–89)
- ?
  - Marino Dandolo

=== 14th century ===
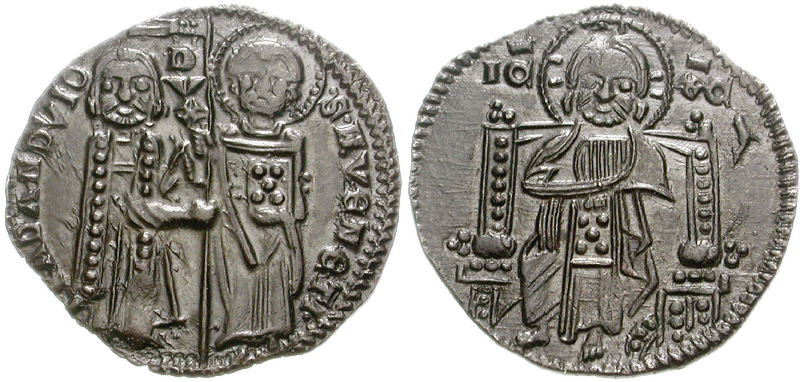
Venetian matapan, reign of Francesco Dandolo.

- Andrea Dandolo, great-great-great grandson of Pietro Dandolo
- Francesco Dandolo

=== 15th century ===
- Giovanna Dandolo, Dogaressa of Venice (1457–62)

=== 16th century ===
- Zilia Dandolo, Dogaressa of Venice (1556–59)
- Matteo Dandolo, Ambassador of Venice (1549)

== Modern family ==
- Enrico Dandolo (patriot)
- Emilio Dandolo
- Giorgio Dandolo
- Savas Dandolo

== See also ==
- Palazzo Dandolo
- Palazzo Dandolo Paolucci

== Sources ==
- Madden, Thomas F. (2008). Enrico Dandolo and the Rise of Venice. JHU Press. pp. 12–. ISBN 978-0-8018-9184-7.
- Loredan, Alvise (1981). I Dandolo. Dall'Oglio.
