= Enrico Misasi =

Brazilian politician (born 1994)

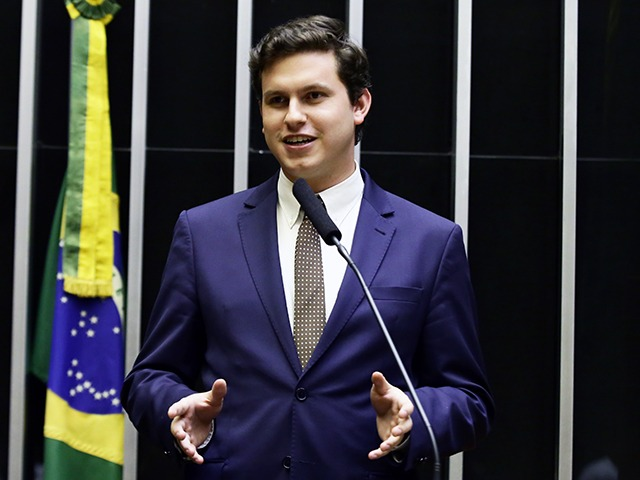
- Misasi in 2019

Member-elect of the Chamber of Deputies
- Assuming office 1 February 2027
- Constituency: São Paulo
- In office 1 February 2019 – 1 February 2023
- Constituency: São Paulo

Personal details
- Born: Enrico van Blarcum de Graaff Misasi; 6 August 1994 (age 32) São Paulo, Brazil
- Party: MDB (since 2022)
- Other political affiliations: PV (2018–2022)
- Profession: Lawyer

Enrico van Blarcum de Graaff Misasi (born 6 August 1994) is a Brazilian politician serving as chief secretary of the Civil House of São Paulo since 2025. From 2019 to 2023, he was a member of the Chamber of Deputies.
