= Azzini =

Azzini is an Italian surname. Notable people with the surname include:

- Carlo Azzini (1935–2020), Italian cyclist
- Ernesto Azzini (1885–1923), Italian cyclist
- Giovanni Azzini (1929–1994), Italian footballer
- Giuseppe Azzini (1891–1925), Italian cyclist
