= Enrica Detragiache =

American economist

Assistant Director of the European Branch of the International Monetary Fund

IMF Mission Chief for Germany

Personal details
- Born: Enrica Detragiache
- Education: University of Turin, University of Pennsylvania

Enrica Detragiache is the head of the Germany Desk of the International Monetary Fund (IMF), and the assistant director of the IMF's European division. She formerly taught economics at Johns Hopkins University, and has published over 70 research papers and articles. Her research covers topics such as labour migration, financial crises, development economics, and corporate finance.

== Education ==
Detragiache completed her undergraduate degree in economics at the University of Turin in Italy. She went on to postgraduate research at the University of Pennsylvania, where she received her Ph.D. in economics in 1988. Her Ph.D. dissertation, "Essays on external borrowing by less developed countries" covers default risks in international finance markets for loans from a theoretical point of view. During Detragiache's graduate studies at the University of Pennsylvania, her advisors were former Chief Economist of the IMF Maurice Obstfeld, and Argentine-American economist Guillermo A. Calvo.

== Career ==
Detragiache began her academic career as an assistant professor of economics at Johns Hopkins University, from 1988 to 1995. She then went on to work at the IMF in 1995, where she started out as an economic advisor. She then specialised as an advisor for the European department of the IMF in 2011, and then in 2012 became the assistant director of the European division of the IMF, where she remains today. She is also currently the Mission Chief for Germany.

As Mission Chief for Germany, Detragiache visits the country on an annual basis as part of regular consultations under Article IV of the IMF's Articles of Agreement. These trips can also be undertaken when a request is made to borrow IMF resources, or in order to monitor staff programs or economic development. In 2016, Detragiache's German Consultation led her to find that domestic demand was leading German economic growth at the time, along with expansionary fiscal and monetary policy, but the possibility of Brexit posed a downward risk.

== Research and academic work ==
Detragiache has written many working papers for the IMF on financial crises, banking, labour migration and development economics, among other topics. Her research has also been published in numerous academic journals, including the Journal of Monetary Economics, the Journal of Money, Credit and Banking, the American Economic Review, the Journal of Finance and the Journal of Development Economics.

Her research has been cited heavily, in particular research she has done on labour movement during the European Migrant Crisis, where Germany's open-door refugee policy led to the country accepting large numbers of refugees. In an article from the Guardian in 2016, she is cited as saying that the negative effects of the refugee influx will be short-lived, and that adequate training of migrant workers would allow them to integrate into the domestic job market and provide a boost to the economy.

== Select scholarship ==
Rational Liquidity Crises in the Sovereign Debt Market: In Search of a Theory (1996)

Published in 1996, this IMF working paper prepared by Detragiache looks at the scenarios in which “creditworthy sovereign borrowers may be denied liquidity by rational creditors.” According to this paper, there can be circumstances where the “pessimistic expectations about the borrower's creditworthiness become self-fulfilling, and the borrower experiences a liquidity crisis.” This, Detragiache argues, can be avoided by ensuring the loan is marketed properly, and the actors develop a reputation for following good policies. Detragiache models the scenarios of self-fulfilling belief in models with exogenous, and then endogenous outputs. However, she makes the point that liquidity crises can also arise when entire bond markets are disrupted. The paper gives examples of this occurring when “Dealers” between buyers and sellers withdraw, and trading halts, or when a “Contagion” takes place with the default of a large bond issuer which disrupts the market.

Do Financial Sector Reforms Lead to Financial Development? Evidence from a New Dataset (2008)

This 2008 research by Detragiache and Senior IMF Economist Thierry Tressel investigates the effects of the liberalization of banking systems on credit markets. They account for the effects of institutional checks and balances on political power in the countries under consideration, as well as the enforcement of property rights. The researchers looked at a dataset of financial sector reforms in 91 different sample countries from 1973 to 2005. They conclude that the benefits of liberalization reforms have only had beneficial effects on financial deepening in countries with strong institutions to protect citizens from state or elite expropriation.

Responding to Banking Crises: Lessons from Cross-Country Evidence (2010)

Detragiache and fellow IMF economist Giang Ho wrote this working paper for the IMF in January 2010, in response to the 2008 financial crisis. To research the effects of government intervention in financial crises, the two looked at banking crises in 40 different countries occurring over the years from 1980, in Argentina, to 2003 in the Dominican Republic. They found that more fiscally risky attempts by governments to rescue failing banks do not lower the economic costs of these crises, and overall end up with worse post-crisis economic performance. They also find that parliamentary, rather than presidential, political systems are more likely to put in place costly measures to rescue banks.

In terms of the methodology that Detragiache and Ho used for this paper, they estimated an empirical model measuring economic performance during the crisis, including a policy response index which they constructed. This policy response index takes into account the magnitude of the commitment of public financial resources by the government, and ranges from a low of -2 in Argentina in 1989, to a high of 4 assigned to crises in Jamaica (1996), Sweden (1991), and Turkey (2000). The researchers controlled for long-run growth potential in the various countries, as well as world economic growth over the crisis period. They included a dummy variable to account for any IMF-supported programs in the country at the time.

== Press citations ==
Detragiache has been cited in several news sources such as The Guardian, CNNMoney, Bloomberg, Reuters Deutschland, The Telegraph and German TV station Welt.
