= Errico =

Errico is a name. Notable people with the name include:

== Given name ==
- Errico Malatesta (1853–1932), Italian anarchist
- Errico Petrella (1813–1877), Italian composer

Erricos

- Erricos Andreou (1938–2023), Greek screenwriter and film director

== Surname ==
- Andrea Errico (born 1999), Italian footballer
- Con Errico (1921–1993), American jockey
- Daniel Errico, American children's writer
- Danilo Errico (born 1953), Italian military officer
- Gaetano Errico (1791–1860), Italian priest
- Greg Errico (born 1948), American drummer and record producer
- Jan Errico, American drummer
- Melissa Errico (born 1970), American singer, writer, and actress
- Mike Errico, American singer-songwriter and music producer

D'Errico

- Alessandro D'Errico (born 1950), Italian prelate
- Alyssa D'Errico (born 1989), American volleyball player and coach
- Andrea D'Errico (born 1992), Italian footballer
- Camilla d'Errico (born 1980), Canadian artist and illustrator
- Corrado D'Errico (1902–1941), Italian screenwriter and film director
- David D'Errico (born 1952), American soccer player
- Donna D'Errico (born 1968), American actress and model
- Francesco d'Errico (born 1957), Italian archaeologist
