= Enrica Zunic' =

Italian writer

Enrica Zunic' is the pseudonym of Enrica Lozito, an Italian science-fiction writer. She lives and works in Turin. Her work is partly inspired by her activities with Amnesty International. In 2003 she won the Premio Italia award for science fiction.
