= Enrico Fazzini =

Neurologist and osteopathic physician

- Education: Boston University; University of Osteopathic Medicine and Health Sciences
- Occupation: Physician

Enrico Fazzini is an American neurologist. He is considered an expert on Parkinson's disease and has published numerous research publications on the subject. He has been involved in a number of clinical trials for new pharmaceutical treatments for Parkinson's disease. He attended the University of Osteopathic Medicine and Health Sciences in Des Moines, Iowa. He is board certified in neurology by both the M.D. and D.O. medical boards. He began his practice in 1989. Dr. Enrico Fazzini completed his neurology training at Boston University in 1987 and his fellowship in Movement Disorders at Columbia Presbyterian in 1989. In addition to being a neurologist, Fazzini has a Ph.D. in Behavioral Neuroscience from Boston University and is an expert on the diagnosis and treatment of patients with traumatic brain injuries.

== Publications ==
Fazzini's publications are listed on PubMed. Fazzini is credited with reintroducing surgical therapies utilized in the treatment of Parkinson's disease.
