= Enrico Dandolo (patriot) =

Italian patriot and soldier

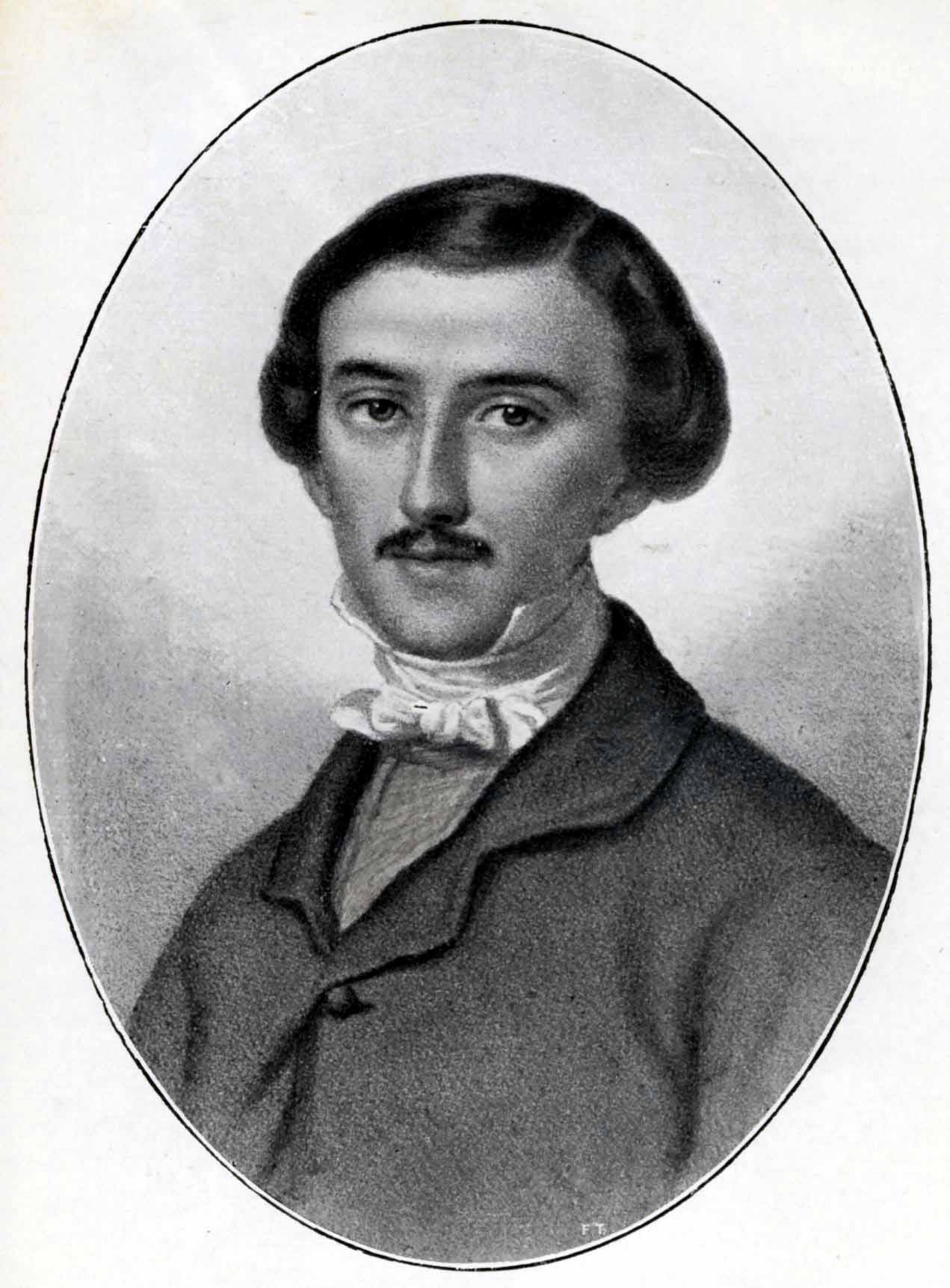
- Born: June 26, 1827; Varese
- Died: June 3, 1849 (aged 21); Rome

Enrico Dandolo (26 June 1827 in Varese – night of 3 June 1849, during the riots around Villa Corsini, Rome) was an Italian patriot and soldier who took part in the Risorgimento. He came from a family with a long tradition of participation in the Italian wars of independence. He participated in the Five Days of Milan uprising of 1848. He later joined the defence of the Roman Republic in 1849, where he met a heroic death.

== Life ==
=== Childhood and education ===
Enrico Dandolo was born in Varese as the son of Count Tullio Dandolo and Giulietta Bargnani. He spent part of his childhood (1835–1838) at his mother's villa in Adro, in the province of Brescia, in a family environment that fostered patriotic ideals. After a two-year stay in Rome with his family (1838–1840), he returned to Lombardy and continued his education at the Brera gymnasium in Milan.

His teacher was A. Mauri, while his educator was the Milanese patriot Angelo Fava, who played a significant role in shaping Dandolo's patriotic outlook. Despite his intensive studies, the young Dandolo actively engaged in the movement of spiritual renewal and independence aspirations that characterized Lombard youth in the 1840s. This environment influenced his views and prepared him for his later involvement in Italian Wars of Independence.

=== Milan uprising ===
From the outset of the insurrection in Milan in March 1848, Enrico Dandolo was one of the protagonists in the Five Days of Milan (18–22 March 1848), a pivotal episode in the Risorgimento. He served as an ordinary soldier in the volunteer unit commanded by Luciano Manara and fought on the city's barricades and streets until the capture of Porta Tosa on 22 March 1848. He shared the hardships of urban combat with his comrades.

Fighting alongside him were his friend Emilio Morosini and his younger brother Emilio Dandolo, with whom he maintained close ties based on shared patriotic ideals. Young patriots from Lombard aristocratic families constituted a significant portion of the insurgent forces and demonstrated considerable courage and determination in engagements against Austrian troops. Their participation held symbolic importance and reflected the broader engagement of Lombard society in the struggle for independence.

=== Military service and the First Italian War of Independence ===
Following the Five Days of Milan, Enrico Dandolo, gaining experience and maturity in the tactics of guerrilla warfare, took part (with the Lombard volunteers) in the Legione Manara in the Brescian and Trentine campaigns of the First Italian War of Independence. He saw combat at Castelnuovo and Lazise. On 14 April 1848, he was recalled to Milan by the commander-in-chief and appointed adjutant to General E. Perrone, commander of the Lombard division. This appointment reflected recognition of his military capabilities and dedication to the independence cause. After a period of training, the division was deployed to the front in early July 1848 and participated in the blockade of Mantua.

Following the defeat at Custozza (26–27 July 1848), the division abandoned the siege and withdrew, first to the Oglio river, where it resisted pursuing Austrian columns, and subsequently to the Adda in support of the defense of Milan. When that effort failed, the division was assigned to defend the city walls on the side facing the castle. On 7 August 1848, from headquarters in Trecate, Dandolo and Emilio Morosini received from General Perrone a certificate acknowledging their courage, zeal, and military aptitude, after which they were released from service.

Dandolo sought refuge in Lugano and stayed at the Morosini family home in nearby Vezia, a haven for numerous Italian political exiles. Several weeks later, he crossed into Piedmont to rejoin Manara's battalion. On this occasion, he was promoted to the rank of ensign, a position formerly held by his brother Emilio. The battalion was reorganized and redesignated the VI Bersaglieri. Dandolo remained with the unit for several months during exercises and training near Alessandria. It was subsequently deployed to the Ticino sector during the brief March campaign of 1849, as part of the Lombard division under General Ramorino.

=== Defence of the Roman Republic ===
Enrico Dandolo participated in the formation of the Roman Republic in 1849. Following the Piedmontese defeat at the Battle of Novara on 23 March 1849, Enrico Dandolo shared the fate of Luciano Manara. With the dissolution of their division imminent after the armistice, Manara elected to transfer his battalion to the Papal States to support the newly proclaimed Roman Republic. The battalion disembarked at Porto d'Anzio on 27 April 1849 and entered Rome on 29 April 1849. From 30 April 1849, Dandolo served as commander of the 2nd company in the army of the Roman Republic and participated in the city's defensive campaign against French, Austrian, and Neapolitan forces.

During this period, he saw combat near Palestrina and Velletri against the Neapolitan army, where Republican forces secured victories. During the battle against the French, which finally freed Rome from the insurgents, Dandolo fought at the rank of captain in the Battaglione Bersaglieri Lombardi, under the command of Luciano Manara around Porta San Pancrazio and at Villa Corsini. These clashes represented the most severe fighting of the defense, as Villa Corsini (also known as the Casino dei Quattro Venti) occupied a critical strategic position on the Janiculum hill, dominating the western approaches to Rome.

=== Death at Villa Corsini ===
The culminating engagement in the defense of the Roman Republic occurred on 3 June 1849, when French forces launched a major assault on Villa Corsini. Throughout the day, Giuseppe Garibaldi repeatedly ordered assaults to recapture the villa from the entrenched French garrison. The intense fighting resulted in heavy casualties among the defenders. During these assaults, Enrico Dandolo was mortally wounded.

He died that night in the arms of his friend Emilio Morosini, who had himself been gravely wounded in the same action. Dandolo's death came to symbolize the sacrifice of the young generation of Italian patriots who perished in the struggle for national independence. It established him as one of the figures of the heroic resistance of the Roman Republic.

== Burial and commemoration ==
The bodies of Enrico Dandolo and his friend Emilio Morosini (who died on 1 July 1849) were transported by sea to Genoa in early September 1849. After Genoese authorities denied permission to land the remains, they were conveyed to Arona, then to Magadino (now part of the municipality of Gambarogno in the canton of Ticino), and finally to Vezia. On 12 September 1849, the two were buried together in the chapel of the garden at Villa Negroni (also known as Villa Morosini). Count Tullio Dandolo, father of Enrico and Emilio, sought permission from the Austrian authorities to inter his son's remains in the family chapel at Adro (province of Brescia) but the conditions imposed by the Austrian government were deemed unacceptable by the family.

As historian G. Capasso noted, the choice of a joint burial in Vezia reflected the wish "not to disturb the brotherhood of the graves of two friends who died together for the same cause". In 1968, upon learning that the chapel in Vezia had fallen into disuse, residents of Adro secured authorization for the exhumation and transfer of Dandolo's remains to the family chapel in their community. The transfer occurred in September 1968, with expenses borne by the municipality of Adro. The ceremony was attended by Vitaliano Alfani, president of the Italian Hospital in Lugano; Giulio Pasolini, mayor of Adro; and Luigi De Giovanni, Consul General of Italy in Lugano. The event coincided with a national gathering of the Bersaglieri corps, which convened in Adro to pay tribute to Dandolo as one of its heroic members.

== See also ==
- Luciano Manara
- Emilio Morosini
- Five Days of Milan
