= Luciano Manara =

Milanese soldier and politician

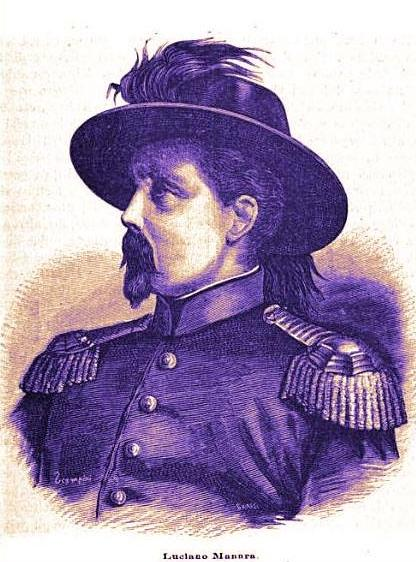
Luciano Manara

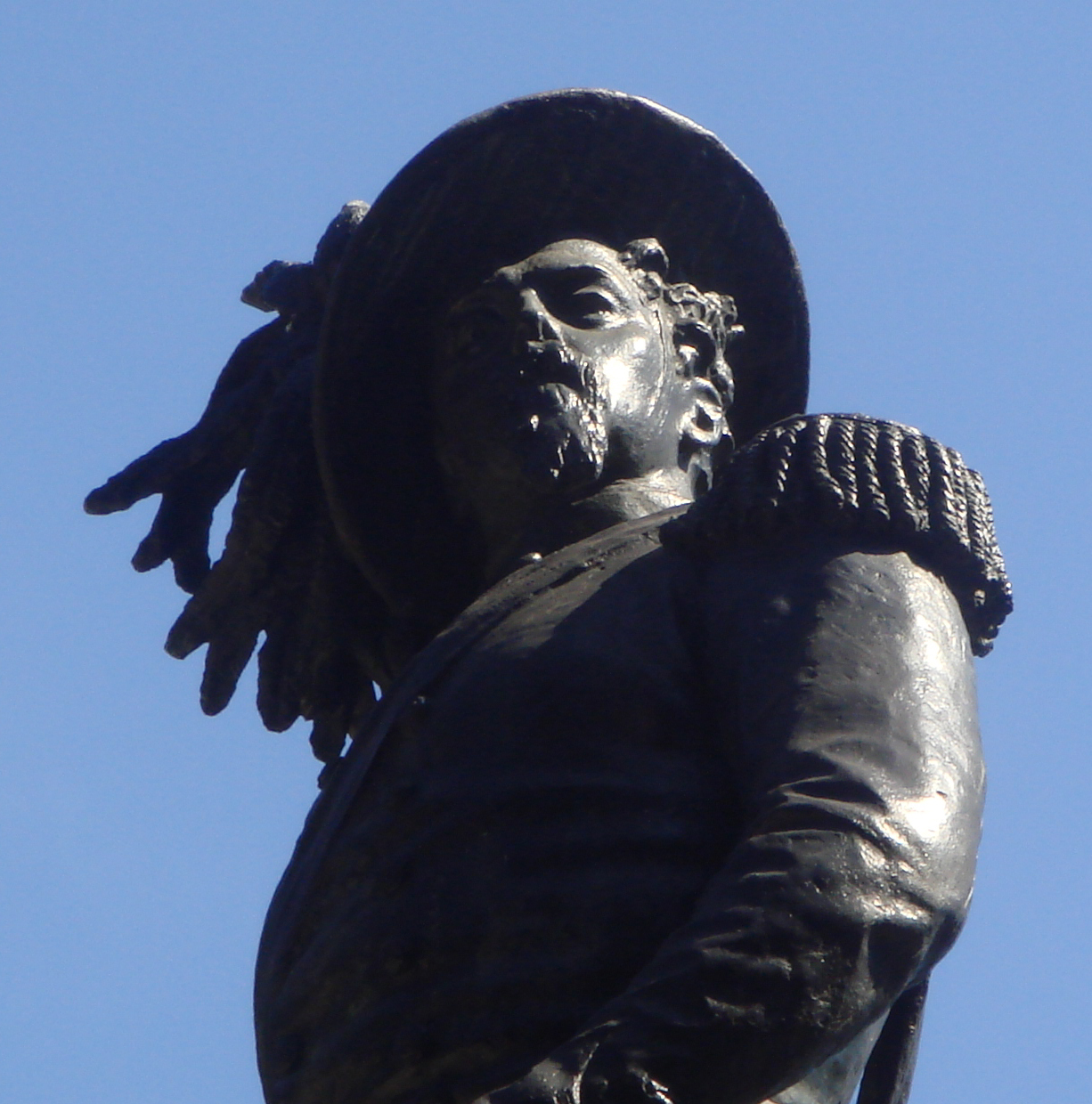
1894 bronze monument to Luciano Manara, in the Public Gardens of Milan by sculptor Francesco Barzaghi, completed by E. Cassi

Luciano Manara (23 March 1825 – 30 June 1849) was a Milanese soldier and politician of the Risorgimento era, who took part in the Roman Republic, and died defending it.

== Life ==
Manara was born in Milan in 1825 Sant'Andrea district in Milan, into a wealthy bourgeois family of the city, the son of Filippo and Maria Luca.

Manara was a friend of Carlo Cattaneo and completed his secondary schooling in Milan. He attended classes at the naval school in Venice and between 1840 and 1846 stayed for long periods in Germany and France. He married Carmelita Fe on 10 September 1843 in Antegnate and with her had three children: Filippo, Giuseppe and Pio Luciano.

In his youth Manara used to spend his summer holidays in Antegnate, a town in the lower Bergamo area, and there his passion for music led him, although only 20 years old, to establish a small music school, personally covering the costs of purchasing the instruments. That small music school has today become one of the oldest active Bergamo-area bands, the "Corpo Musicale Luciano Manara", which has borne his name since 1845.

His brother Achille married Countess Amazilia Pacini, daughter of the Catania-born composer Giovanni Pacini.

=== The war in northern Italy ===
In 1848, Manara participated in the Five Days of Milan (leading, among others, the operation that led to the capture of Porta Tosa, which thus, shortly after the Unification of Italy, became Porta Vittoria) and in the First Italian War of Independence of 1848, in the service of the Provisional Government of Milan, with a group of 500 volunteers he himself had organized, the Bersaglieri Lombardi.

Commissioned, with the rank of major, in the Lombard Volunteer Corps of General Michele Allemandi, in April he took part in the invasion of Trentino with the task of occupying Trento, thus cutting the route of the Adige valley to Austrian reinforcements bound for the Quadrilatero fortresses; the operation was halted by the Austrians at Vezzano on 15 April, a few kilometres from Trento. On 20 July, in the Battle of Sclemo, near Stenico, despite the courage shown, Manara was heavily defeated by the 2,000 Austrians of Major Pompeius Scharinger von Lamazon and was forced to retreat into Stenico Castle. With the reorganization of the Volunteer Observation Corps of Tyrol entrusted to General Giacomo Durando, in the summer he took part in operations to control the Trentino border, operating in Valle Sabbia and on Monte Stino.

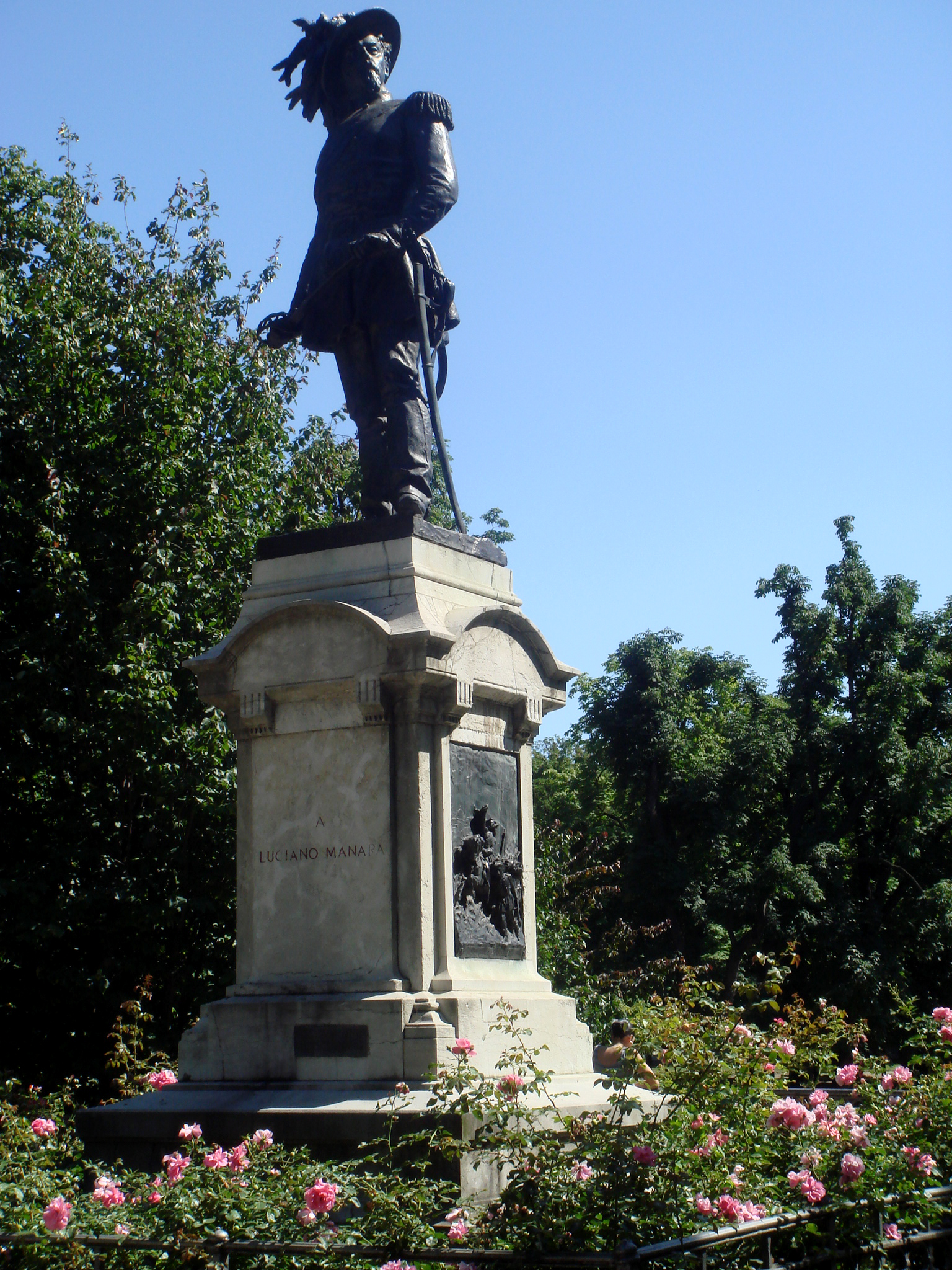
Monument in Milan

On the Austrians' return, he fled in August, with his column of volunteers, to Piedmont, where he was placed in command, with the rank of major in the Piedmontese army, of a corps of Bersaglieri and assigned to the Lombard division commanded by General Gerolamo Ramorino. During the brief resumption of the war against Austria in 1849, Manara fought with his unit on the Po and at La Cava (today's Cava Manara, in the province of Pavia, which took its new name in his honour).

=== The war in central Italy and death ===
After the defeat of the Savoyard army in the Battle of Novara, he left Piedmont to take part in the defence of the Roman Republic.

On 22 April 1849, with his 600 Bersaglieri, he departed from Portofino for Civitavecchia on two boats and reached Rome on the 29th.

After several engagements against Bourbon troops in the surroundings of the city, he was promoted to lieutenant colonel and later to colonel. On 16 May, with his brigade, he left Rome and, together with the republican forces, occupied first Anagni and then Frosinone.

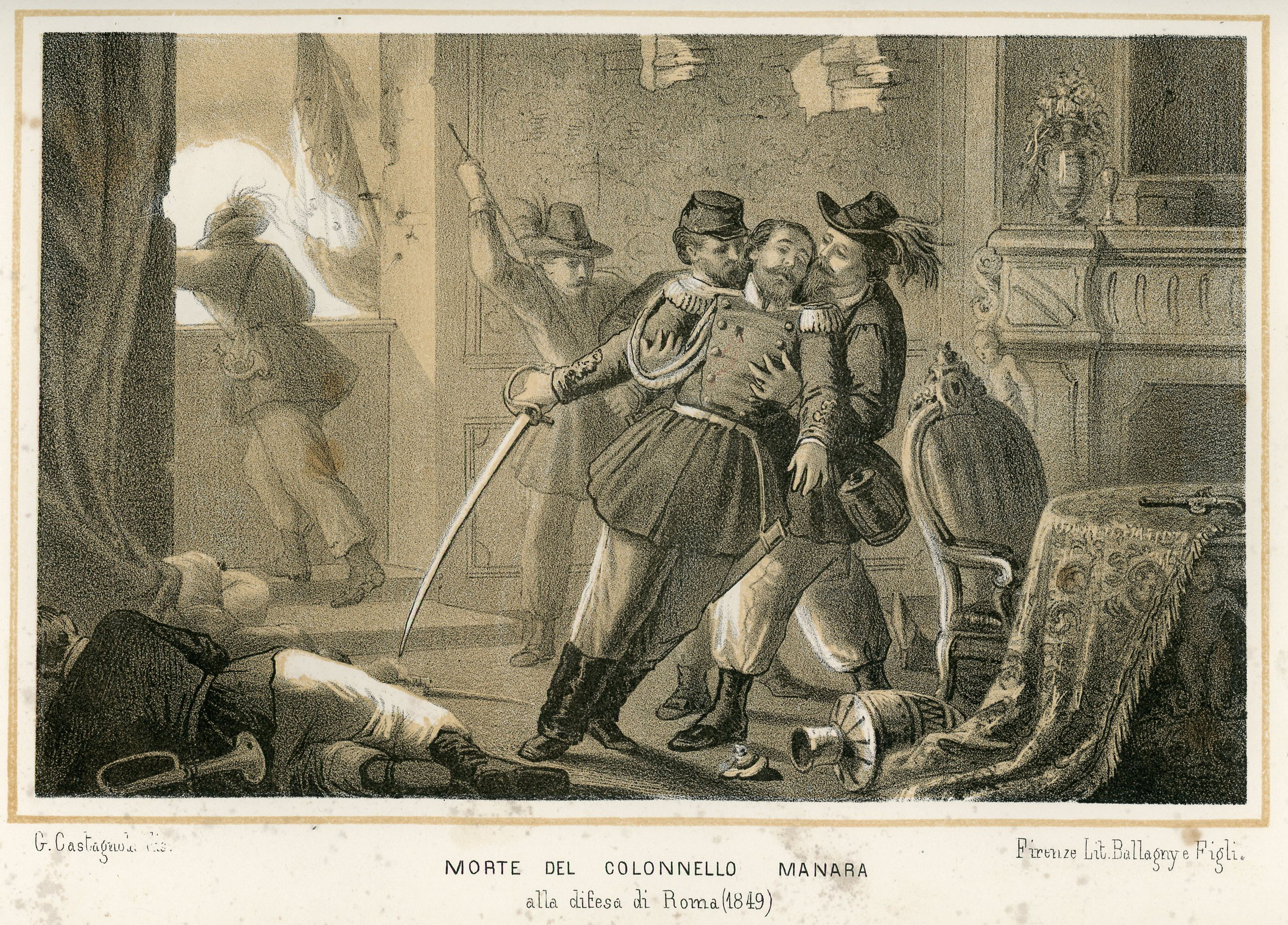
Death of Colonel Manara

From 3 June the French under General Oudinot attacked Rome and its Roman Republic. Defences were organized against the overwhelming enemy forces and Garibaldi appointed him Chief of Staff. After fierce fighting, on 30 June, during the defence of Villa Spada, he was mortally wounded, and died the same day, aged only 24. Before his death, Manara was able to write in a letter to his friend Francesca "Fanny" Bonacina Spini the memorable words: "We must die to close the Forty-Eight in earnest; for our example to be effective, we must die".

=== The difficult funeral rites ===
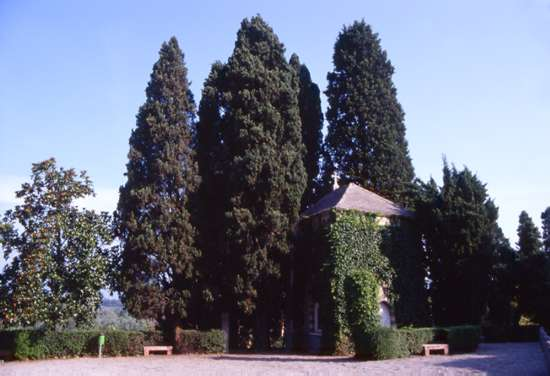
Luciano Manara's tomb at Barzanò

His funeral was held at the church of San Lorenzo in Lucina, with the homily spoken by Don Ugo Bassi. For a short time his body remained in Rome, since his mother was unable to gain permission from the Austrian authorities in Vienna to have it taken to Milan. Together with the remains of Emilio Morosini and Enrico Dandolo (the latter having been killed at Villa Corsini), it was eventually brought by sea to Genoa and from there to Vezia (Lugano).

After continued insistence and petitions, in 1853 the Austrian emperor Franz Joseph granted permission for the body to be taken to Barzanò (where the Manara family had a villa), so long as its progress and reburial there was "strictly private". Only in 1864, after the Unification of Italy, was the Manara family allowed to erect their family monument tomb.

== Bibliography ==
- Soldavini, Dino (2011) [2003]. Luciano Manara (PDF).
