= Emilio Morosini =

Italian patriot

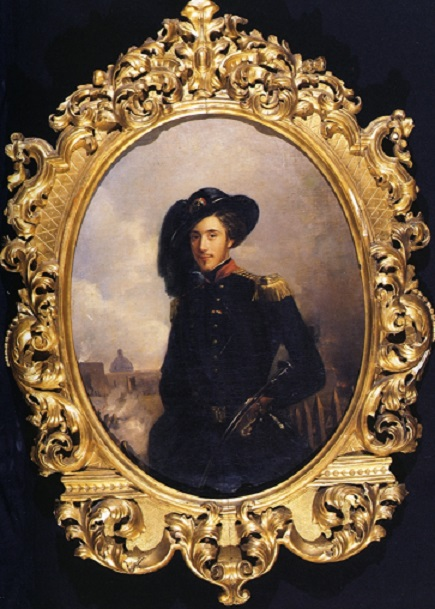
Antonietta Bisi, Emilio Morosini

Emilio Morosini (1830 – 1 July 1849) was an Italian patriot who participated in the Risorgimento.

Morosini was born in Varese. Educated in Fava and studying at the Gymnasium in Brera and the liceo at Porta Nuova, he became friends with Enrico Dandolo and Luciano Manara and fought in the Five Days of Milan in 1848. In 1849 he and Manara were among the defenders of the Roman Republic. While battling against the French troops besieging the Janiculum, Morosini was seriously wounded on 29 June, and he died two days later of his wounds.
