= Vezia =

- Municipality
- Flag Coat of arms
- Location of Vezia
- Location within Switzerland Location within Canton of Ticino
- Coordinates: 46°1′N 8°56′E
- Country: Switzerland
- Canton: Ticino
- District: Lugano

Government
  - Mayor: Sindaco

Area
  - Total: 1.39 km^{2} (0.54 sq mi)
- Elevation: 370 m (1,210 ft)

Population (December 2004)
  - Total: 1,786
  - Density: 1,280/km^{2} (3,330/sq mi)
- Time zone: UTC+01:00 (CET)
  - Summer (DST): UTC+02:00 (CEST)
- Postal code: 6943
- SFOS number: 5231
- ISO 3166 code: CH-TI
- Surrounded by: Bioggio, Cadempino, Cureglia, Lugano, Manno, Porza, Savosa
- Website: www.vezia.ch

Vezia is a municipality in the district of Lugano in the canton of Ticino in Switzerland.

== Geography ==
Aerial view (1964)

Vezia has an area, as of 1997, of 1.39 square kilometers (0.54 sq mi). Of this area, 0.68 km^{2} (0.26 sq mi) or 48.9% is used for agricultural purposes, while 0.39 km^{2} (0.15 sq mi) or 28.1% is forested. Of the rest of the land, 0.68 km^{2} (0.26 sq mi) or 48.9% is settled (buildings or roads).

Of the built up area, industrial buildings made up 2.9% of the total area while housing and buildings made up 26.6% and transportation infrastructure made up 15.1%. while parks, green belts and sports fields made up 4.3%. Out of the forested land, 23.0% of the total land area is heavily forested and 5.0% is covered with orchards or small clusters of trees. Of the agricultural land, 16.5% is used for growing crops, while 5.8% is used for orchards or vine crops and 26.6% is used for alpine pastures.

== Coat of arms ==
The blazon of the municipal coat of arms is Argent a rose azure barbed and on a stalk with two yet branches leaved vert and in the chief gules a cross of the first.

== Demographics ==
Vezia has a population (as of December 2020) of 1,879. As of 2008, 25.5% of the population are resident foreign nationals. Over the last 10 years (1997–2007) the population has changed at a rate of 18.8%.

Most of the population (as of 2000) speaks Italian (85.5%), with German being second most common (6.1%) and French being third (1.8%). Of the Swiss national languages (as of 2000), 96 speak German, 29 people speak French, 1,347 people speak Italian, and 3 people speak Romansh. The remainder (100 people) speak another language.

As of 2008, the gender distribution of the population was 48.7% male and 51.3% female. The population was made up of 669 Swiss men (34.3% of the population), and 281 (14.4%) non-Swiss men. There were 798 Swiss women (40.9%), and 202 (10.4%) non-Swiss women.

In 2008 there were 21 live births to Swiss citizens and 4 births to non-Swiss citizens, and in same time span there were 7 deaths of Swiss citizens and 3 non-Swiss citizen deaths. Ignoring immigration and emigration, the population of Swiss citizens increased by 14 while the foreign population increased by 1. There were 2 Swiss men and 1 Swiss woman who immigrated back to Switzerland. At the same time, there were 6 non-Swiss men and 1 non-Swiss woman who immigrated from another country to Switzerland. The total Swiss population change in 2008 (from all sources, including moves across municipal borders) was an increase of 40 and the non-Swiss population change was an increase of 5 people. This represents a population growth rate of 2.4%.

The age distribution, as of 2009, in Vezia is; 217 children or 11.1% of the population are between 0 and 9 years old and 182 teenagers or 9.3% are between 10 and 19. Of the adult population, 207 people or 10.6% of the population are between 20 and 29 years old. 302 people or 15.5% are between 30 and 39, 348 people or 17.8% are between 40 and 49, and 253 people or 13.0% are between 50 and 59. The senior population distribution is 238 people or 12.2% of the population are between 60 and 69 years old, 132 people or 6.8% are between 70 and 79, there are 71 people or 3.6% who are over 80.

As of 2000, there were 671 private households in the municipality, and an average of 2.3 persons per household. In 2000 there were 200 single family homes (or 56.7% of the total) out of a total of 353 inhabited buildings. There were 76 two family buildings (21.5%) and 50 multi-family buildings (14.2%). There were also 27 buildings in the municipality that were multipurpose buildings (used for both housing and commercial or another purpose).

The vacancy rate for the municipality, in 2008, was 0.24%. In 2000 there were 733 apartments in the municipality. The most common apartment size was the 4 room apartment of which there were 237. There were 44 single room apartments and 177 apartments with five or more rooms. Of these apartments, a total of 663 apartments (90.5% of the total) were permanently occupied, while 58 apartments (7.9%) were seasonally occupied and 12 apartments (1.6%) were empty. As of 2007, the construction rate of new housing units was 11.8 new units per 1000 residents.

The historical population is given in the following chart:

== Heritage sites of national significance ==
S. Martino, a medieval settlement and place of worship and the Villa Negroni with its park are listed as Swiss heritage site of national significance.

== Politics ==
In the 2007 federal election the most popular party was the FDP which received 30.2% of the vote. The next three most popular parties were the CVP (18.37%), the Ticino League (17.86%) and the SP (15.23%). In the federal election, a total of 554 votes were cast, and the voter turnout was 49.1%.

In the 2007 Gran Consiglio election, there were a total of 1,104 registered voters in Vezia, of which 712 or 64.5% voted. 11 blank ballots and 2 null ballots were cast, leaving 699 valid ballots in the election. The most popular party was the PLRT which received 189 or 27.0% of the vote. The next three most popular parties were; the LEGA (with 133 or 19.0%), the SSI (with 107 or 15.3%) and the PPD+GenGiova (with 98 or 14.0%).

In the 2007 Consiglio di Stato election, 8 blank ballots were cast, leaving 704 valid ballots in the election. The most popular party was the LEGA which received 191 or 27.1% of the vote. The next three most popular parties were; the PLRT (with 175 or 24.9%), the PS (with 108 or 15.3%) and the SSI (with 98 or 13.9%).

== Economy ==
As of 2007, Vezia had an unemployment rate of 4.23%. As of 2005, there were 29 people employed in the primary economic sector and about 2 businesses involved in this sector. 131 people were employed in the secondary sector and there were 18 businesses in this sector. 599 people were employed in the tertiary sector, with 80 businesses in this sector. There were 773 residents of the municipality who were employed in some capacity, of which females made up 41.8% of the workforce.

In 2000, there were 637 workers who commuted into the municipality and 628 workers who commuted away. The municipality is a net importer of workers, with about 1.0 workers entering the municipality for every one leaving. About 17.4% of the workforce coming into Vezia are coming from outside Switzerland. Of the working population, 16.3% used public transportation to get to work, and 58.2% used a private car.

As of 2009, there was one hotel in Vezia.

== Religion ==
From the 2000 census, 1,229 or 78.0% were Roman Catholic, while 110 or 7.0% belonged to the Swiss Reformed Church. There are 185 individuals (or about 11.75% of the population) who belong to another church (not listed on the census), and 51 individuals (or about 3.24% of the population) did not answer the question.

== Education ==
In Vezia about 69.3% of the population (between age 25-64) have completed either non-mandatory upper secondary education or additional higher education (either university or a Fachhochschule).

In Vezia there were a total of 325 students (as of 2009). The Ticino education system provides up to three years of non-mandatory kindergarten and in Vezia there were 54 children in kindergarten. The primary school program lasts for five years and includes both a standard school and a special school. In the municipality, 120 students attended the standard primary schools and 2 students attended the special school. In the lower secondary school system, students either attend a two-year middle school followed by a two-year pre-apprenticeship or they attend a four-year program to prepare for higher education. There were 68 students in the two-year middle school and 1 in their pre-apprenticeship, while 31 students were in the four-year advanced program.

The upper secondary school includes several options, but at the end of the upper secondary program, a student will be prepared to enter a trade or to continue on to a university or college. In Ticino, vocational students may either attend school while working on their internship or apprenticeship (which takes three or four years) or may attend school followed by an internship or apprenticeship (which takes one year as a full-time student or one and a half to two years as a part-time student). There were 16 vocational students who were attending school full-time and 29 who attend part-time.

The professional program lasts three years and prepares a student for a job in engineering, nursing, computer science, business, tourism and similar fields. There were 4 students in the professional program.

As of 2000, there were 6 students in Vezia who came from another municipality, while 147 residents attended schools outside the municipality.
