= Plebiscites on Italian Unity =

Unification of Italy (the Risorgimento) 1815-1870

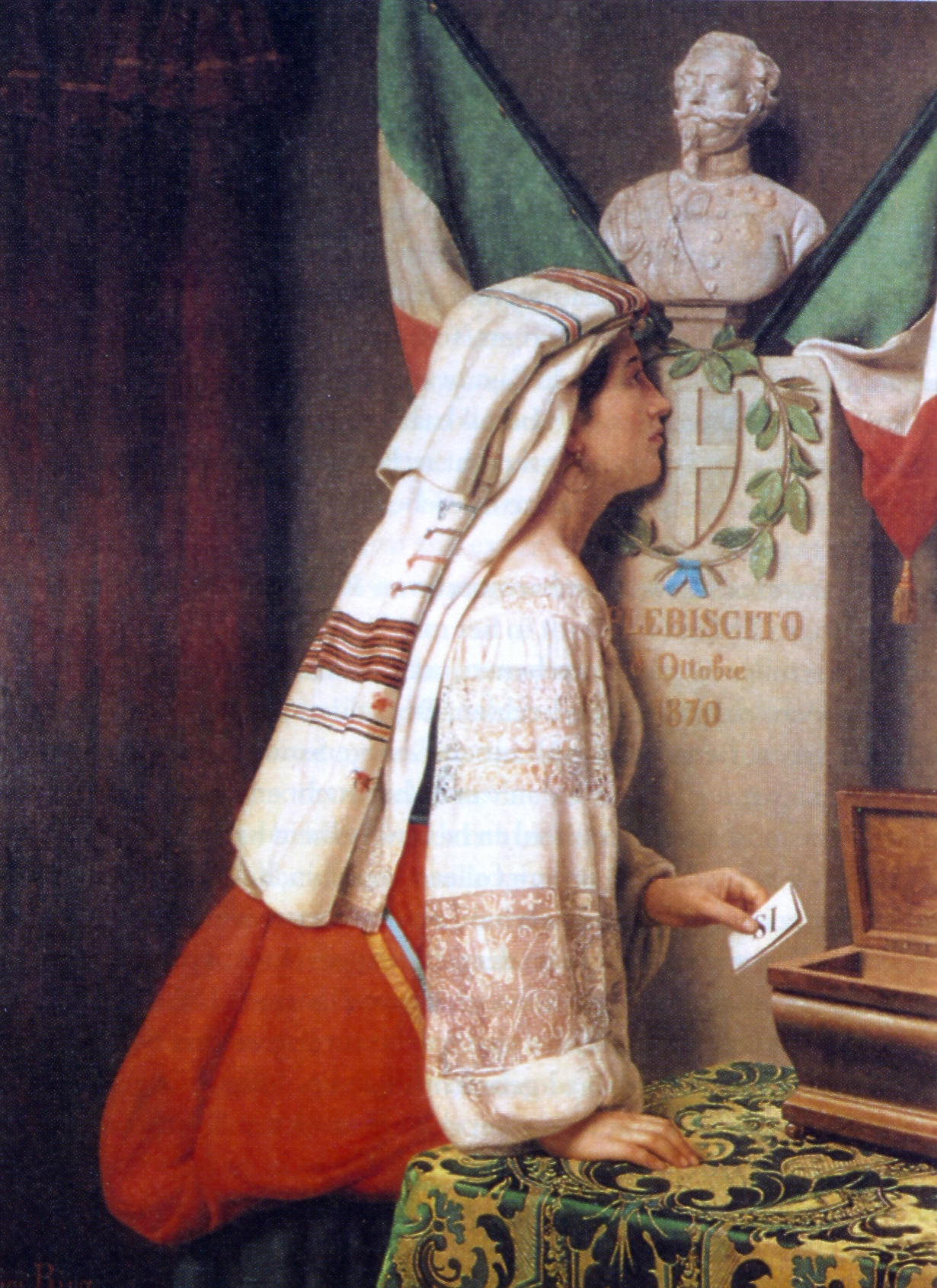
Luigi Riva, Roman Plebiscite

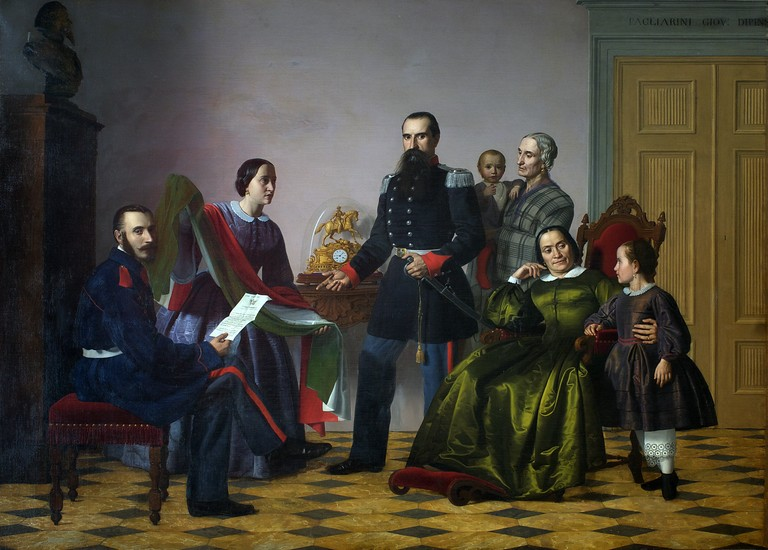
Giovanni Pagliarini, La Family of the Plebiscite (1860)

The Plebiscites on Italian unity were the votes held in various territories of the Italian peninsula to ratify their annexation first by the Kingdom of Sardinia and later by the Kingdom of Italy, thereby leading to the unification of Italy. In particular, Law no. 4497 of 3 December 1860 of the Kingdom of Sardinia granted the government the power to accept, by royal decree, the annexation of those provinces of central and southern Italy that had autonomously expressed, through direct universal (male) suffrage, the wish to become part of the Kingdom.

== Plebiscites of 1848 ==
=== Duchy of Parma and Piacenza ===
On March 26, 1848, the Austrians evacuated the castle of Piacenza and on the same day a provisional government was established in the city. With an act of April 7, it was established that the citizens could vote to decide that the territory could be joined to another state. Voting then took place between April 10 and May 2 1848. As Piacenza was the first territory that voted for unification, Charles Albert of Sardinia called “the firstborn” (“primagenita”) city of the new united Italy. However with the defeat of Sardinia the First Italian War of Independence, Charles II of Parma was restored and the result of the plebiscite was overturned.

Results	Votes	%
Votes for joining Sardinia	37 089	98.84%
Votes for joining the Papal States	352	0.94%
Votes for joining the Kingdom of Lombardy–Venetia	62	0.17%
Votes for rejoining the Duchy of Parma	11	0.03%
Votes for joining the Grand Duchy of Tuscany	10	0.03%
↳ Total votes	37 585	100%
↳ Valid votes	37 524	99.84%
↳ Undetermined votes	61	0.16%

In Parma, by an act dated May 8th, the local provisional government opened its own voting process, with counting taking place between May 20th and 24th May.

Results	Votes	%
Votes for joining Sardinia	37 451	94.09%
Votes for Charles II of Parma	1 656	4.16%
Votes for joining the Papal States	530	1.33%
Votes for joining the Grand Duchy of Tuscany	158	0.40%
Other votes	8	0.02%
↳ Total votes	39 904	100%
↳ Valid votes	39 803	99.75%
↳ Undetermined votes	101	0.25%

=== Lombardy ===
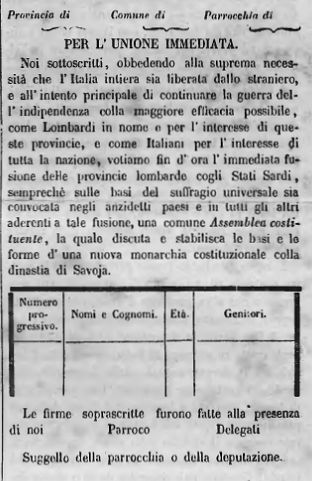
Register for voting in favour of immediate union with Sardinia

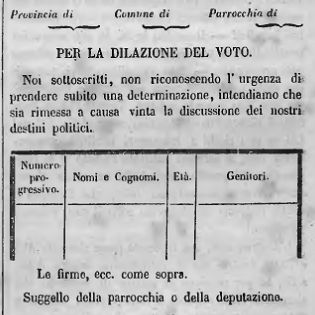
Register for voting in favour of delayed union with Sardinia

After the Five Days of Milan, the provisional government of Lombardy established the voting procedure with a decree dated 12 May 1848. Voting, open to male residents over the age of 21, was conducted in public and took place until 29 May by signing special registers held in the parishes; the registers contained two separate lists with the following proposals:

For immediate union. We, the undersigned, obeying the supreme necessity of liberating all of Italy from foreign rule, and the primary aim of continuing the war of independence with the greatest possible effectiveness, as Lombards in the name and for the interests of these provinces, and as Italians for the interests of the entire nation, hereby vote for the immediate fusion of the Lombard provinces with the Sardinian States, provided that a joint Constituent Assembly is convened in the aforementioned countries and in all other countries adhering to such a fusion, on the basis of universal suffrage, to discuss and establish the foundations and forms of a new constitutional monarchy with the Savoy dynasty.

For the postponement of the vote. We, the undersigned, not recognising the urgency of making an immediate decision, intend that the discussion of our political destinies be postponed until the issue has been won.

Republicans in Lombardy opposed the plebiscite. A Protest against the law of May 12 was published accusing the provisional government of having betrayed its mandate. Most of the signatories were republicans, including Giuseppe Mazzini, Giuseppe Sirtori, Pietro Maestri, Romolo Griffini, Carlo Tenca, Emilio Visconti Venosta, Enrico Cernuschi and Francesco Brioschi. On May 29, the last day of voting, Fortunato Urbino tried to mobilise discontent to force the provisional government to resign and establish a republican government, but he was unsuccessful. Indeed the provisional government exploited his actions by claiming that he was in the pay of the Austrians.

The result saw a clear majority in favour of immediate union with Sardinia. During the voting period there were disputes over the official number of those entitled to vote. In Milan, 30,000 were initially indicated as having the right to vote, but 32,600 signatures were received; the number of those entitled to vote was then corrected to 34,000, but other sources indicated a higher number of abstentions than the official numbers indicated.

Risultati	Number	%
For immediate union with Sardinia	561 002	99,88%
For delaying the vote	681	0,12%
Registered	661 626	
↳ Voted	n.d.	n.d.
↳ Valid votes	561 683	n.d.
↳ Invalid votes	n.d.	n.d.

The mayor of Milan, Gabrio Casati, led a delegation that delivered the results to Charles Albert of Savoy on 11 June. The annexation was formalised by the Sardinian parliament with laws of 11 July and 27 July 1848. The results of the plebiscite were however soon rendered meaningless by the Austrian military victories that, as in Piacenza and Parma, ended Sardinian rule. After the Armistice of Villafranca in 1859 when Sardinia regained control of Lombardy it considered the results of the 1848 plebiscites still valid, so no new official voting on annexation took place. However the municipalities of Como and Lecco decide£ to hold their own local plebiscites, which reconfirmed the 1848 results.

=== Venetian territory ===
Within the territories of the Austrian Kingdom of Lombardy–Venetia that had formerly been part of the Republic of Venice, not all conducted plebiscites in 1848. The city of Venice itself proclaimed the Republic of San Marco, and a number of other cities decided to join it. In these cities there was less public enthusiasm for joining Sardinia. However several other cities were inclined to prefer immediate fusion with Sardinia, particularly as this would hopefully mean protection against returning Austrian armies. The departmental committees of Padua, Vicenza, Rovigo and Treviso decided to follow the Lombard example and established public registers similar to those used in Lombardy, with voting open until 29 May.

Padua	Number	%
For immediate union with Sardinia	62 259	98,42%
For delaying the vote	1 002	1,58%
Registered	n.a.	
↳ Voting	n.a.	n.a.
↳ Valid votes	63 261	n.a.
↳ Invalid votes	n.a.	n.a.

Vicenza	Number	%
For immediate union with Sardinia	56 328	99,09%
For delaying the vote	520	0,91%
Registered	n.a.	
↳ Voting	n.a.	n.a.
↳ Valid votes	56 848	n.a.
↳ Invalid votes	n.a.	n.a.

Rovigo	Number	%
For immediate union with Sardinia	23 605	94,87%
For delaying the vote	1 276	5,13%
Registered	n.a.	
↳ Voting	n.a.	n.a.
↳ Valid votes	24 881	n.a.
↳ Invalid votes	n.a.	n.a.

Treviso	Number	%
For immediate union with Sardinia	2 975	99,43%
For delaying the vote	17	0,57%
Registered	n.a.	
↳ Voting	n.a.	n.a.
↳ Valid votes	2 992	n.a.
↳ Invalid votes	n.a.	n.a.

== Plebiscite of 1859 ==
After the Armistice of Villafranca in 1859, the Duchies of Parma and Piacenza decided to hold a second plebiscite on 14 August on union with Sardinia. However this plebiscite was not recognized by the Sardinian extraordinary governor Luigi Carlo Farini, who instead authorised the establishment of a representative assembly. On 14 August a vote was also held in Modena to elect an assembly, which unanimously approved union with the Kingdom of Sardinia on 21 August.

Parma and Piacenza	Number	%
For union with Sardinia	63,176	?
Against	504	?

== Plebiscites of 1860 ==
=== Provinces of Emilia ===
The plebiscite of the royal provinces of Emilia, also known in their respective territories as the plebiscite of the provinces of Parma and Modena and the plebiscite of the Romagna, took place on Sunday 11 and Monday 12 March 1860 to sanction the annexation to the Kingdom of Sardinia of the former Duchy of Parma and Piacenza, the former Duchy of Modena (which also included the territory of Massa, now in Tuscany) and the Legation of Romagna (which was part of the Papal State). The results of the plebiscite were announced on 18 March, and on the same day royal decree 4004 gave it immediate effect. On 31 March the provisional government of the Provinces of Emilia was dissolved.

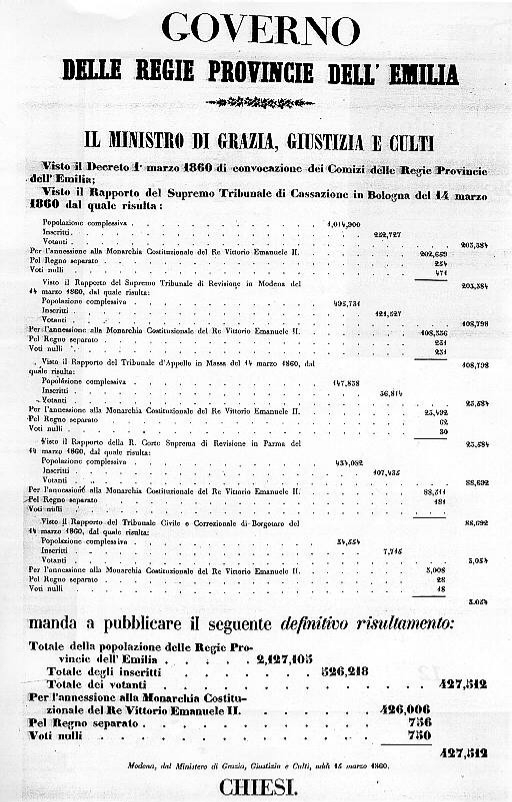
Announcement of the results

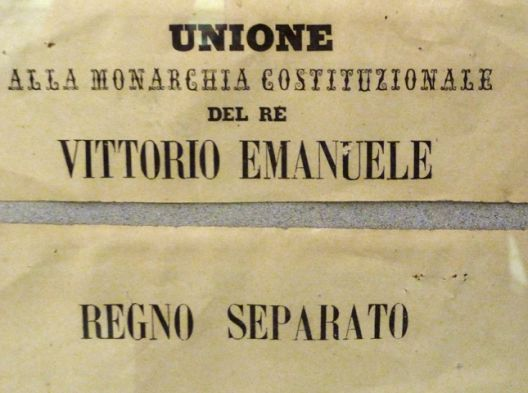
Plebiscite voting card, Bologna

Overall results	Number	%
For annexation to the constitutional monarchy of king Victor Emmanuel II	426.006	99,82%
For a separate kingdom	756	0,18%
Population	2.127.105	
Registered	526.218	
↳ Voting	427.512	79,79%
↳ Valid votes	426.762	99,82%
↳ Invalid votes	750	0,18%

==== Local results ====
Legations of Romagna	Number	%
Annexation	202.659	99,87%
Separate kingdom	254	0,13%
Population	1.014.900	
Registered	252.727	
↳ Voting	203.384	80,48%
↳ Valid votes	202.913	99,77%
↳ Invalid votes	471	0,23%

Province of Modena	Numero	%
Annexation	108.336	99,79%
Separate kingdom	231	0,21%
Population	495.731	
Registered	131.527	
↳ Voting	108.798	82,72%
↳ Valid votes	108.567	99,79%
↳ Invalid votes	231	0,21%

Province of Massa	Numero	%
Annexation	23.492	99,74%
Separate kingdom	62	0,26%
Population	147.938	
Registered	36.814	
↳ Voting	23.584	64,06%
↳ Valid votes	23.554	99,87%
↳ Invalid votes	30	0,13%

Province of Parma	Numero	%
Annexation	88.511	99,80%
Separate kingdom	181	0,20%
Population	434.082	
Registered	107.435	
↳ Voting	88.692	82,52%
↳ Valid votes	88.692	100,00%
↳ Invalid votes	0	0,00%

Province of Borgotaro	Numero	%
Annexation	3.008	99,08%
Separate kingdom	28	0,92%
Population	34.554	
Registered	7.715	
↳ Voting	3.054	39,59%
↳ Valid votes	3.036	99,41%
↳ Invalid votes	18	0,59%

=== Grand Duchy of Tuscany ===
On 22 March 1860, after a plebiscite on 11 and 12 March 1860 that voted overwhelmingly in favour of a union, Tuscany was formally annexed to Sardinia.

Results	Number	%
For union	366 571	96,09%
For a separate kingdom	14 925	3,91%
Registered	n.d.	
↳ Voting	386 445	
↳ Valid votes	381 496	98,72%
↳ Invalid votes	4 949	1,28%

=== Nice and Savoy ===
While the other plebiscites between 1848 and 1870 were concerned with the question of whether other territories should be united with Sardinia, the plebiscites in Savoy and the County of Nice were to determine whether these terrishould leave Sardinia and join the Second French Empire. A plebiscite was held in Nuce on April 15 and 16, 1860. The opponents of annexation called for abstention, which resulted in a very high abstention rate. The "Yes" vote won 83% of registered voters throughout the county of Nice and 86% in Nice, partly thanks to pressure from the authorities. in Savoy, voting took place on April 21 and 22, 1860, and proceeded in an orderly manner, with the outcome widely anticipated in advance.

Nice	Number	%
Yes	25 743	99,38%
No	160	0,62%
Registered	30 712	
↳ Voting	25 933	84,44%
↳ Valid votes	25 903	99,88%
↳ Invalid votes	30	0,12%

Savoy	Number	%
Yes	130 533	99,82%
No	235	0,18%
Registered	135 449	
↳ Voting	130 839	96,60%
↳ Valid votes	130 768	99,95%
↳ Invalid votes	71	0,05%

=== Kingdom of the Two Sicilies ===
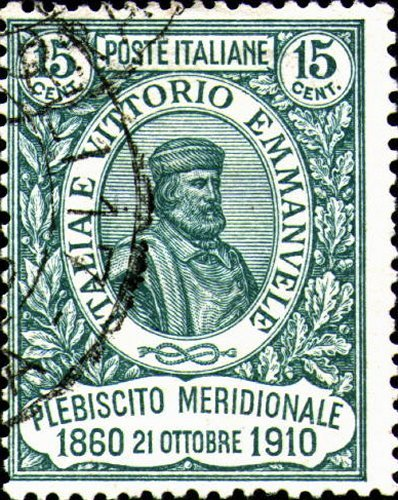
Stamp of the Kingdom of Italy commemorating the 50th anniversary of the plebiscite in the Two Sicilies

Two separate plebiscites were held, one for the Sicilian provinces and one for the Neapolitan ones. Both took place on 21 October 1860, with the question: Do the people want a One and Indivisible Italy with Victor Emmanuel as constitutional King and his legitimate descendants? The patriot it:Marianna De Crescenzo was allowed to vote in this plebiscite, the only woman admitted to vote and probably the first woman to vote in a consultation in Italy.

Neapolitan provinces	Number	%
Yes	1 302 064	99,21%
No	10 312	0,79%
Registered	n.a.	
↳ Voting	n.a.	n.a.
↳ Valid votes	1 312 376	n.a.
↳ Invalid votes	n.a.	n.a.

Siciluan provinces	Number	%
Yes	432 053	99,85%
No	667	0,15%
Registered	n.a.	
↳ Voting	n.a.	n.a.
↳ Valid votes	432 720	n.a.
↳ Invalid votes	n.a.	n.a.

The annexations were formalised with royal decrees of 17 December 1860, nos. 4498 and 4499 («The Neapolitan provinces are part of the Kingdom of Italy» and «The Sicilian provinces are part of the Kingdom of Italy»).

=== Legations of the Marches and Umbria ===
The plebiscites for the annexation of the legations of Marche and Umbria to the Kingdom of Italy took place on 4 and 5 November 1860. The plebiscite question was: Do you want to be part of the constitutional monarchy of King Victor Emmanuel II?

Legation of Marche	Number	%
Yes	133 783	99,10%
No	1 212	0,90%
Registered	167 326	
↳ Voting	135 255	80,83%
↳ Valid votes	134 995	99,81%
↳ Invalid votes	260	0,19%

Legation of Umbria	Number	%
Yes	97 040	99,61%
No	380	0,39%
Registered	123 011	
↳ Voting	97 625	79,36%
↳ Valid votes	97 420	99,79%
↳ Invalid votes	205	0,21%

The annexation of the Marche was formalized with royal decree no. 4500 of 17 December 1860, while the annexation of Umbria with royal decree no. 4501 of 17 December 1860. In this plebiscite, the vote was exceptionally granted to the poet and patriot Maria Alinda Bonacci Brunamonti, the only woman to be granted the vote.

== Plebiscite of 1866 ==
=== Veneto provinces and the province of Mantua ===
The plebiscite for the annexation of the Venetian provinces and the province of Mantua to the Kingdom of Italy took place on 21 and 22 October 1866 with the question: We declare our union with the Kingdom of Italy under the constitutional monarchical government of King Victor Emmanuel II and his successors. The Venetian provinces included the Province of Friuli, corresponding to the current provinces of Udine and Pordenone.

== Plebiscite of 1870 ==
=== Rome ===
After the capture of Rome, the government of the Kingdom proclaimed the right of the Romans to choose the government they desired. As had been done for the other Italian provinces, a plebiscite was also called in Rome to sanction the reunification of the city with the Kingdom of Italy. The wording initially proposed included the formula "With the certainty that the Italian government will ensure the independence of the spiritual authority of the Pope, ...". This premise was then deemed redundant and the question actually asked was: "We wish to be united with the Kingdom of Italy, under the constitutional monarchy of King Victor Emmanuel II and his successors."

The plebiscite took place on 2 October 1870, a Sunday. The results in the city of Rome itself saw an overwhelming victory of “yesl votes, 40,785, against only 46 “no” votes. The result in the province of Rome outside the city was 77,520 "yes" against 857 "no". In the whole territory the results were 133,681 "yes" against 1,507 "no". These results partially reflected the fact that the Catholic Church directed people to abstain from voting.

Results	Number	%
Yes	133 681	98,89%
No	1 507	1,11%
Registerec	167 548	
↳ Voting	135 291	80,75%
↳ Valid votes	135 188	99,92%
↳ Invalid votes	103	0,08%

The annexation was formalised with royal decree 9 October 1870, n. 5903, which in art. 1 established «Rome and the Roman provinces are part of the Kingdom of Italy».
