= Andrea Verga =

Italian psychiatrist

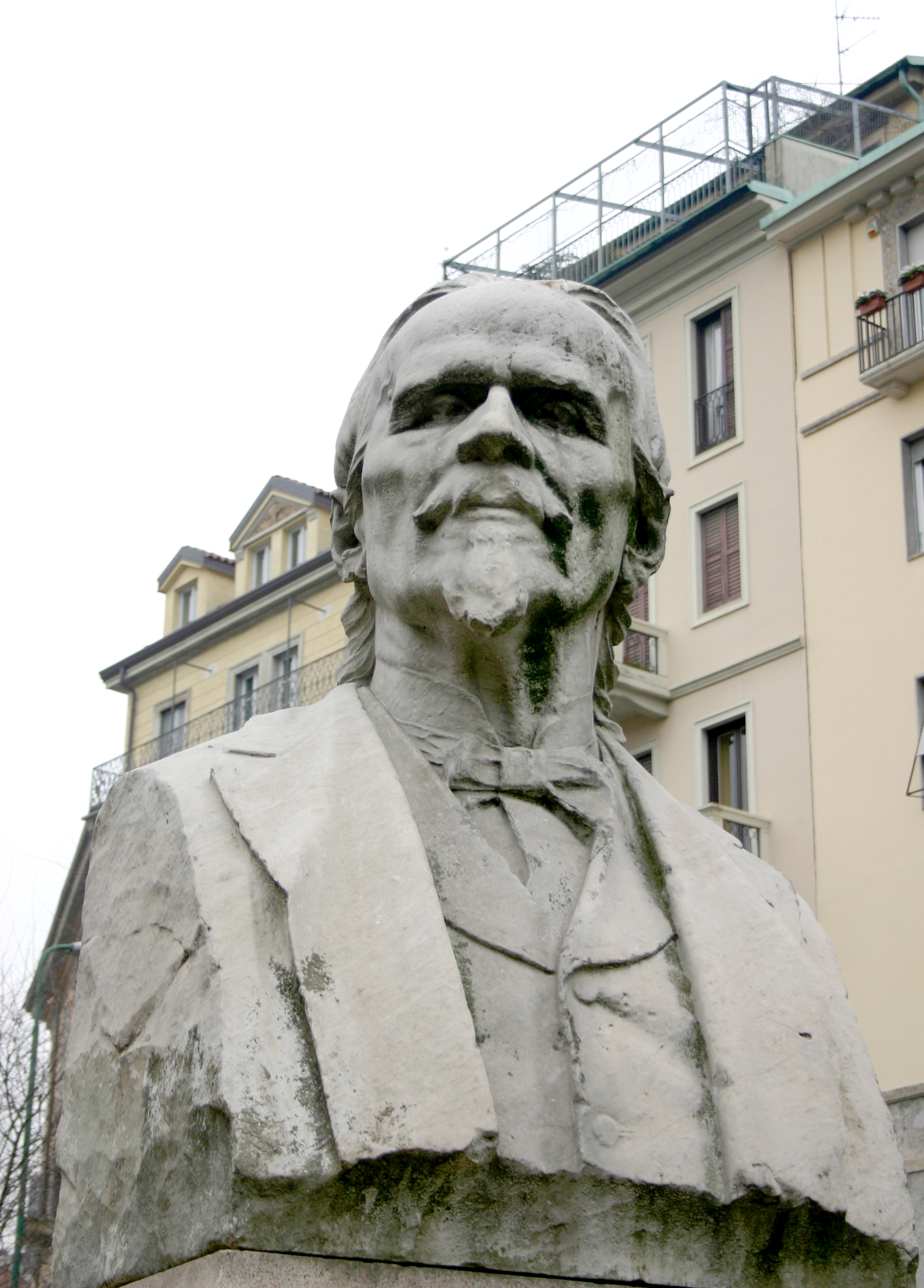
monument of Andrea Verga, in Milan

Andrea Verga (20 May 1811 – 21 November 1895) was an Italian psychiatrist and neurologist. Verga is remembered for his pioneer work done in the study of the criminally insane, as well as his early research of acrophobia, a condition he personally suffered from.

== Biography ==
=== Early life and education ===
Andrea Verga was born in Treviglio (Bergamo) on 30 May 1811, to a modest family. He was the second son of Domitilla Carcano and Giosuè Verga, who worked as a conveyor from Treviglio to Milan. As a child, he did not attend elementary school, but due to his mother's religious interest, he was initiated into ecclesiastical studies in the seminary. Consequently, he enrolled at the medical faculty of the University of Pavia, in November 1830. During the earliest years, he was attracted to lessons of the anatomy teacher Bartolomeo Panizza, of whom in 1836, after graduation, he became an assistant. In the same period, he participated with Giulio Carcano, Cesare Correnti, and other young patriots in the "Strenna Il Presagio", in which he published the short story La Fatua (1836). The love for poetry, the clear and flowing style, and the taste for the curious were characteristic traits of Verga. These stylistic features are remarkable also in his scientific writings, making him fully part of the Italian tradition of medical-literati. The years of assistantship in Pavia (1836–1842) were fundamental for him. Assisting Panizza deepened his knowledge about the study of human and pathological anatomy, physiology, comparative anatomy and experimental practice, devoting himself to the study of the nervous system. At the age of twenty-six, he went on an educational trip to German-speaking countries. He was also interested in Panizza's study of comparative anatomy, therefore between 1839 and 1841 he spent long periods of time in Comacchio, studying the reproduction of eels.

=== At the beginning of Andrea Verga’s professional career ===
In 1842, he moved to Milan, where he found employment in the private asylum Villa Antonini (hospice of San Celso), of which in 1847 he was promoted to "assistant director", then beginning his study of mental alienation. He also undertook the practice of general medicine, surgery, and anatomical exercises at the Ospedale Maggiore, collaborating with the new medical journal of Milan, founded by his friend Agostino Bertani and directed by Panizza. He participated in the congresses of Italian scientists. During the 1844 Milan convention, he participated in the Natural and civil news on the Lombardy of Carlo Cattaneo (whose second volume never came out). He wrote his beliefs about the Stabilimenti Pei Pazzi, a matter he previously discussed in the Gazzetta Medica of Milan with the title of Historical notes on the establishments of the madmen in Lombardy. While adhering to the ideals of the "Risorgimento", he did not take part in the Five Days of 1848 in the newly liberated Milan but was still appointed director of the public asylum of the Senavra by the provisional government. In 1849–1850, following the closure of the University of Pavia, he taught human anatomy in the newly created school of medicine, surgery, and pharmacy in the Ospedale Maggiore. In the following summer of 1850, he was sent by the same hospital to visit asylums in Switzerland and other European countries to study their organization and evaluate a reform of the Senavra. His experience as an asylum director convinced him more and more of the need to reorganize Italian asylums, transforming them into real tools for the treatment of insanity and into research and teaching centers for the nascent psychiatry, which still did not find space in universities.

=== Psychiatric appendix - Italian Archive ===
In 1852 he decided to enrich the Gazzetta Medica with a psychiatric appendix, which became the first Italian periodical expressly dedicated to this discipline. In this period he was appointed director of the Ospedale Maggiore, where he distinguished himself for the reforms of the medical-surgical service as a whole and for the promotion of anatomical-pathological studies.

In 1864, Verga then transformed the psychiatric appendix into an independent journal, the Italian Archive for nervous diseases and more particularly for mental insanities, directing it together with friends and colleagues Cesare Castiglioni and Serafino Biffi.

=== A new role in Andrea Verga's career ===
In 1865 he had to abandon his institutional work internal reorganization of the Ospedale Maggiore. However, a chair of the doctrine and clinic of mental alienation was established for him in the hospital. He managed to give lectures to doctors and psychiatric conferences open to the public. His fame as a teacher in the newborn medical branch of psychiatry had further approval with his new role as president of the Italian Freniary Society. An organization founded in Rome during the 11th Congress of Italian Scientists. He held the position until 1891, when he was replaced by Biffi and appointed honorary president. In 1874, at the Congress of the Society in Imola, the classification of mental illnesses proposed by him was approved, which made it possible to standardize the statistical surveys on the pathologies present in Italian asylums.

=== Political life ===
After having founded the Society of Patronage for the Mad Poor of the province of Milan in 1874, on 16 November 1876, he was appointed senator, on the proposal of his friend Correnti and with the support of Prime Minister Agostino Depretis. In Parliament, he undertook to support the bill on asylums and alienated persons and to vote in 1888 for the abolition of the death penalty. Present in many of the political, cultural, and scientific institutions of Milan Verga was for a long time provincial councilor (1867–1889), municipal councilor (1876–1889), member of the Municipal Health Commission (1882–1888), and in the matters of the Institute of Lombard of sciences, letters and arts, he was vice president from 1855 to 1857 and president in the years 1857–1858 and 1864–1865. During a visit to the asylum in Siena in 1886, he was injured by an inpatient in the left eye, causing the loss of his sight. Then when in 1892 the Italian Archive for Nervous Diseases merged into the Experimental Journal of Freniatria, founded in Reggio Emilia by Carlo Livi in 1875, Verga, now in his eighties, passed the baton to Livi's successor, Augusto Tamburini.

=== Last years of Andrea Verga’s life ===
In the last years of his life, he studied the physiology of old age and in 1895 founded a Relief Fund for poor alienists and their families. Andrea Verga died in Milan on 21 November 1895.

=== Correspondence with colleagues and friends (founded after death) ===
The correspondence with colleagues and friends is very rich, constituting a relevant testimony of the scientific and cultural environment of Milan in the second half of the nineteenth century. The correspondence also includes a significant number of letters addressed to Bartolomeo Panizza, and Natale Contini. Verga's correspondents include numerous doctors, psychiatrists, naturalists and exponents of the scientific world of the nineteenth century, such as Agostino Bertani, Leonardo Bianchi, Serafino Biffi, Alexandre Brierre de Boismont, Gabriele Buccola, Carlo Cantoni, Filippo De Filippi, Camillo Golgi, Carlo Livi, Cesare Lombroso, Paolo Mantegazza, Scipion Pinel, Augusto Tamburini, Augusto Tebaldi, Tito Vignoli. There are also numerous intellectuals, writers and politicians, including Vittoria Aganoor, Raffaello Barber, Luigi Bodio, Cesare Cantù, Giulio Carcano, Cesare Correnti, Andrea Maffei, Tullo Massarani. The archive also includes a substantial core consisting of medical and scientific writings: notes, observations, manuscripts, drafts and other printed material, which testify the path of studies, the period of the assistantship at the chair of anatomy of the Faculty of Medicine of the University of Pavia and the subsequent career of the alienist as a doctor and psychiatrist.

== The role of Verga in criminal asylum ==
Andrea Verga was one of the main character of the important discussion held in Aversa, 1877, where were listed the main questions for the past and present psychiatry.

1. There is a need for a criminal asylum in Italy? At the time the answer was "yes" but of course today it would be "no".
2. Is an happier denomination feasible? At the congress of Anversa was proposed the name "Health and safety asylum" but was than called "Manicomio Giudiziario" . Only in 1975 we arrived to the name O.P.G. ("Ospedale Psichiatrico Giudiziario").
3. What was the correct number of criminal asylum present in the territory? There wasn't a correct number but going on with time the number of asylum and beds in it started increasing rapidly.
4. What are the moral and material conditions of criminal asylum? This one was the question whose answer remained very vague: they knew the aim but not how to achieve it respecting morality.
5. What are the procedures for admission and discharge of patients from asylums? In Anversa was decided that the exit from the criminal asylum will be taken place on the basis of a judicial decision based on a medical advice.

== The Cholera map in the early 19th century ==
Before becoming a great psychiatrist, Andrea Verga had to face, as a recent graduate doctor, the first cholera epidemic that began to spread in Europe in 1830.The disease reached Italy in the summer of 1835, spreading rapidly through Piedmont to all the states into which the peninsula was still divided. The whole Bergamo area was very affected by the infections and he paid particular attention to the treatment of cholera in the nearby towns of Arzago and Casirate. He was infected, but managed to survive and a few years later to undertake the career that led him to become the "father of Italian psychiatry". The Verga archive contains various documents relating to cholera, such as this interesting map of the path that the epidemic made in the world from August 1817 to October 1830.

== Archive ==
Andrea Verga's archive is kept in the Civic Historical Collections of the Municipality of Milan, from which it was purchased in 1992 on the antiques market, after a long period of stay with the heirs. As noted by Marco Soresina, the Verga archive is the result of "successive stratifications": to the small group of papers written by Bartolomeo Panizza, many documentation has been added. Between 2004 and 2005, a partial reordering of the material and a consistency list was carried out by Paola Zocchi. In July 2015, the definitive reorganization and analytical inventorying intervention began, which is concluded in early March 2016. The whole documentary complex consists of the papers of the psychiatrist Andrea Verga, relating to both his professional activity and his private life. The archive also contains over a hundred medical records and some psychiatric reports, relating to cases of mental alienation followed by Verga himself. Papers also testify to his interest in literature and poetic composition: odes, songs, sonnets, satires, short stories and epistles in verse, fables in Italian, Latin and dialect. In the archive papers there is also ample evidence of the strong emotional bond with his hometown, Treviglio.

== Bibliography ==
- Paola Zocchi: Andrea Verga - Treccani Biographic Dictionary, March 29th 2020
- Massimo Aliverti: "La psichiatria italiana tra Ottocento e Novecento: dal manicomio al territorio", October 6, 2015, Imola pp. 183–190
- De Palma Ilaria: "Andrea Verga Archive" (1698–1908), 2015, Milane, pp. 4
- Paola Bianchi, Nadia Carrisi, Giorgio Sassi, Paola Zocchi: "Andrea Verga Archive" - Aspi (Archivio storico della psicologia italiana), March 30th 2016
- Bill Long: "The Development of "Fear" Terminology" (paragraph 6, "Acrophobia"), February 16th 2007
- V.P. Babini: "Tra sapere e potere. La psichiatria italiana nella seconda metà dell’Ottocento", 1982, Bologna
- P. Zocchi: "L’antico museo anatomico dell’ospedale Maggiore di Milano", 2005, Milano, pp. 30–50
- Luigi Agostino Casati, Domenico Farini: "Parliamentary acts - in commemoration to Andrea Verga" (Italian Republican Senate site), November 22nd 1895, Rome
- P. Zocchi: "Medicina e Risorgimento nel carteggio tra Andrea Verga(1811-1895) e Agostino Bertani (1812-1886), 2017, Milano
- Wikipedia Archive
- Bruno Civello, Luciano Cupelli, Carmine Marinucci, Ida Mercuri, Istituto e Museo di Storia della Scienza: "Mille Anni di Scienza in Italia", 2001, Rome - MURST
- OCLC WorldCat identities: "Andrea Verga publication timeline", 2021
- Aspi, Bicocca-Milan University, Historical collections Palazzo Moriggia: Andrea Verga Archive, Milan
