= Giovanni Visconti Venosta =

Giovanni "Gino" Visconti Venosta
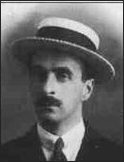
- Born: 4 September 1831; Milan, Lombardy
- Died: 1 October 1906 (aged 75); Milan, Lombardy, Italy
- Occupations: Patriot activist (Risorgimento); Writer; Politician
- Spouse: Laura d'Adda Salvaterra Scaccabarozzi

Giovanni "Gino" Visconti Venosta (4 September 1831 – 1 October 1906) was a Milanese writer-scholar and, as a young man, an activist Italian patriot (a partisan for Italian unification).

== Life ==
=== Family provenance ===
Giovanni Visconti Venosta came from an aristocratic family originally from Grosio in the Valtellina, in the Alpine countryside north of Milan. His grandfather, Nicola (1752-1828), had relocated to Tirano and his father, Francesco, had moved to Milan in 1823 where he married Paola Borgazzi (died 1864). His eldest surviving brother, Emilio, who became a statesman and diplomat, was born in 1829, two and a half years before Gino. (The first born of the brothers, Nicolo, died in infancy.)

The children grew up in Milan, but each summer they went to stay at family homes at Grosio and Tirano. At this time the entire region had been under Austrian control since 1815, although the Austrian presence was increasingly resented as a foreign occupation. During the summer of 1846, after a trip to Poschiavo, their father, Francesco, died suddenly, at the age of just 48. Responsibility for bringing up his sons now passed to Cesare Correnti, a politician who backed Italian unification. The Venosta brothers were educated at the Istituto Boselli in Milan, but they were educated in politics at Correnti's house. It was here that Gino encountered the writings of Giovanni Berchet and Giuseppe Mazzini, two writers whose enthusiastic support for the unification cause leads them to be identified in contemporary sources as Italian Patriots. Both Gino and Emilio became enthusiasts for the nationalist cause embodied in the writings of Mazzini.

=== 1847/48 ===
On 4 September 1847 Archbishop Romilli, newly installed to the diocese of Milan, made his solemn entry into the city. The fact that his post had gone to an Italian - after twenty eight years under the Austrian archbishop, Cardinal Gaisruck - generated much enthusiasm among the people, and this was inflamed by the pronouncement of the new pope, Pius IX, endorsing nationalist aspirations for a unified Italy. In Milan the Austrian authorities attempted to contain the celebrations, and the following evening there was a violent confrontation which resulted in a death.

On 5 September, a Saturday and the last day of the summer term, Giovanni went directly to the out of town family home at Tirano after school. A few days later there was a visit from Cesare Correnti and the patriot doctor, Romolo Griffini who briefed him on the disturbances in the city at the end of the previous week. Together they discussed a way ahead. In this way, Giovanni, who was still a teenager, went with the others to the village of Stelvio where they were able to update the alpine farming community on the situation, and where it is known that Giovanni took time out to scrawl on a wall "Viva l'Italia, viva Pio IX" ("Long live [a united] Italy, long live Pius IX").

1848 in Italy is remembered for a more general and widespread outburst of revolutionary protest in support of liberal nationalism. Giovanni was still too young to participate as actively as his brother Emilio in the March uprising on the streets of Milan, but his emotional commitment was total, as was his joy at seeing the revolutionary flag fluttering from the spire of the cathedral. It was not all joy, however. Many Milanese families, among them the Visconti Venosta, were forced out of their homes, which were commandeered to accommodate Austrian troops. The family found shelter with a Signora Garnier who ran a girls' boarding school.

A provisional regional government was established in Milan: Corrento, as one of the leading protesters, was a member of it. After the victory (from the "patriotic" perspective) at Goito and the capture of Peschiera, the tide appeared to turn in favour of the conservatives, however: the King of Naples fought back successfully against the liberal forces in the south of the Italian peninsular, and declared himself in support of continued Austrian dominance in the north. Papal troops fell back, and Vicenza, where the uprising against the Austrians had been more effective than in most places, was recaptured by the Austrians. The insurgents' initial victory was crumbling. With the return of a reinforced Austrian force imminent, the leading families of Milan fled, seeking refuge in Switzerland. While his elder brother, Emilio, had gone to Bergamo where he joined the Garibaldini militia, Giovanni escaped with the rest of his family to Bellinzona.

=== Aftermath of a failed revolution ===
The perceived defeat of liberal nationalism in 1848 engendered, among the Milanese political exiles in Switzerland, a wider diffusion of the ideas of Mazzini and admiration for the patriotic exploits of Garibaldi. During the summer of 1848 Giovanni often visited his brother, stationed in Lugano, and on several occasions he even saw Mazzini himself. In October the family, including Giovanni, returned to Milan, a city now overflowing with Croatian soldiers (installed by the Austrians). When he went to the family's countryside home at Tirano, he found the situation was much same. That winter he returned to Milan, and embarked on a decade of participation in resistance to the Austrian occupation.

After a general period of discouragement, there was a coming together of intellectuals that included the university of Pavia where Giovanni was by now enrolled. In 1850 Giovanni was admitted for the first time to the celebrated "salon" of Clara Maffei, the Salotto Maffei. He became almost a daily visitor - following his brother's lead - to Clara's "salon", developing what became a lifelong friendship. Discussion in the salon increasingly favoured a monarchist future for a united Italy, and there was a growing awareness of the potential importance of Piedmont under the hard headed administration of Cavour. Outside the Maffei Salon, where he had also been able to get to know Alessandro Manzoni, Giovanni also became a visitor to the house of Carmelita Fé Manara (the widow of Luciano Manara), where comic parodies were presented using marionettes. Parodies composed by Giovanni were deemed too unsubtle, however, and came to be excluded from the programmes. The best known of his parodies was "The Crusader's Departure" ("La partenza del Crociato"), written at Tirano in 1856. It served to disseminate the new ideas from the liberal institutions among the quasi-military volunteer fire-fighters set up in the Valtellina by Giovanni Visconti Venosta (who also acted as an instructor) and by his friend, the mayor of Tirano, Giovanni Salis in 1854. During the 1850s the Visconti Venosta brothers also did a lot of travelling, visiting all parts of Italy, along with Paris.

=== Wanted man ===
In the salons of Milan he met Laura d'Adda Salvaterra Scaccabarozzi who was at this stage married. Some years later, after she had become a widow, the two of them married one another. In 1859, following the funeral of Emilio Dandolo the Visconti-Venosta brothers fell under suspicion and took refuge in Piedmont. The manner of their departures differed. Warned by Rosa Bargnani that they were being sought by the authorities, Emiolio headed out of the city without delay, Giovanni decided to stay behind and wait for the delivery of signed emigration authorisations from nearby Brescia. His house was the subject of a police raid in the night, however. Giovanni fled through a side door and ran for help. His first thought was to go to Costantino Garavaglia, but it turned out he had just been arrested. He fared no better at Carcano's house. He then got hold of Clara Maffei who immediately contacted Carlo Tenca who realised that Visconti Venosta had escaped from his house without taking any money. A few meters further on he reached the house of di Laura d'Adda Salvaterra Scaccabarozzi who was able to provide him with some cash, after which Tenco accompanied the fugitive to beyond the city limits. The most adventurous part of his escape from the territories controlled by the Austrians was the final stretch. Arriving at the frontier, here defined by the Ticino river he came across, by chance, a friend and fellow patriot who knew the local frontier commissioner. There was a project under discussion at the time to extend the local (horse drawn) railway line to the west from Tornavento. Giovanni and his friend had the idea to offer to survey a piece of land that could be used for the line extension. After promising the commissioner to put in a good word for his son, Giovanni obtained the man's permission to undertake a reconnaissance on the far side of the river: he duly crossed, which took him into Piedmont, outside the territory controlled by the Austrians.

=== Piedmontese exile and Italian Lombardy ===
Once the brothers were in Turin, Giovanni re-established contact with Cesare Correnti, who had already been living as an exile there for some time. He also had the honour to meet with Garibaldi and Cavour, who appointed him as a member of a Consultative Commission on Lombardy, on which Giovanni went on to serve as commission secretary.

The Visconti Venosta brothers arrived in Turin shortly before the outbreak of the Second Italian War of Independence which involved the annexation of Lombardy to Piedmont by a combined Franco-Piedmontese army (on the flat lands to the south) and a patriotic force under Garibaldi (in the mountains to the north). Just a few months after his flight to Piedmont, Giovanni therefore returned to the Valtellina, now as a Royal Commissioner. He quickly acquired a reputation as a natural diplomat, mediating between the Piedmontese political leader, Cavour, and the revolutionary hero originally from southern Italy, Garibaldi. After the Armistice of Villafranca (11 July 1859), Giovanni left the Valtellina and headed for Milan, where the celebrations were in full flow. A highlight, on 16 February 1660, was the solemn entry to the city of the new King of Italy, followed by his remarkable "prime minister", Count Cavour.

=== The new establishment ===
With Italian unification a done deal (at least regarding Lombardy), Giovanni Visconti Venosta found himself in the novel position of being a supporter of the status quo. A brief political career followed. In 1865 he was elected to the new Italian parliament, representing a Milan electoral district, but he served only for one term, after which he was content to leave politics to his brother. He nevertheless held a long succession of positions in public administration, including President of the Constitutional Association, President of the Risorgimento Museum, Vice president of the Telephone Company of Northern Italy and President of the Support Commission for Venetian Emigrants. He was also a co-founder of the daily newspaper, La Perseveranza.

The marriage with the widow Laura d'Adda Salvaterra Scaccabarozzi was a loving one, albeit childless. It ended with Laura's death in 1904 while Giovanni was republishing memoires of his youth, a project in which Laura had collaborated closely. Two years later, on 1 October 1906, Giovanni Visconti Venosta died at Milan after a short illness. The funeral was a large one held in Milan, but his body was interred in the family tomb at Grosio.
