= Romolo Griffini =

- Romolo Griffini ca.1885
- Born: 26 May 1825; Milan, Lombardy–Venetia, Austrian Empire
- Died: 9 January 1888 (aged 62); Milan, Italy
- Occupations: patriot-activist physician
- Parent(s): Domenico Griffini; Giovanna Vago

Romolo Griffini (26 May 1825 – 9 January 1888) was a Milanese medical doctor, social reformer and patriot-activist. He was also, at various stages in his career, a newspaper journalist-editor

Patriotic aspirations, in the context of the time and place, involved the Risorgimento goals of removing the Austrian military occupation from northern Italy and creating a political union in the region south of the Alps which might present a politically progressive and militarily more formidable counter-weight to the imperial ambitions of Austria and France.

== Life ==
=== Provenance and early years ===
Romolo Griffini was born in Milan, in the fashionable (then as now) central district of the Via Monte Napoleone. He was one of the four recorded sons of Dr. Domenico Griffini by his marriage to Giovanna Vago. He grew up in Milan, at a young age becoming part of the circle of aristocratic and haut-bourgeois youths that formed a group around Cesare Correnti. He was one of those, together with Emilio Visconti Venosta and Antonio Colombo who in December 1847 got together, under Correnti's leadership, to produce the "Nipote del Vesta Verde", an "almanac" promoting the patriotic vision. Targeted at a mass audience, the almanac dealt with popular issues such as Kindergartens for infants and mutual aid societies, but it also featured economic debate, and it did not hesitate to give advice on hygiene, a topic which presumably was championed by Griffini, the medical student in the production team. It is a mark of the almanac's success popularity that it became an annual publication, the final edition being that for 1859.

=== 1848 ===
The revolutionary tide of 1848 reached Milan on 18 March 1848 when a popular rebellion (underpinned by the threat of military intervention from Piedmont) forced the Austrian forces under Field Marshal Radetzy to stage a strategic withdrawal from the city, where a "provisional government" (destined to last for around four months) was established. At the time when the rebellion broke out Griffini was a few weeks short of completing his university medical studies, but now he felt obliged to abandon these in order to participate in the revolt. The expulsion of the Austrians meant an end to censorship and unleashed a proliferation of leaflets, pamphlets and newspapers. Griffini teamed up with Pietro Maestri to launch "Voce del popolo" ("Voice of the people"), a daily tabloid-sized newspaper published in Milan between 26 March and 29 July 1848, with a cover price of 5 centesimi. Another contributor was Gaetano Zuccoli. The "Voce" was aimed at a mass audience but represented an interesting experiment in Lombard journalism, and a test of the skills of its two young editors. It was, of course, unflinching in its backing for republicanism and democracy, but it was nevertheless non-confrontational in its attitude to the provisional government, accepting that the detailed nature of future political institutions could only be determined once the war was over, but without yielding in its "people's war" supportive attitude to the national guard, constitutional principals and universal suffrage. The relatively conciliatory spirit in respect of moderate-liberal opinion was summed up in a strikingly "constructive mission statement" printed and signed by the two editors on 26 March 1848: "Our political approach, for now, is to be helpful, supportive and obedient to the provisional government" ("Il nostro motto politico è, per ora, aiuto, soccorso, obbedienza al Governo provvisorio").

On 12 May 1848 the provisional government issued a decree providing for an immediate plebiscite to endorse the annexation of Lombardy by the Kingdom of Sardinia. Many at the republican end of the political spectrum saw this as a betrayal of the Milanese uprising and "Voce" now became a harsh critic of the government, denouncing the "collapse of government policy" and a plebiscite proposal which let down those who had placed their trust in the government. Griffini and Maestri were among those who signed a protest condemning the plebiscite decree of 12 May, along with Giuseppe Mazzini, Giuseppe Sirtori and Carlo Tenca. During July 1848 battlefield reverses suffered by the Piedmontese left Milan open to the return of Radetzky's Austrian army. As the "ending of Milanese liberty", drew near, Romolo Griffini became secretary to the hastily convened "defence committee", which comprised Manfredo Fanti, Pietro Maestri and Francesco Restelli. A few days before the Austrian army came back, publication of "Voce del popolo" was suspended on 29 July 1848.

=== Flight and return ===
Griffini fled Milan on 6 August, thus narrowly avoiding the return of the Austrians. He headed for Lugano, from where he moved on to Zürich and then Genoa. By around the end of the year he had moved on again, this time to Florence where he was present for the "peaceful revolution of 1849" which involved the (temporary) deposition of the Grand Duke of Tuscay. In Florence he worked on the republican newspaper "La Costituente italiana" (loosely "The Italian parliament"), which was produced by Antonio Mordini and L.Biscardi between 23 December 1848 and 30 March 1849. The principal objective of this publication was to promote a rapid union between the short-lived Tuscan Republic and the Roman Republic, the resulting entity to be governed through a parliament elected by universal suffrage.

There would be no merger between Tuscany and Rome in 1849, and no parliament elected by universal suffrage; but the ideas lived on. During the first half of 1849 the revolutions fizzled out. Pausing only to conclude his medical studies and obtain his degree at Pisa, Griffini returned home to Milan. His Pisa degree turned out to be invalid in what had reverted to being the Austrian controlled Kingdom of Lombardy–Venetia, however, and in September 1849 he obtained a second degree, at Pavia. This involved producing a dissertation on epilepsy which was highly commended by the professors involved, and published.

=== Middle years ===
Shortly after that Griffini obtained a post as a medical surgeon at Milan's main hospital, which became the launching pad for a distinguished medical career. In 1850 he became an assistant at the Eye clinic. In 1853–54 he was head of the Petechia department and in 1855 he became director of the associated department treating cholera patients. He became a senior doctor at the main hospital at the start of 1856.

Along with his medical work, in 1856 he took over from "Carl'Ampellio Calderini" as director of the "Annali universali di medicina", a monthly medical publication: he would retain this directorship till 1874. Nor did Griffini ever lose his political commitment. He was a frequent visitor at the Salotto Maffei, a salon hosted by the Contessa Maffei, and a favourite meeting place for literati, artists, scholars and composers where it was not unknown for the conversation to turn to politics. He was a co-founder of "Crepusculo" (literally: Dusk), a publication which helped to keep the flag of patriotism alive in Lombardy during the long run up to 1859, and to which he regularly contributed articles on medical and social issues. He also used "Crepusculo" to launch an initiative to address the pressing issue of abandoned infants, calling for the creation of shelters for infants in order to keep them in families and remove any criminal propensity to infanticide (per "conservare i bambini nelle famiglie e togliere ogni spinta criminosa agli infanticidi"). Others involved with the publication included Carlo Tenca, Emilio Visconti Venosta, Tullo Massarani, Antonio Allievi, Giuseppe Zanardelli and Gabriele Rosa.

=== Italy ===
During the war of 1859 Griffine served as director and head physician at the Military Hospital of San Luca. After it was over, the valour he had demonstrated led to his being awarded the Legion of Honour and promoted to the rank of "Surgeon Major" in the National Guard. Also in 1859, directly after the war, he was elected to the municipal councillor. Meanwhile, in 1862 he was a co-founder of the Italian Medical Association, and in his capacity as president of the Medical Committee of Milan he served on a number of commissions concerning the laws on health and hygiene, and the reorganisation at the national level of medical training. In 1862 he was a member of the hospital commission mandated to study nosocomial gangrene and suggest solutions for it. He worked on projects to study the establishment of district asylums, and in 1864, as the councillor responsible, was given the task of drafting a new regulation on the subject.

Most significantly, Griffini became a member of the committee overseeing the orphanages and was then appointed regional director for orphanages, a post that he held from 1866 till 1885. The subject was one on which he had already expressed his views powerfully in the press even before reunification. Following reunification, responsibility for addressing the orphanages issue had passed to the city council. Concerns surrounding new-born babies abandoned at the "wheel" outside the city orphanage had been high on the public agenda for decades, not just in Milan, but across catholic northern Italy. There was a perception that the number of infants abandoned was increasing uncontrollably. The tradition whereby new-born infants could be left anonymously at the "wheel" in order to spare the mothers of illegitimate infants the trauma of stigma and social ostracism was being abused, according to Griffini: others agreed. For Griffini, many of the abandoned infants were left simply because their mothers – even where respectably married – were poor, and believed their children would be better provided for by the orphanage. For Griffini, a better solution would be to persuade the mothers of legitimate infants to keep their children within their own families, even where doing so might require some level of financial support from the authorities. Griffini saw to the removal of the "wheel" outside the Milan city orphanage on 1 July 1868, but that was to some extent symbolic of a more wide-ranging reform to regulate the orphanage and public policy on pregnancy. Each orphanage should have an acceptance office to ascertain the reason for each infant abandonment and to provide cash for parents deemed appropriately needy. Regulations were introduced to try and address the conflicting outcomes resulting from the activities of charitable institutions dealing with the sensitive issues involved. By the time came for the implementation of many of his reforms Griffini was on the brink of retirement, but the matter was taken forward under the more than competent leadership of the advisor to the "Hospitals Institute", the obstetrician Edoardo Porro.

=== Final years ===
Poor health forced Griffini to retire in 1884. He withdrew to Varese where he lived in relative seclusion. He remained in contact with his orphanages project, however, continuing to work on detailed proposals and urging, in his letters, that the foundlings and their poor mothers should not be forgotten.

Rudolfo Griffini died at Varese at the start of 1888. His body was returned to Milan for burial in the "Monumental Cemetery".
