= Pietro Maestri =

Italian risorgimento-patriot

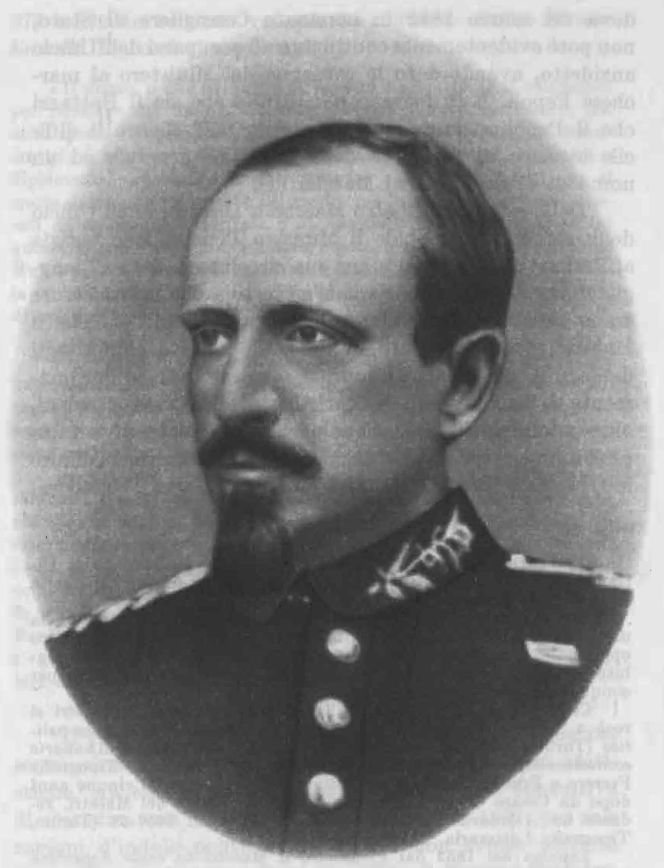
- Born: 28 February 1816; Milan, Kingdom of Lombardy–Venetia
- Died: 4 July 1871 (aged 55); Florence, Tuscany, Italy
- Education: University of Padua
- Occupations: Physician risorgimento-activist Political and economicommentator Government chief statistician
- Parents: Antonio Maestri (father); Rachele Magistrelli (mother)

Pietro Maestri (28 February 1816 – 4 July 1871) was an Italian risorgimento-patriot. Although he trained as a physician, he is better remembered for his activism in support of a democratic and liberated Italy, as well as for his subsequent career as an economist-statistician. He inherited a passion for statistics from his father, and worked for the government after 1861 as Director of the National Statistical Council (la "Giunta centrale di statistica"). He was something of a pioneer in the field of government statistics and probability theory, although for Maestri Statistics were very much a device of politics and national economics. It would be left to his successor in the post, Luigi Bodio, to demonstrate the extent to which, during a time of rapid social and economic change, government statistics could become a tool to build understanding of social facts and developments.

== Biography ==
=== Provenance and early years ===
Pietro Maestri was born and grew up in Milan. Antonio Maestri, his father, became a vice-president and the Central Government Accounting Office for Lombardo-Veneto, where he worked between 1801 and 1848. Although he inherited a love of statistical studies from his father, when it came to his university choices Pietro Maestri enrolled in 1835 at the Medical Faculty of the University of Padua where he studied Medicine, graduating in 1841. As a student he began to engage clandestinely in politics. belonging to what he later described as a "secret society of democratic students". They engaged in competitive political discussion at lengthy secret meetings, and also gathered little collections of "politically subversive" books and journals which they shared around.

Following his graduation he took a post as a medical assistant at a Milan hospital. Starting in 1843 he also became a contributor to "Gazzetta medica di Milano", a newly-founded journal produced by his student near-contemporary Agostino Bertani. The two of them shared a passion for medicine, strongly oriented towards contextualisation within a social plan. They also shared, on the political front, a youthful dedication to the cause of democratic-republicanism. As inhabitants of a puppet state taking its orders from Vienna, this made them, by definition, opponents of the political status quo. An important - and particularly lengthy - article that Maestri contributed to "Gazzetta medica di Milano" focused on various aspects of the need for reform of the criminal justice system. Maestri's views on the issues came to wider attention and triggered a lively debate that drew in, among others, the young economist-activist Carlo Cattaneo and the distinguished aristocrat-economist Carlo Ilarione Petitti di Roreto.

=== Travels and observations ===
In 1845, wishing to complete his education, Maestri undertook a lengthy visit to Paris and London. He met up with Giuseppe Mazzini, who had been exiled in London, living in conditions of some material hardship, since 1837, following the failure of uprisings against Austrian hegemony earlier in the 1830s. Mazzini became a prodigious and inspiring author during his time in England, and by the time Maestri met him in London he was an iconic figure among young Italian men committed to the causes of what was known as "patriotism" and impatient for revolution. Maestri later reported that he had been favourably impressed by Mazzini, whom he thought a "giovine eccellente" ("excellent young man"). He nevertheless later claimed to have identified a risk, even in 1845, that Mazzini might succumb to "the usual tendency of [brilliant men], and substitute thoughts based on theory for the need for [simple] insurrectionary action".

Back home in Milan, Maestri contributed to "Gazzetta medica di Milano" a lively set of "Reminiscences on the trip by a hypochondriac doctor to Paris and London". Based on his experiences he included some trenchant observations on the causes of industrial crises which are contextualised as much in terms of socio-economic philosophy as of medicine. His time in Paris and London had evidently forced him to confront the "true nature of factory work". Industry, he had concluded, "gathers together those accustomed to squalor and hunger, and measures their output as though they were industrial steam engines. More and more products are produced. The more the factory workers produce, the more they have to produce, until one day you reach the point where there is no one left to buy what is produced. The market is glutted. The doors of the factory are inexorably closed. Industry has created a population of production workers which is now transmuted into a population of proletarians". (Note: L'industria "...raccoglie le popolazioni squallide ed affamate, e ne misura il lavoro coi moti della vaporiera; i prodotti si accumulano sui prodotti; più si crea e più è forza creare, finché un giorno non vi sia più chi compri - il mercato è colmo. Allora le porte dell'officina si chiudono inesorabilmente ...... L'industria aveva creato una popolazione di operai e ora li trasmuta in una popolazione di proletarii".)

=== Networking ===
In September 1846 Dr. Pietro Maestri attended the 8th Congress of Italian Scientists which was held, that year, at Genoa. He is identified in the participants' listing as a "surgeon at the Milan Sanatorium" ("...medico chirurgo presso la casa de salute di della citta Milano").

=== 1848 ===
In 1848 Maestri participated in the March insurrection, joining up with his friend Bertani to organise an improvised ambulance service. The expulsion of the Austrian troops meant an end to censorship and unleashed a proliferation of leaflets, pamphlets and newspapers. Maestri teamed up with Romolo Griffini to launch "Voce del popolo" ("Voice of the people"), a daily tabloid-sized newspaper published in Milan between 26 March and 29 July 1848, with a cover price of 5 centesimi. The newspaper was unusual, even among democratic-republican publications of the time, in the extent to which it demonstrated a concern with social problems. The "Voce" was aimed at a mass audience but represented an interesting experiment in Lombard journalism, and a test of the skills of its two young editorial-controllers. It was, of course, unflinching in its backing for republicanism and democracy, but it was nevertheless non-confrontational in its attitude to the provisional government in Milan, accepting that the detailed nature of future political institutions could only be determined once the war was over, but without yielding in its "people's war" supportive attitude to the national guard, constitutional principles and universal suffrage. The relatively conciliatory spirit in respect of moderate-liberal opinion was summed up in a strikingly "constructive mission statement" printed and signed by the two editors on 26 March 1848: "Our political approach, for now, is to be helpful, supportive and obedient to the provisional government" ("Il nostro motto politico è, per ora, aiuto, soccorso, obbedienza al Governo provvisorio"). At least one source reports that Maestri fought valiantly as an insurrectionist. After Field Marshal Radesky returned with a much larger army and reimposed Austrian control Pietro Maestri was imprisoned in the Castello Sforzesco, the large fortress in the city centre from where, traditionally, the city was garrisoned by the Imperial army. He nevertheless escaped death.

Towards the final part of Milan's summer of independence, on 7 July 1848, Maestri was summoned to become a member of the "Extraordinary Central Committee for arming the national guard (Note: "Comitato centrale straordinario per l'armamento della guardia nazionale".) In 28 July 1848 Pietro Maestri, together with Francesco Restelli and Manfredo Fanti, joined the "Committee of Public Safety" which struggled in vain to organise resistance against the Austrian army, now greatly reinforced recently victorious against Charles Albert of Sardinia at Custoza.

Through the preceding four months Maestri had vented an implacably republican opposition to any merger of Lombardo-Veneto into the neighbouring Kingdom of Sardinia-Piedmont (which had emerged from the Napoleon nightmare with its autonomy formally intact). Nevertheless, in the 60 page booklet he produced with Francesco Restelli on 15 August 1848, providing a factual but emotionally charged account of the sad events that marked an end to Milan's summer of independence, Maestri was bitterly critical of King Charles Albert of Sardinia, accusing the Sardinian leader of "treachery", on account of the Sardinian army's failure to resist the Austrian recapture of Milan more effectively.

=== The fight continues ===
Although Milan came back under Austrian control in the high summer of 1848, many other territories hitherto inside the Austrian sphere of influence on the Italian peninsula retained their liberties for many more months. It was not till August 1849 that the Venice region following a long siege, a famine and a destructive cholera epidemic, came back under Austrian control. As Milan capitulated in July/August 1848, Pietro Maestri and Giuseppe Mazzini escaped to Genoa and then made their way back inland to Lugano. Almost immediately Maestri moved on again, this time to Venice, where he arrived on 13 September 1848 in order to organise the republican forces there on behalf of Mazzini. Subsequently he moved on the Florence and from there to Rome. In Florence between November 1838 and January 1849 he was a leading promoter of the Provisional Central Committee created as a precursor to a National Constituent Assembly in Rome where, during the early months of 1849, he was one of the most prominent supporters of that development.

Back in Turin, in January 1849 Maestri stood for election to the short-lived Second Legislature of the Kingdom of Sardinia. His rival for the votes of the electors in the Borgomanero electoral district was the Abbot Antonio Rosmini. Maestri secured a majority of the votes cast, but not an overall majority of the votes of those entitled to vote, but then on 3 February 1849 his election was annulled on the grounds that fewer than a third of those entitled to vote had actually done so. (Note: Of 607 entitled to vote in the Borgomanero electoral district in the first ballot for election of January 1849 only 198 did so. Under most circumstances the election would have progressed to a second "run-off" ballot whereby it would have been mathematically impossible for one or other of the candidates not to win an overall majority of votes cast, but it was determined that the low level of turn-out for the first ballot meant that there should be no second ballot.) Following the proclamation of the Roman Republic during February 1849, Maestri was at once sent back to Florence to campaign for a unification of the Roman Republic with Tuscany where the return of the Grand Duke and his Austrian backers appeared imminent, while power was still shared in the meantime through an informal and unstable understanding between street politicians and a three man "provisional republican government". The idea of a merger between the Roman Republic and Tuscany, which would have further antagonised Austria, failed to gain significant traction with the most powerful member of the governing trio, Francesco Domenico Guerrazzi, who at the end of March 1849 had his role within the triumvirate strengthened when he accepted the title of "dictator", apparently with the support of the French government, which viewed the continuing political crisis on the Italian peninsula with intensifying concern. Returning again to Rome, Maestri participated in that city against the French who, following recent régime change in Paris, intervened by landing an army at Civitavecchia - the sea port for Rome - on 25 April 1949. After Rome was surrendered to the French at the start of July 1849, and with the Grand Duke returned to power in Florence through the threat of an imminent Austrian invasion at the end of the same month, In Milan, with the Austrians firmly back in control, the so-called "Radesky Proclamation", issued on 12 August 1849, included a lengthy listing of Milanese who would not be able to return home "because of their unjustifiable perseverance in support of revolution and their subversive tendencies". (Note: "...per la loro ingiustificabile perseveranza nelle mene rivoluzionarie e per le sovvertitrici loro tendenze".) Pietro Maestri was back on the run.

=== Political exile ===
He made his way to Genoa, and from there, in February 1850, to Susa, on the eastern Piedmont side of the mountain pass leading towards Chambéry and, beyond Savoy, France. In April 1850 Maestri moved on again, this time settling in Turin, the capital of Piedmont-Sardinia. (Piedmont-Sardinia remained a resolutely - if sometimes also uneasily - independent kingdom, sandwiched in the mountains between France and the Austrian empire.) The failure of the Milanese uprising of 1848 to trigger the transformation of most or all of the Italian peninsula into an independent republic dedicated to the ideals of liberalism and democracy was a defining disappointment to the patriot generation of 1848: the two and a half years that followed, exiled in Turin, provided an opportunity to take stock. For Pietro Maestri this brought about a lasting falling out with Giuseppe Mazzini. He moved instead to join up with a group of federalist dissident fellow veterans of the fighting in 1848/49 around Enrico Cernuschi, also including Giuseppe Ferrari. Convinced that a successful launch of Italian democracy should and would need to be based on socialist principals of the time, the men now accused Mazzini, Maestri's former mentor, of what they termed "formalismo", because they thought it had become clear that the Mazzinian vision for Italy totally ignored the social dimension. Of particular significance during this period was a thoughtful contribution that Maestro produced for the 1851 edition of the Turin "Annuario economico-politico" (loosely, "Economic-Political Yearbook") which signals the start of Maestri's development, during the later 1850s, from political activist and street fighter to student of the re-emerging discipline of Statistics and influential politic-economic commentator. It also bears testimony to the way in which by this time he had become one of many on the political left on western Europe whose thinking had been heavily influenced by the proto-socialist writings of Pierre-Joseph Proudhon.

Having become politically and personally distanced from Mazzini since 1849, Maestri was not involved in the insurrectionary preparations of the brief and in itself inconsequential February 6 revolt that troubled the authorities in Milan in 1853. It was presumably as part of an enduring legacy in the insurgencies of 1848/49 that he was nevertheless one of those who found themselves send into exile by a nervous Piedmontese government under its recently installed head of government, Count Cavour. Required to leave Turin, Maestri initially made his way to Switzerland, and then moved on in 1854 to Paris, where he would continue to make his home for the better part of a decade.

=== Paris ===
Although there is mention of his having worked as a physician, in terms of his public footprint the focus of Maestri's life in Paris was on his engagement as a student-scholar of Statistics and on his associated journalistic output. One of his channels was the "Revue franco-italienne", a literary journal founded by the exiled Sicilian risorgimento-activist, Giacinto Carini in November 1854. His contributions bear testimony to his growing fascination with the application of statistical method to economic questions. The "Italian Statistical Yearbook 1857-58" ("Annuario statistico italiano del 1857-58") which he produced jointly with Cesare Correnti pointed in the same direction. (A second volume would appear in 1864.) A prescient theme is Maestri's passionate advocacy of an Italian economic union: "A common market would be a real dynamometer for Italian industry ... teaching each part of Italy what it is able to do best, without wasting vital resources sustaining activities more efficiently performed elsewhere and abroad". (Note: "Un mercato comune - scriveva - sarebbe il vero dinamometro delle industrie italiane, il quale porrebbe le cose a luogo e insegnerebbe a ciascuna parte d'Italia a far quello che è più acconcia a fare e non disperdere in inutili e minute gare e in infelici ripetizioni le forze necessarie per sostenere la lotta con l'industria transalpina e transmarina".)

While in Paris, Maestri became a regular contributor to the Journal des économistes, an economic review magazine committed to liberalism and free trade. In addition to trying to explain Italy to the French, he also committed himself to reporting the events in France to his compatriots on the south side of Mont Blanc. Of particular significance, in this connection, is a series of articles he wrote under the series title "La Francia contemporanea" ("France Today") for Cattaneo's review journal, "Politecnico" after the 1859 war.

=== More war ===
In April 1859 war returned. Maestri enlisted as a doctor-surgeon with Garibaldi's "Cacciatori delle Alpi" brigade, a proto-partisan operation created to support the Sardinian-Pietmontese army in the struggle to liberate Northern Italy. He also did valuable work as an intermediary between Agostino Bertani, chief medical officer of the "Cacciatori delle Alpi" and Count Cavour (who was in effect serving as his own Minister for War in the government that he led in Turin). The purpose of Maestri's diplomacy was to ensure that the volunteer army doctors who were supporting the anti-Austrian struggle were fairly allocated between the "Royal Sardinian Army" and the "Cacciatori delle Alpi". Neither Cavour nor Garibaldi would have dared take on the army of the armies of the Austrian Empire without the military and diplomatic muscle provided by French support. The French dictator loved to take his allies and enemies by surprise, and when he unexpectedly concluded an armistice with the Austrian emperor on 11 July 1859 it meant, to the bitter disappointment of Garibaldi, Cavour and their supporters, that the fighting was over. It was time for diplomacy. Long before November 1859, when the Treaty of Zürich was concluded, it had become obvious to commentators (and to subsequent generations of historians), that the Austrians had lost out. Garibaldi and Cavour, and indeed Pietro Maestri had fought on the winning side. In September 1859 Pietro Maestri returned to Paris and resumed his life as an increasingly prominent commentator on the twin themes of politics and economics, primarily with respect to Italy.

Over the next couple of years Maestri became ever more prolific. Publications to which he contributed included "Gente latina" and "l'Espérance".

=== A vision for Italy ===
A recurring theme reflected in Maestri's articles and essays is the tension between centralisation and decentralisation of political power. He emerges as a federalist. In an article published in "Gente latina" on 7 November 1859 (and in other contributions in other publications dating from around the same time) he positioned himself in opposition to the excessive "top down" centralising philosophy apparent in the way that the Cavour government in Turin sought simply to incorporate the western half of what had been Lombardo-Veneto into what was left of the Kingdom of Sardinia. What Maestri wrote at this time comes as powerful confirmation of the federalist preferences already familiar to any student of his commentaries written a decade earlier, following the events of 1848/49. In order to avoid unnecessary shocks to the people affected, it was necessary that unification should be a gradual process. A precipitate rush to "maximum administrative unity" would mean working towards a "general liquidation of people's interests" which would run contrary to the best interest of a "population who have just emerged from a [wide ranging political] crisis". (Note: "...attendere ad un lavoro di liquidazione generale degli interessi, incompatibile con le condizioni dei popoli usciti appena adesso da una crisi.") Maestri recommended, instead, a "régime combining political unity and administrative decentralisation" which both the ancient and the newly acquired provinces of the "Savoyard monarchy" would have to accept "as the practical route to [Italian] unification". National government competence should cover the great questions of foreign policy and [high level] domestic policy. Each municipal and parish level administration should have the maximum possible autonomy when it came to municipal and local administration. Each province should be guaranteed a wide-reaching level of freedom in respect of matters relating to its own territories. Maestri was an enthusiastic believer in a regional tier of government - between the national government in Turin (or Florence or Rome) and the municipal council in the town hall: "Between the provincial level and central government [it was necessary] to maintain and intermediate territorially defined administrative level, called 'the region', in order to ensure a homogenous and well balanced landscape, populated as it were by a single familial grouping, with its own coherent nature, organically derived administration, and a shared set of origins, traditions, customs and interests". (Note: "Tra la Provincia e il Governo centrale dovevasi mantenere quella circoscrizione territoriale ed amministrativa intermedia, che chiamasi Regione, e che risulta da un'omogenea e ben proporzionata superficie di paese, popolata quasi a dire da una sola famiglia, ed avente un tipo naturale proprio, un organismo amministrativo, ed una comunanza di origine, di tradizioni, di consuetudini e di interessi")

=== Government statistician ===
It is likely that Pietro Maestri would have found much to commend in the 1948 Italian constitution which features Regions ("regioni d'Italia") (Note: Regions were officially designated as "compartimenti" rather than as "regioni" in government publications in 1864 (which may have been the first time that any word was needed to define groupings of provinces that Maestri had drawn up "according to their topographical cohesion", as part of the analysis and publication of the 1861 census findings) and for some years after that. After 1870, use of the word "compartimenti" was increasingly set aside in favour of "regioni" when defining these geographical units, however. Even so, it was not till 1912 that the "Annuario Statistico Italiano" ("Italian Statistical Year Book") switched from the word "compartimento/compartimenti" to "regione/regioni".) which in most cases more or less correspond to the kingdoms, duchies and equivalent territories into which the Italian peninsula was divided before 1860. Since 1948 there has been a sustained programme of devolution, transferring power from the central government to the regions and, within the regions, to the provinces and major cities. In 1860, however, vision that inspired the constitutional arrangements selected for the newly united Italy came not from North America, Austria or Switzerland but from France. France was one of the two major states in western Europe where central governments had been systematically and effectively gathering power to themselves for at least five centuries. There was something tantalisingly logical and pre-packaged in Napoleon's blueprint for a modern European state, but for Pietro Maestri the centralising model that so appealed to Cavour and his king was quite unsuitable (except, perhaps, for France). Nevertheless, despite his disappointment at the centralising instincts of the Cavour government, Pietro was no longer subject to any residual ban. In 1862 he returned to settle in Italy where, for the most part, he now avoided commenting on constitutional matters, and successfully re-invented himself as a high-flying pioneering establishment economist-statistician.

According to at least one source, on 21 April 1862 Maestri was still living in France when he was appointed by royal decree to a post as head of the Statistics Directorate which had been established the previous year at the Ministry of Agriculture, Industry and Commerce. The appointment came with the "Class 1" grade in the hierarchy of government officials. Rome, though it had been declared as the capital city of Italy in 1861, was "captured" from the papal authorities only in September 1870. Between 1860 and 1865 Italy was governed from Turin. In 1865 its provisional capital was transferred to Florence. Maestri's relocation did not, therefore, involve any move to Rome. Elsewhere it is reported that Maestri was already installed as a senior government official by the end of 1861, and that Italy's first census, conducted on 31 December 1861, was organised under his capable direction. The resulting data and analysis appeared in 1864 in the "Italian Statistical Yearbook 1864" ("Annuario statistico italiano del 1864"). It was only the second time the publication had appeared, but it has subsequently become an annual publication The organisational framework which Maestri created was later applied without major modification in several subsequent censuses and other government-mandated exercises in statistical data capture. In addition to overseeing the production and distribution of governmental statistical reports, keeping the records up to date in respect of certain fast moving data, and developing the necessary systems to support these tasks in a period during which the statistical usage and practice was undergoing rapid change, Maestri's responsibilities also included participation at a considerable number of international conferences. He himself organised and international congress of statisticians at Florence in Autumn/Fall 1867. The congress itself took place in the Uffizi Gallery while plenary sessions were held at the Medici Theatre ("Teatro Mediceo") (which had not actually been used as a theatre for many years). According to one commentator the Florence congress conferred "international fame" on Pietro Maestri. A section of it was expressly dedicated to the statistics of municipal authorities, a particularly timely concern during a period in which, in many countries and regions of western Europe, agricultural depression caused by newly transportable food imports from America, along with the lure of wage levels that were generally higher and more consistent in the factories than in the fields, meant that urban dwellers were outnumbering rural dwellers for the first time in history. He also continued frequently to team up with Cesare Correnti to take a lead in organising the National Statistical Council (la "Giunta centrale di statistica") and in other data collection projects.

In 1868 Maestri had a falling out with Emilio Broglio, his minister. Details of their dispute are not available, but it led to Maestri being suspended from his position for a month, with a corresponding loss of salary. Well before the end of the year the minister had "moved on", and Maestri evidently had no further career threatening difficulties with the politicians. Nevertheless, some of the most formidable books of his final years, concerning topics in Economics and Statistics, were published outside the ambit of the government Statistics Directorate.

=== Death ===
Pietro Maestri died at Florence on 4 July 1871 following "a short illness".

== Awards and honours ==
Military
- 15 June 1859: Silver Medal for Military Valour

Academician

- 4 April 1861: Corresponding Member of the Lombard Academy of Sciences and Letters

Other Civil

- 17 June 1866: Commander of the Order of Saints Maurice and Lazarus
- 1867: Knight of the Imperial Order of Franz Joseph
- 1867: Knight of the Order of the Zähringer Lion
- 1867: Knight of the Order of the Polar Star
- 1867: Knight of the Legion of Honour
- (before 1869): Knight of the Order of Philip the Magnanimous
- (before 1869): Knight Second Class of the Order of Saint Anna of Russia
- (before 1870): Commander of the Order of the Crown of Italy
- (before 1870): Knight of the Order of the Netherlands Lion
- (before 1870): Commander of the Order of Merit of Saint Michael of Bavaria
