= Restelli =

Restelli is a surname. Notable people with the surname include:

- Antonio Restelli (1877–1945), Italian cyclist
- Dino Restelli (1924–2006), American baseball player
- Francesco Restelli (1814-1890), Italian lawyer, activist and politician
- Mark Restelli (born 1986), Canadian football linebacker
