= Luigi Bodio =

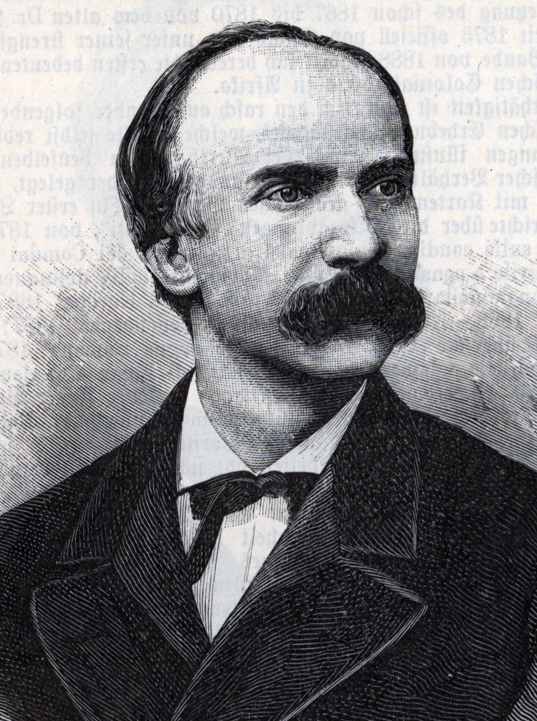
- Born: October 12, 1840; Milan
- Died: November 2, 1920 (aged 80); Rome
- Occupations: Economist and Statistician
- Known for: Among the founders of Italian Statistical System, was one of the first Presidents of the International Statistical Institute.

Luigi Bodio (born 12 October 1840 in Milan–2 November 1920 in Rome) was an Italian economist and statistician, among the founders of Italian Statistics. He was the first General Secretary of the International Statistical Institute (ISI) and among the first Presidents of ISI.

== Biography ==
Bodio graduated in 1861 at University of Pisa as a doctor of law, and afterward traveled abroad with government scholarship to complete his postgraduate education in economics and statistics. In 1864 he became Professor in National Economics in Livorno, and in 1867 also in Milan. From 1868 to 1872 Bodio was Professor in Economics and Economic Geography at University of Venice. In 1872, after the death of Pietro Maestri, he was President of the Italian Royal Statistical Office (founded by Maestri) in Rome. Since 1876 Bodio was an editor, together with Cesare Correnti and Paolo Boselli, of the "Archivio di statistica". In the same year, he conducted the first official surveys on Italian migration. In 1882 Bodio became a member of the Accademia Nazionale dei Lincei.

In 1885 was a founding member and General Secretary of the International Statistical Institute up to 1905. In 1909 he was elected President of the International Statistical Institute and remained in charge until his death in 1920. In 1900 Bodio was elected National Senator, and he was General Commissioner of Migration (1901–04), an Inter-ministerial Body created to address and protect the Italian migration abroad. In 1996, the International Cooperation Centre for Statistics (ICstat) was dedicated to Luigi Bodio in recognition of his dedication and promotion of the statistical cooperation.

== Writings ==
- "Statistique internationale des caisses d'épargne", 1876
- "Saggio sul commercio esterno terrestre e marittimo del regno d'Italia", 1865
- "Dei documenti statistici del regno d'Italia", 1867
- "Dei rapporti della statistica coll' economia politica e colle altre scienze affini", 1869
- "Del patrimonio delle entrate e delle spese della pubblica beneficenza in Italia", 1889
