= Andrea Maffei =

Italian poet, translator and librettist

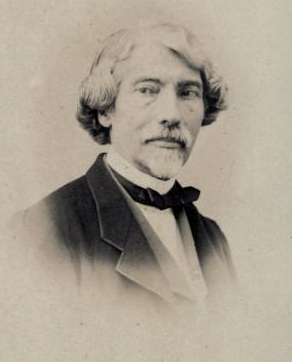
Andrea Maffei

Andrea Maffei (1798 – 1885) was an Italian poet, translator and librettist. He was born in Molina di Ledro, Trentino. A follower of Vincenzo Monti, he formed part of the 19th-century Italian classicist literary culture. Gaining laurea in jurisprudence, he moved for some years to Verona, then to Venice and finally to Milan, where in 1831 he married contessa Clara Spinelli. They separated by mutual consent on 15 June 1846.

As well as Verdi, Maffei also built up close relationships with others in the Italian cultural scene of the time, including Vincenzo Monti, Antonio Rosmini, Gino Capponi, Mario Rapisardi, Carlo Tenca, the painter Francesco Hayez, and the sculptors Vincenzo Vela and Giovanni Duprè. Key cultural figures from the rest of Europe also passed through the lounge of his house in Milan, including Liszt and Stendhal. In 1879 Andrea Maffei was made a senator of the Kingdom of Italy and participated in Italian political life. In the mid-19th century he frequently lived at Riva del Garda, where he organised his rich art collection and where, in 1935, the town's Liceo classico was named after him.

He died in Milan in 1885.

== Translator and poet ==
Skilled in foreign languages, he translated several works of English and German literature into Italian, particularly the plays of Schiller, Shakespeare's Othello and The Tempest, many works of Goethe (including Faust) and John Milton's Paradise Lost. In his translations he sought to adapt the author's original thought to that of the Italian literary public.

Not only a translator, he was also a poet and Romanticist. For Giuseppe Verdi he wrote the famous libretto for I masnadieri, drawn from Schiller, and re-wrote some verses from Francesco Maria Piave's libretto for Macbeth. He was also a librettist for Pietro Mascagni, writing the texts for his Il Re a Napoli in Cremona (1885) and Guglielmo Ratcliff (1895, from Heinrich Heine's 1822 play William Ratcliff).

=== Translations ===
==== Gessner ====
- Idilli di Gessner (1821)

==== Thomas Moore ====
- Gli amori degli angeli (The loves of angels, 1836)
- Canti orientali (Oriental poems, 1836)
- Gli amori degli angioli (The loves of angels, 1839)

==== Byron ====
- Caino (1852)
- Cielo e terra (1853)
- Parisina (1853)
- Misteri e novelle (Mysteries and novels, 1868)

==== Goethe ====
- Arminio e Dorotea (1864)
- Fausto (1866)

==== Schiller ====
- La sposa di Messina (1827)
- Maria Stuarda (Mary Stuart, 1829)
- La vergine d'Orleans (The Maid of Orléans, 1830)
- Guglielmo Tell (William Tell, 1835)
- Maria Stuarda (Mary Stuart, 1835)
- Guglielmo Tell (William Tell, 1844)
- Cabala ed amore (1852)
- La congiura del Fiesco (1853)
- Turandot (1863)

==== Other works ====
- Le satire e le epistole (after 1853)
- Il paradiso perduto (Paradise Lost, by Milton, 1857)
- Struensee (1863)
- Guglielmo Ratcliff (by Heinrich Heine, 1875)
- L'ode a Pirra (by Horace, c. 1880)
- Poeti tedeschi (German poets, 1901)

=== Original works ===
- La preghiera (1829)
- Studi poetici (1831)
- Dal Benaco (1854)
- Poesie varie (1859)
- Arte, affetti, fantasie (1864)
- E' morto il re! (1878)
- Liriche (1878)
- Affetti (1885)
- Ghirlanda per una sposa (1886)

==== Opera libretti ====
- I masnadieri (Her Majesty's Theatre, London, 22 July 1847, music by Giuseppe Verdi)
- David Riccio : 2-act drama, with prologue (1849) music by Vinc. Capecelatro (1850)
- Macbeth (Additions to the original): 4 part melodrama, music by Giuseppe Verdi (1850)
