= Francesco Novati =

Italian historian and philologist (1859–1915)

Francesco Novati (10 January 1859 – 27 December 1915) was an Italian historian and philologist.

== Biography ==
Novati taught in the University of Palermo and Genoa, and in 1890 he became a professor of history and comparative literature at the Regia Accademia Scientifico-Letteraria of Milan. In 1883, he founded the Giornale Storico delle Letteratura Italiana with Rodolfo Renier and Arturo Graf. He also collaborated with many other magazines and newspapers: La Perseveranza, Il Libro e la stampa, La lettura, and Il Corriere della Sera e l’Archivio Storico Lombardo, a publication of the Società Storica Lombarda which Novati joined in 1879, later to become adviser, vice president, and finally president in 1899. The library and archive of Novati letters were donated to the Biblioteca Braidense of Milan in 1916.

Among his works are Il Repertorio diplomatico Visconteo, Flos duellatorum: Il Fior di battaglia di maestro Fiore dei Liberi da Premariacco, and an edition of Pietro and Alessandro Verri's Carteggio.
