= La Perseveranza =

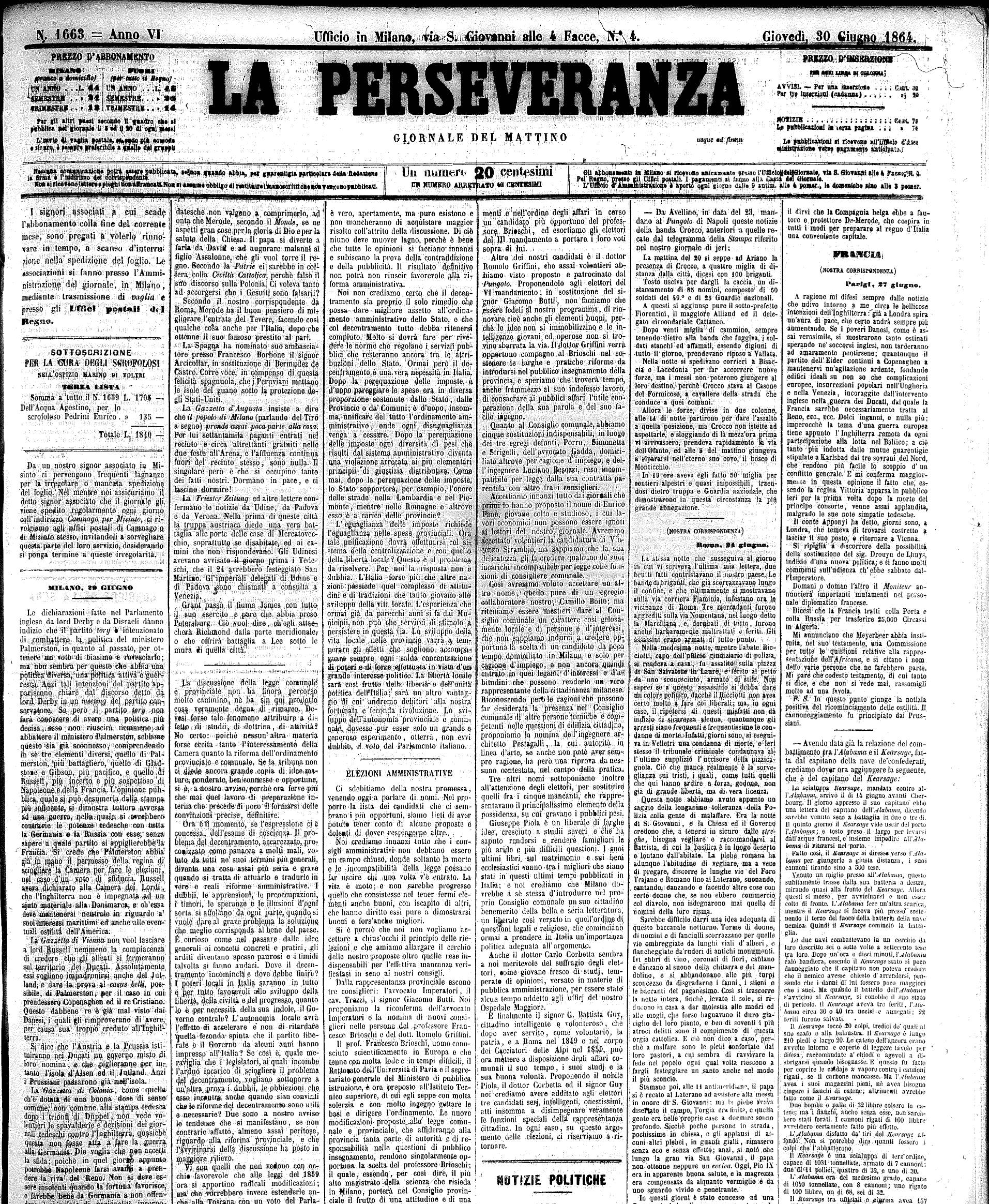
A page from "La Perseveranza", No. 1663, 1864

La Perseveranza was a daily newspaper founded in Milan, the capital of Lombardy, on 29 November 1859 and published till 20 May 1922. It was generally representative of the centre-right political establishment, though there were occasions when it proved more than capable of taking an independent position.

== History and profile ==
The paper was founded by a group of liberals and monarchists a few days after the annexation of Lombardy to Piedmont-Sardinia in the wider context of Italian unification. Its founders were wealthy members of the city's leading families, politically supportive of the Piedmontese First Minister, Count Cavour's unification strategy. Three of the most prominent of them, Giovanni Visconti Venosta, Gaetano Negri and Stefano Jacini were members of the "Constitutional Association". The starting paid up share capital of 300,000 lire was considered lavish at the time. Beneath its title early editions of La Perseveranza carried the motto "Usque ad finem" ("On to completion" / "On to the end").

La Peresveranza was produced in a broadsheet format, and had a cover price of 20 cents, which was four times the price of most competitor newspaper. Created to support unification, it quickly became the newspaper of reference for the middle class moderates and supporters of the nationalist monarchism within Milan's ruling class.

The first managing editor, who remained in the post till 1866, was Pacifico Valussi. Valussi handed over control to Ruggero Bonghi, who on occasion displayed a formidable capacity for polemical journalism, and who demonstrated no great respect for Umberto I of Italy after 1878. Bonghi presided over a period of expansion, raising circulation to ten thousand copies.

In the aftermath of the Franco-Prussian War, in 1870, Bonghi used La Perseveranza to insist that the inhabitants of Alsace-Lorraine must be permitted to vote in a referendum before any decision could be taken to transfer the territories from France to Germany. On the home front he was an acute observer of Italian political trends, and sought in the newspaper's columns to oppose the crushing of the political right in the region threatened between 1862 and 1864 by conflict between the haut bourgeois "Pietmontese party" and the more aristocratically focused "Tuscan Party" centred on Florence, and the tendency to respond to crises outside parliament, in ways that he believed caused major damage to the new representative institutions of the Italian constitution. In this respect "La Perseveranza" helped to make the more moderate and modern conservatism of Lombardy more mainstream within Italian conservatism generally, sustaining understanding of the need to overcome historically based internal divisions.

La Perseveranza also took good care of the arts and culture. Contributors included Diego Sant'Ambrogio (arts criticism) and Francesco Novati (literary criticism).
