= ICstat =

ICstat - Centro per la Cooperazione Statistica Internazionale Luigi Bodio

- Abbreviation: ICstat
- Formation: 1 April 1996
- Type: Non Profit
- Purpose: International Cooperation (statistics, economics, law)
- Headquarters: Rome (Italy)
- Region served: World Wide
- President: Mauro Masselli

ICstat, "Centro per la Cooperazione Statistica Internazionale - Luigi Bodio" (International Cooperation Center for Statistics) is a non-profit association, based in Rome, created on April 1, 1996. The Association promotes the international cooperation in the field of statistics, economics and law. ICstat co-ordinates technical assistance projects financed by international institutions (EC, World Bank, FAO, MAE etc.) and is particularly involved in several Transition and Developing Countries. The Association supports democratic governance, crisis prevention and recovery, human rights application and monitoring systems, post-conflict political elections and referendum. Moreover ICstat produces studies for scientific and policy purposes.

== See also ==
- Sustainable development
- Development economics
- Economic development
