= Gabriele Buccola =

Italian psychologist and psychiatrist (1854–1885)

Gabriele Buccola (26 January 1854, Mezzojuso – 5 March 1885, Turin) was an Italian psychologist and psychiatrist of Arbëreshë origin who left a significant impact on the fields of experimental and physiological psychology, despite his short life.

== Biography ==
Buccola graduated in medicine from the University of Palermo in 1879. After graduation, he began working at the mental hospital in Reggio Emilia under the direction of Augusto Tamburini, where he had a unique opportunity to develop significant research. During this period, Buccola became known to the Italian scientific community with his early psychological works. He started investigating the relationships between stimuli and reactions in animals and humans, discovering several tools for accurately measuring the reaction time of the organism to stimuli.

In 1881, Buccola won an assistantship competition and moved to the Psychiatric Institute of Turin, directed by Enrico Morselli. Here, he was among the first Italian psychiatrists to undertake research in experimental and physiological psychology. He analyzed reaction times to specific stimuli in both humans and animals, using innovative machines to measure different reaction times. His results were published in his most significant work, "La legge del tempo" ("The Law of Time"), in 1883.

Buccola's work was influenced by the intellectual movements of his time, including Darwin's evolutionism, Spencer's philosophy, Wundt's psychophysiology, and French pathological psychology. He was particularly known for his role as a pioneer of experimental psychology in Italy and created a rigorous laboratory research program focusing on studying basic and higher psychological processes and the factors influencing these processes.

In 1883, Buccola was appointed a free lecturer for university teaching, and in 1884, he won a competition for specialization in Munich. However, he could not fully benefit from these opportunities due to an incurable illness that led to his untimely death at the age of 31. Despite this, his intensive and innovative work during the last five years of his life helped lay the foundations of physiological psychology and psychometrics.

Buccola also directed the scientific journal "Gli Atomi" ("The Atoms"), remembered as one of the first Italian journals with liberal-socialist content. He left behind 33 works in the fields of physiology and psychology, including valuable contributions on reaction time, the inheritance of psychological traits, and mental hygiene.

In conclusion, Gabriele Buccola is considered one of the founders of experimental and physiological psychology in Italy, and his legacy continues to influence this field. Despite his short life, his contributions remain valuable and significant for the subsequent development of scientific psychology.
