= Henri Cernuschi =

French-Italian banker, economist and Asian art collector

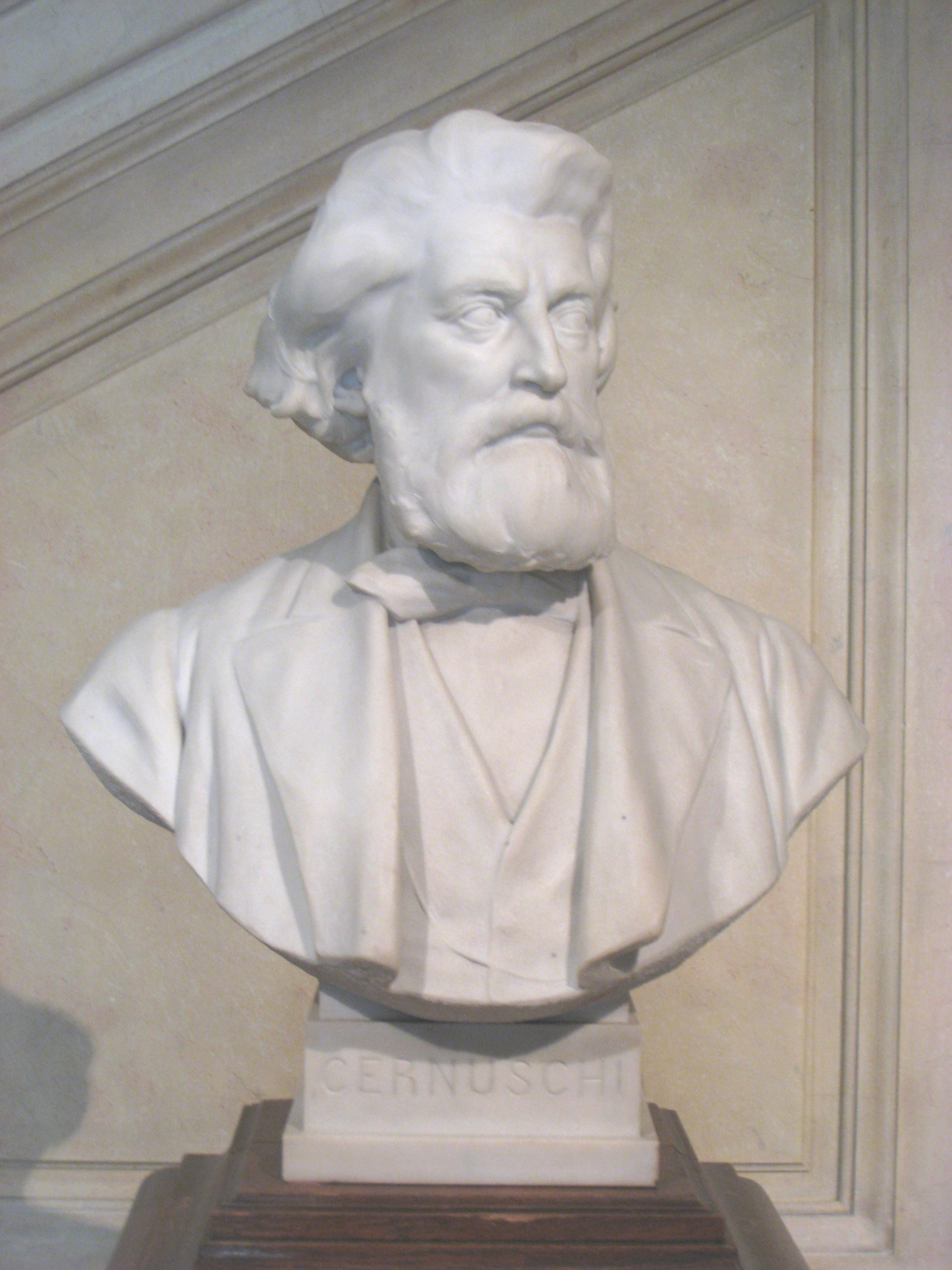
- Bust of Henri Cernuschi, artist unknown.
- Born: 19 February 1821; Milan, Lombardy–Venetia
- Died: 11 May 1896 (aged 75); Menton, France
- Occupation: Banker

Henri Cernuschi (French: [ɑ̃ʁi tʃɛʁnuski]; Italian: Enrico Cernuschi [enˈriːko tʃerˈnuski]; 19 February 1821 – 11 May 1896) was a major French-Italian banker, economist and Asian art collector, who began public life as a politician in Italy in 1848–1850.

== Life ==
Cernuschi was born of wealthy parents at Milan, and was destined for the legal profession. During his studies he became involved in the revolutionary movement. He played a conspicuous part in the insurrection at Milan in 1848, and also in the Roman Republic, where he had a seat in the Assembly. On the collapse of the revolutionary government he was arrested (1850), but managed to escape to France, where he engaged in commerce and banking, became naturalized, and acquired a large fortune. He took a prominent part in opposing the Socialist movement, and in April 1870, having subscribed a large sum to the funds of a committee formed to combat the Napoleonic plebiscite, had to leave the country.

In September the formation of the Third Republic enabled Cernuschi to return, but he soon left Paris to travel in the Far East. He returned with a fine art collection that he would constantly expand upon for the remainder of his life.

Cernuschi died at Menton in May 1896, and was interred at Père Lachaise Cemetery in Paris.

== Legacy ==
Cernuschi bequeathed his collection to the city of Paris, as well as his private residence at No 7. avenue Velasquez on the edge of Parc Monceau in the 8th arrondissement to be used as a museum. Open to the public today, the Cernuschi Museum collection includes Chinese art, funeral statuary, painted 8th-century silks, neolithic terracottas (3rd millennium BC), Japanese art (mostly bronze objects and sculptures, ceramics, paravents), ancient Persian bronze objects, an Amithaba Buddha from the 8th Century, plus examples of calligraphy.

== Works ==
As a banker, Cernuschi is best known for his publications on financial questions, more especially bimetallism. Of the latter he was an ardent champion, and the word itself is commonly supposed to have originated with him—at least in its English form it is first found in his Silver Vindicated (1876). Among his other works were: Mécanique de l'échange (1861); Illusion des sociétés coopératives (1886); Le Bimétallisme en Angleterre (1879); Le Grand Procès de l'Union latine (1884).
