= Francesco Restelli =

Italian politician

Francesco Restelli (5 October 1814 - 5 March 1890) was an Italian lawyer who became a patriot activist and, later, an Italian member of parliament.

== Biography ==
Francesco Restelli was born (and would eventually die) in Milan. He studied Law at the University of Pavia, though he preferred to devote himself to studying Social sciences. In 1840 he published a substantive essay in that discipline which had been written, in part, by Paolo Manio, a fellow student who had died aged just 24, leaving Restelli to finish the work. Four years later he was a participant at the Sixth Congress of Italian Scientists, which on that occasion was held in Milan. He attracted the interest of fellow delegates when he presented a detailed paper on commercial law, while highlighting contribution of industrial and commercial associations to public prosperity. For the next few years he worked as a lawyer.

On 18 March 1848 he hastened to join those manning the barricades. On 20 March Restelli joined Milan's Committee of Public Security, presided over by Dr.Angelo Fava. A couple of days later Field Marshal Radetsky withdrew the Austrian army from Milan, which left the city under the control of a hastily assembled provisional government. On 3 April 1848 Restelli was sent by the provisional government to Venice, which was under the control of its own provisional government, following Radetsky's strategic (and as matters turned out temporary) militarily withdrawal to the "Quadrilatero" forts. Restelli's mission was to foster agreement between Lombardy and Venice, while at the same time promoting the idea of a three way anti-Austrian union that would also include Sardinia-Piedmont.

His mission concluded on 20 July 1848 and he returned to Milan where things were moving on. The fusion of "the city and province of Venice, the Sardinian states with Lombardy" had been decreed on 4 July 1848. The move had been overwhelmingly endorsed by a popular referendum in Lombardy, but the territories of Venice - aside from the city itself - had been militarily retaken at the end of June by the Austrians. The Austrians then defeated the army of Sardinia-Piedmont at Custoza on 24/25 July 1848. The defeat was far from overwhelming, but the Sardinian king was persuaded to sign an agreement with the Austrians on 4/5 August 1848 and withdrew his armies to the western bank of the Ticino. Regardless of the referendum result, a three way fusion with Piedmont and Venice was not about to happen, and in the Lombard capital the mood was one of political uncertainty. On 28 July 1848 Restelli joined Manfredo Fanti and Pietro Maestri in the Committee of Public Defence which effectively replaced the provisional government.

Once the Austrians and the Piedmontese had agreed what amounted to an armistice on 4/5 August 1848 it no longer made sense for the Milanese Committee of Public Defence to hold out against the Austrian troops, and on 6 August 1848, with Austrian forces already inside the city walls and advancing on the city centre, Francesco Restelli fled his native city, successfully making the highly journey dangerous north to Lugano in the southern part of Ticino (Switzerland) where he arrived the next day. Pietro Maestri had also managed to escape to Lugano where the two of them teamed up to write "Gli ultimi tristissimi fatti di Milano narrati/stampati dal Comitato di Pubblica Difesa" (loosely, "The latest very sad facts about Milan, told/published by the Committee of Public Defence"). (Note: From the slight differences in the title that are cited in the different sources it seems possible that the title was slightly changed between print runs.) They managed to get it printed in Venice where, still in 1848, several reprints were produced.

Restelli's exile lasted for more than half a decade. He moved from Lugano to Genoa (which at this stage, following the failure of a revolt in April 1849, was still part of Sardinia-Piedmont). He then relocated to Florence, which was still under Austrian control. In 1854, thanks to an amnesty agreed by the authorities, he was able to return to Milan. After Lombardy was liberated from Austrian control it became part of Sardinia-Piedmont, and in March 1860 Restelli was elected a member of parliament. He was re-elected to membership of the lower house ("Chamber of deputies") in successive elections over the next twenty-five years. It is probably misleading to try and subdivide Sardinian/Italian members of parliament in terms of political parties, but Francesco Restelli was a member of the large group of parliamentarians generally identified, in retrospect, as the Historical Right ("Destra storica"). On 11 February 1863 his fellow parliamentarians elected him one of the seven vice-presidents of the "chamber of deputies": he received 120 of the 218 votes cast. In December 1866 only four parliamentary vice-presidents were elected: Restelli was one of them. In the end Francesco Restelli was elected a vice-president of the "chamber of deputies" five times during the 1860s and 1870s. On 7 June 1886 he was appointed a member of the senate. (Appointment to the senate was - at least nominally - in the gift of the king: senators remained in place till they died.)
