= Clara Maffei =

Italian woman of letters (1814–1886)

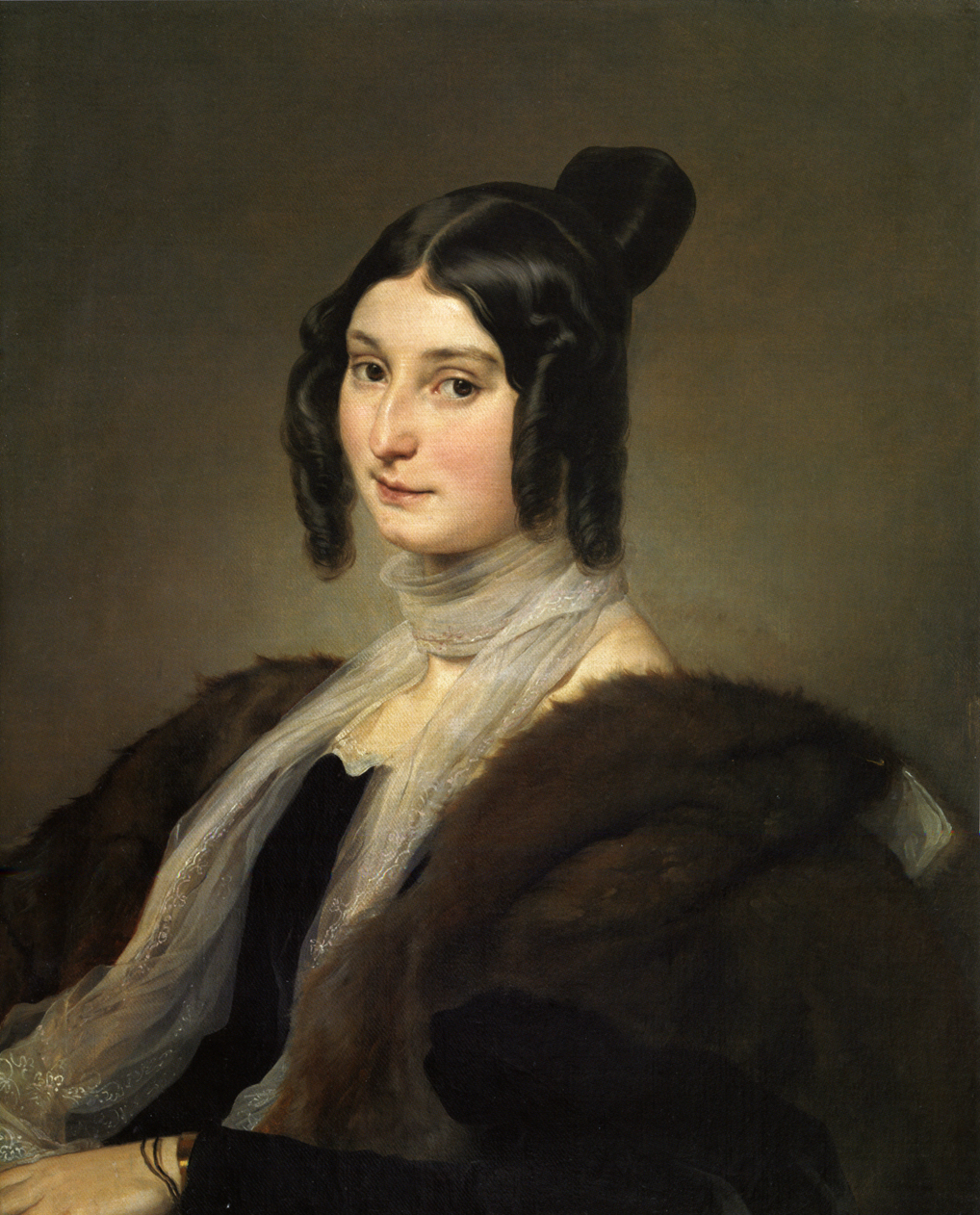
Portrait of Countess Clara Maffei by Francesco Hayez

Elena Clara Antonia Carrara Spinelli (13 March 1814 in Bergamo – 13 July 1886 in Milan), usually known by her married name of countess Clara Maffei or Chiarina Maffei, was an Italian woman of letters and backer of the Risorgimento.

== Life ==
At 17 years old she married Andrea Maffei, but they separated by mutual consent on 15 June 1846. She had a long and lasting relationship with Carlo Tenca.

She is well known for the salon she hosted in via dei Tre Monasteri in Milan, known as the Salotto Maffei. Starting in 1834 and organised by Tommaso Grossi and Massimo d'Azeglio, it attracted several well-known literati, artists, scholars, composers and pro-Risorgimento figures to meet to discuss art and literature. These included Alessandro Manzoni, Giuseppe Verdi, Giovanni Prati and Francesco Hayez (who painted a portrait of Clara which he then gave to her husband).

== Bibliography ==
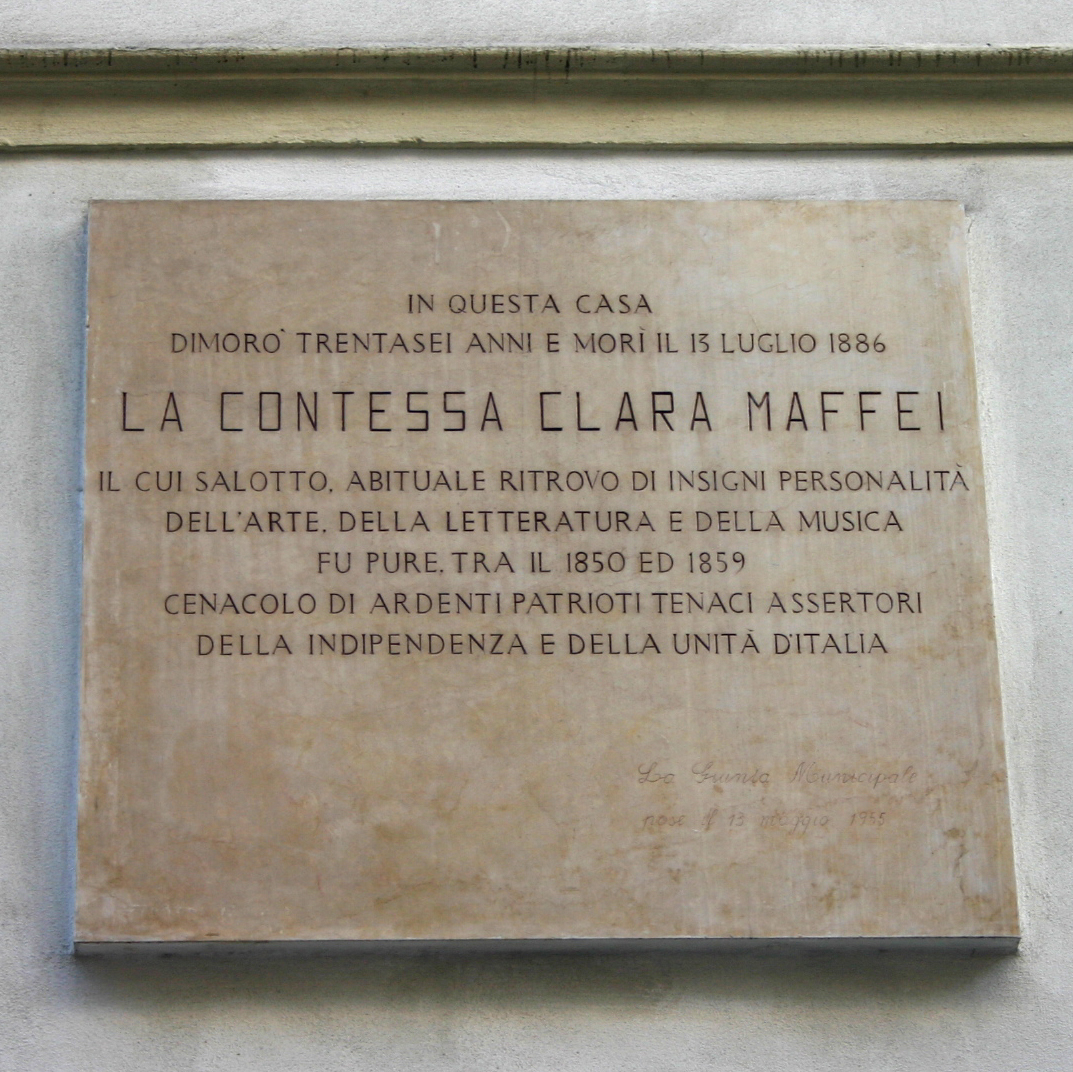
Inscription on the palazzo which hosted the "Salotto Maffei".

- Barbiera, Raffaello, Il salotto della contessa Maffei, Milano, Treves 1895 (new edition)
- Cunigi, Davide, "Una gentildonna bergamasca del Risorgimento. La contessa Clara Maffei", in Rivista di Bergamo, XX, February 1941, pp. 49–53, and March 1941, pp. 74–78
- Monti, Antonio, Una passione romantica dell'Ottocento. Clara Maffei e Carlo Tenca, Milano, Garzanti 1940
