= Carlo Tenca =

Italian politician (1816–1883)

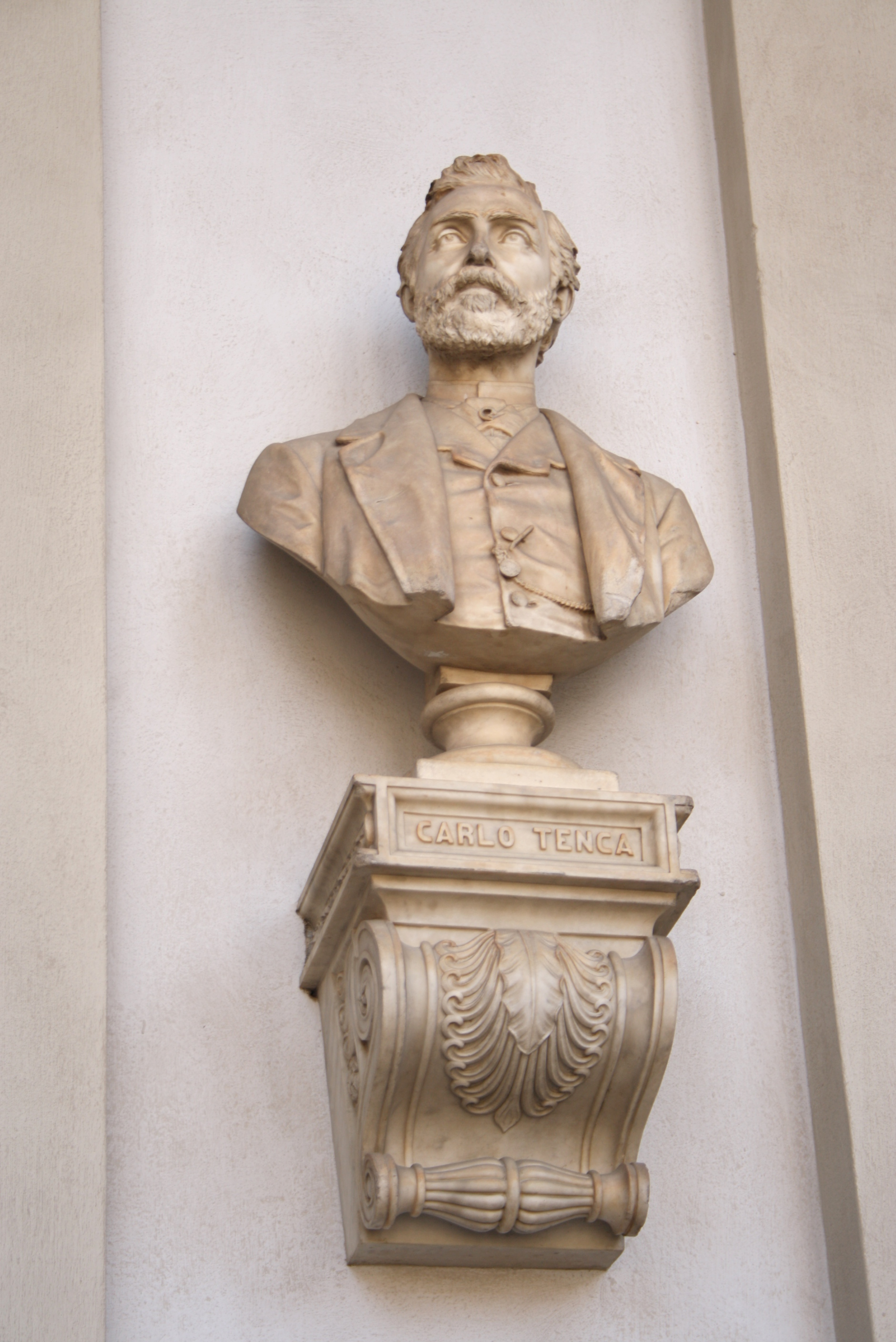
Carlo Tenca.

Carlo Tenca (19 October 1816 in Milan – 4 September 1883 in Milan) was an Italian man of letters, journalist, deputy and supporter of the Risorgimento. He was the central figure in the salon of Countess Clara Maffei, to whom he was romantically linked.

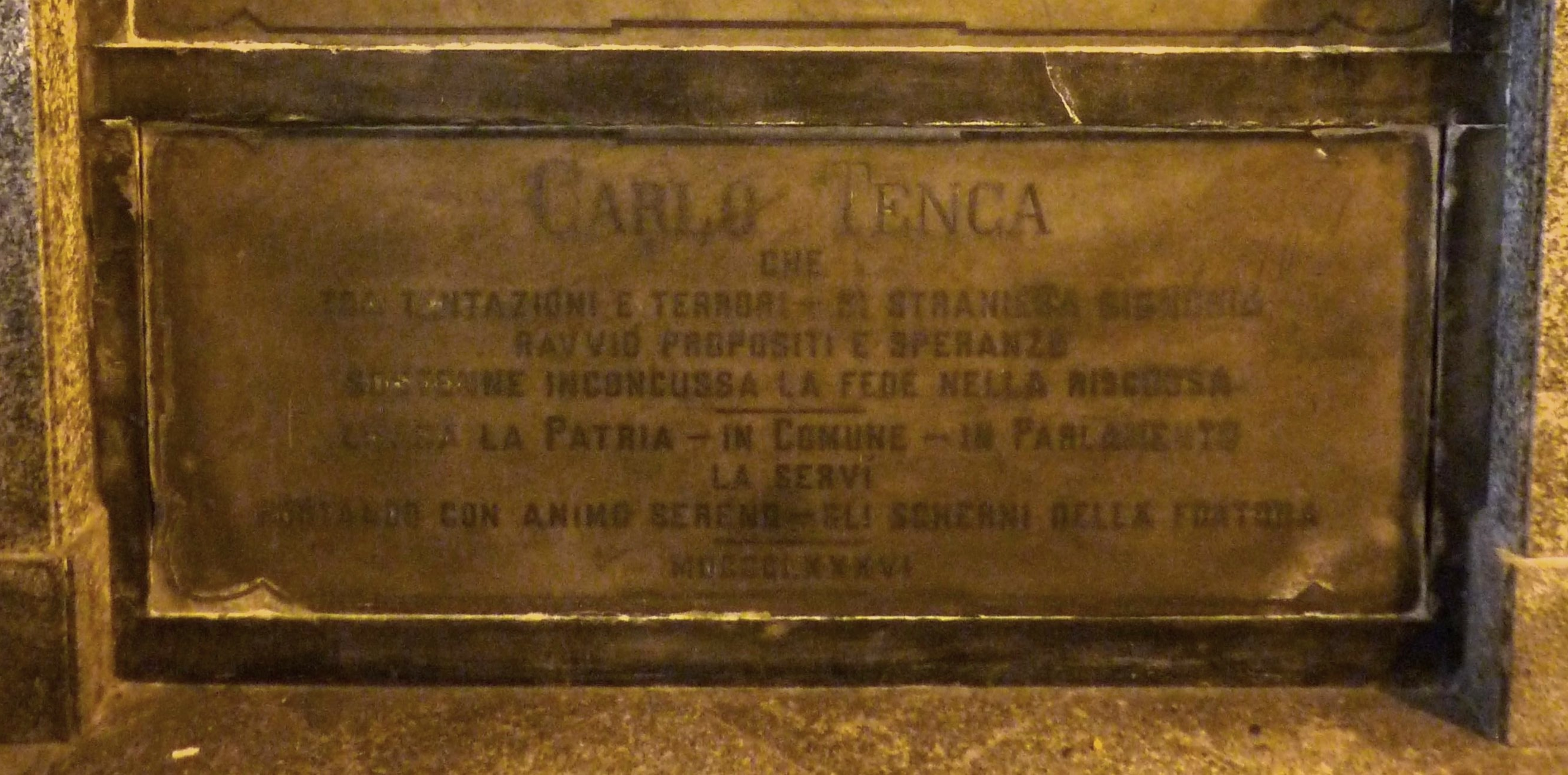
Tenca's grave at the Monumental Cemetery of Milan, Italy
