= Cesare Correnti =

Italian politician (1815–1888)

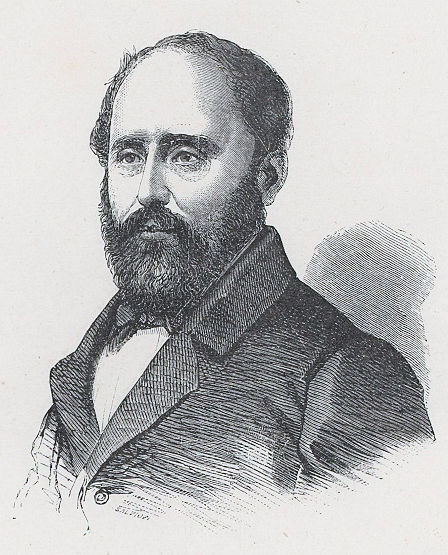
Cesare Correnti

Cesare Correnti (3 January 1815 – 4 October 1888) was an Italian revolutionary and politician.

== Life ==
He was born in Milan to a poor but noble family. While employed in the public debt administration, he flooded Lombardy with revolutionary pamphlets designed to incite hatred against the Austrians, and in 1848 proposed the general abstention of the Milanese from smoking, which gave rise to the insurrection known as the Five Days. During the revolt, he was one of the leading spirits of the insurgents' operations. Until the reoccupation of Milan by the Austrians, he was secretary-general of the provisional government, but afterwards, he fled to Piedmont, whence he again distributed his revolutionary pamphlets throughout Lombardy, earning a precarious livelihood by journalism.

Elected deputy in 1849, he worked strenuously for the national cause, supporting Cavour in his Crimean policy, although he belonged to the political Left. After the annexation of Lombardy, he was made commissioner for the liquidation of the Lombardo-Venetian debt, in 1860 was appointed councillor of state, and received various other public positions, especially in connection with the railway and financial administration. He veered round to the political Right, and in 1867 and again in 1869 he held the portfolio of education; he played an important part in the events consequent upon the occupation of Rome by Italy and helped to draft the Law of Guarantees.

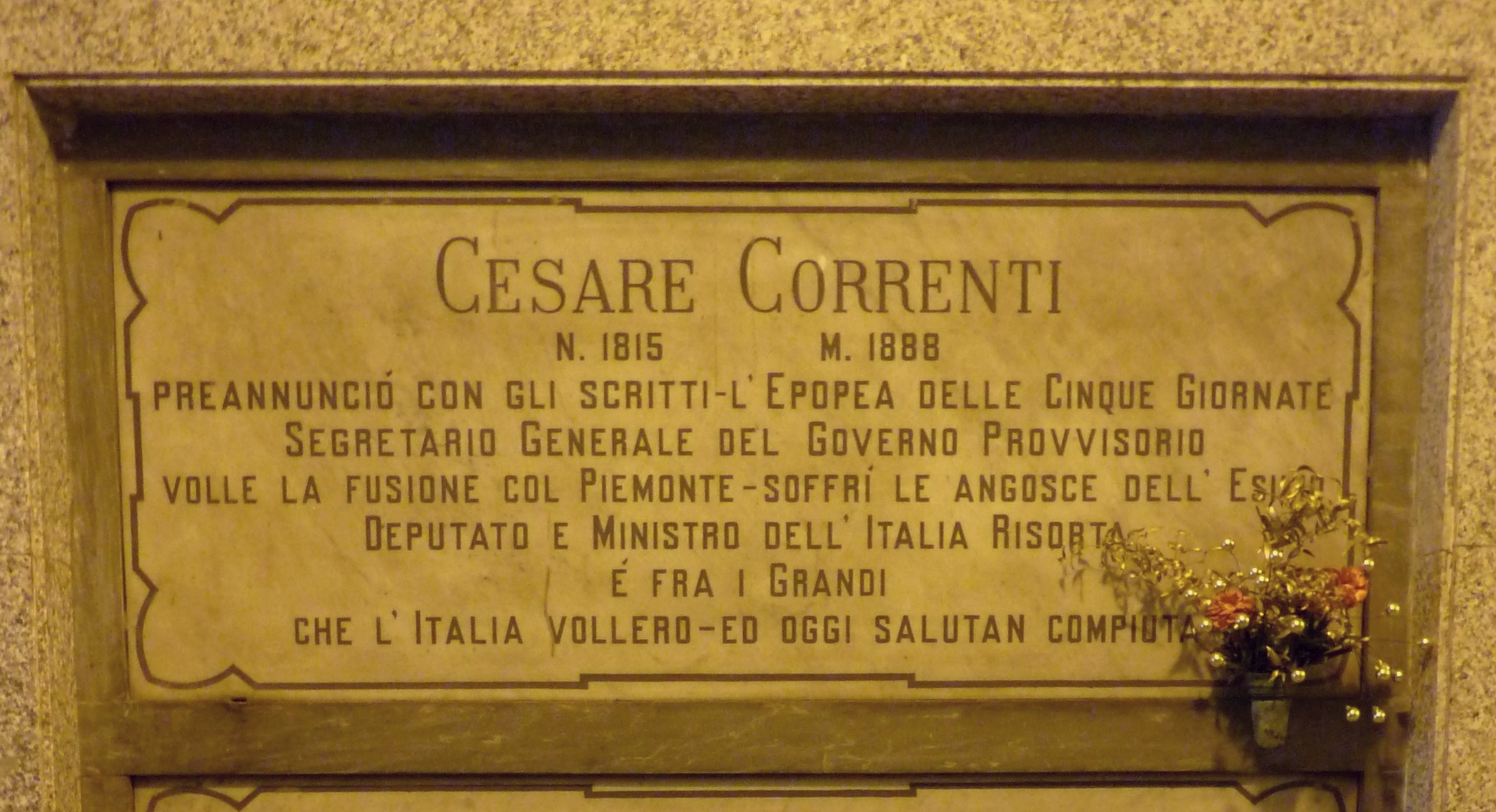
Correnti's grave at the Monumental Cemetery of Milan, Italy

As minister of education, he suppressed the theological faculties in the Italian universities, but eventually resigned office and allied himself with the Left again on account of conservative opposition to his reforms. His defection from the Right ultimately assured the advent of the Left to power in 1876; and while declining office, he remained chief adviser of Agostino Depretis until the latter's death. On several occasions — notably in connection with the redemption of the Italian railways and the Paris Exhibition of 1878 — he acted as representative of the government. In 1877 he was given the lucrative appointment of Secretary of the Order of Saints Maurice and Lazarus by Depretis, and in 1886 was made senator. He died in Rome, leaving a considerable body of writings on a variety of subjects, none of which is of exceptional merit.
