= List of people from Milan =

The following is a list of people from Milan.

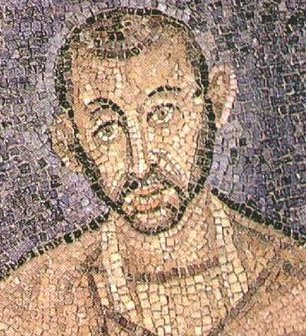
Ambrose

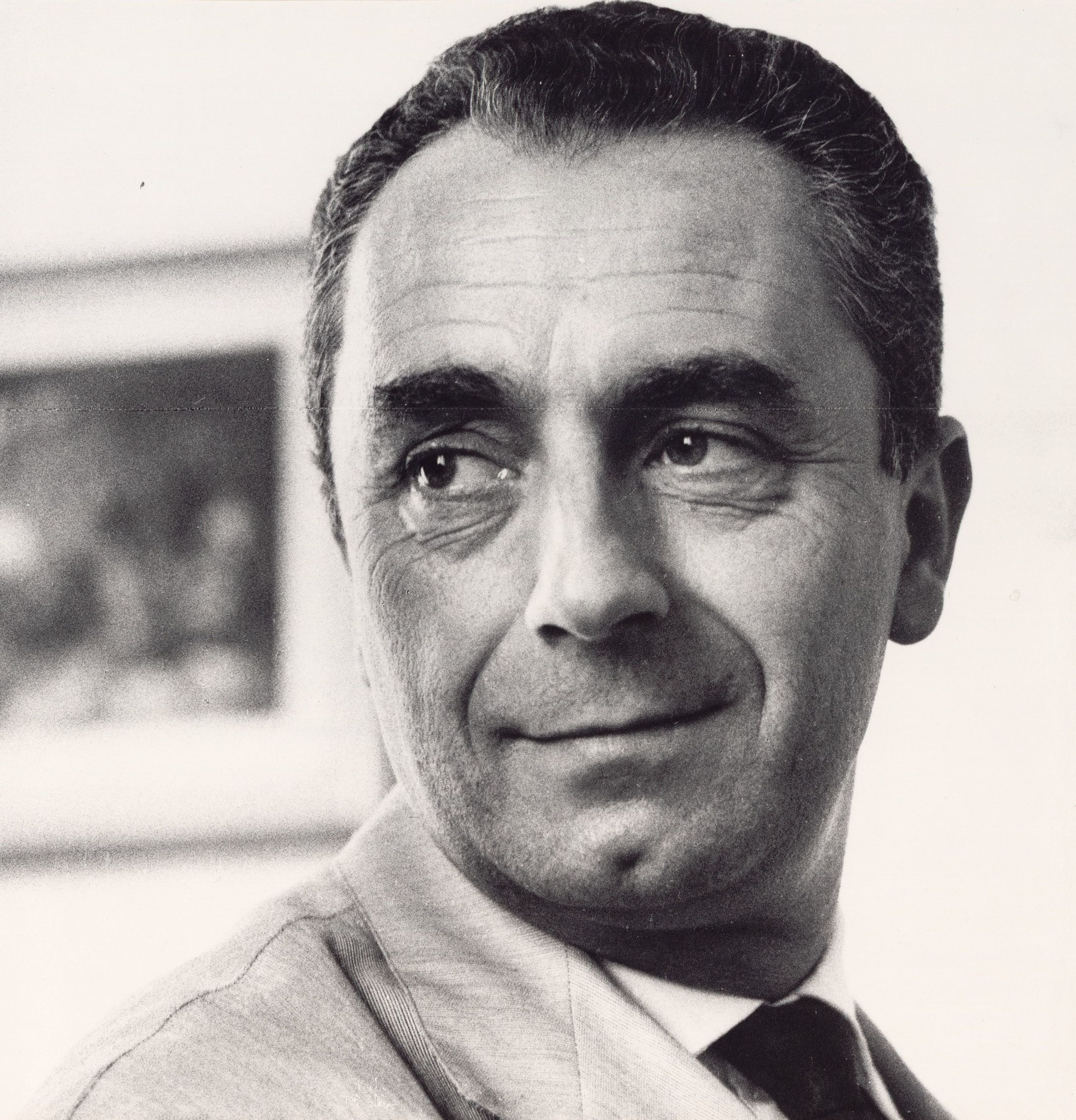
Michelangelo Antonioni

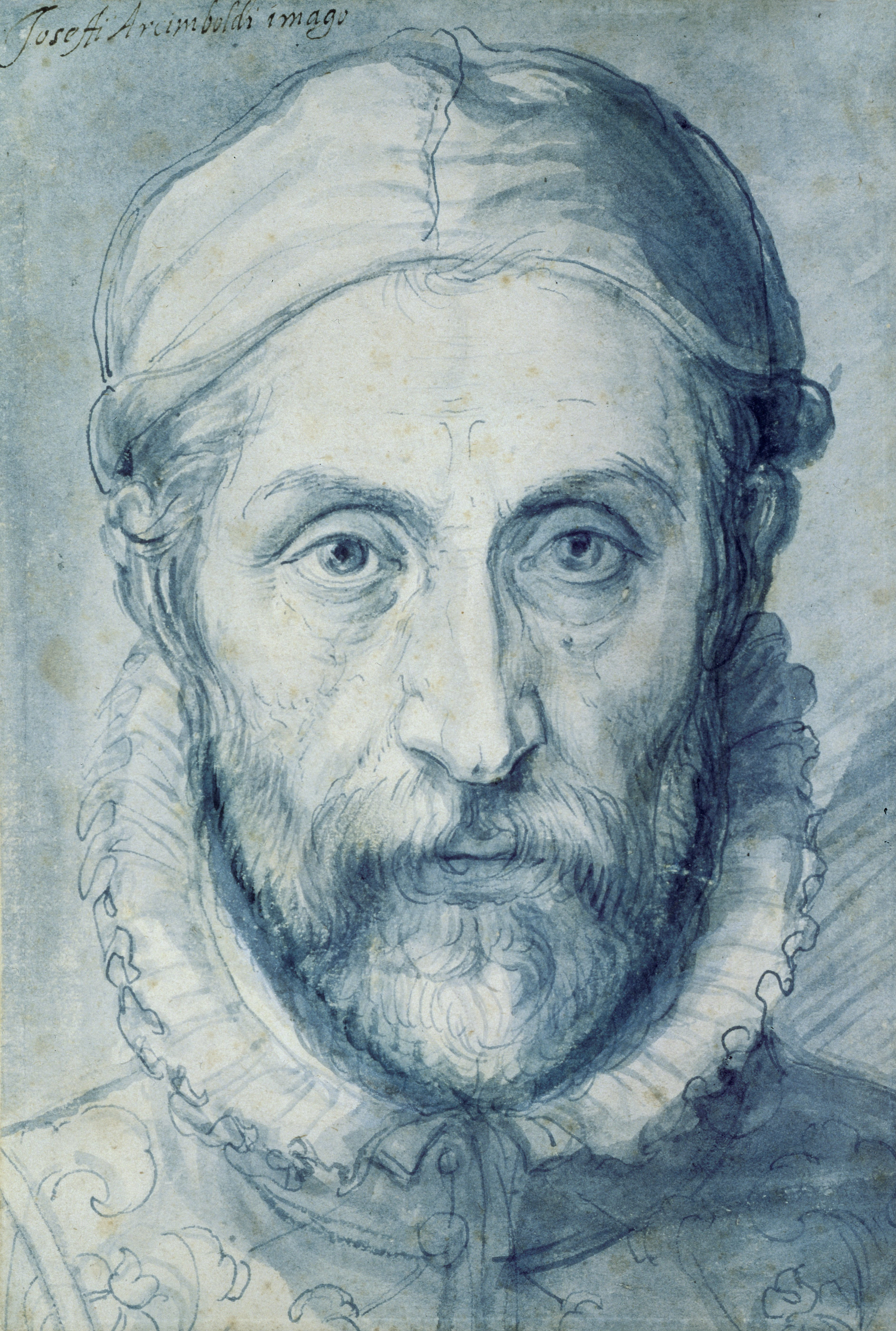
Giuseppe Arcimboldo

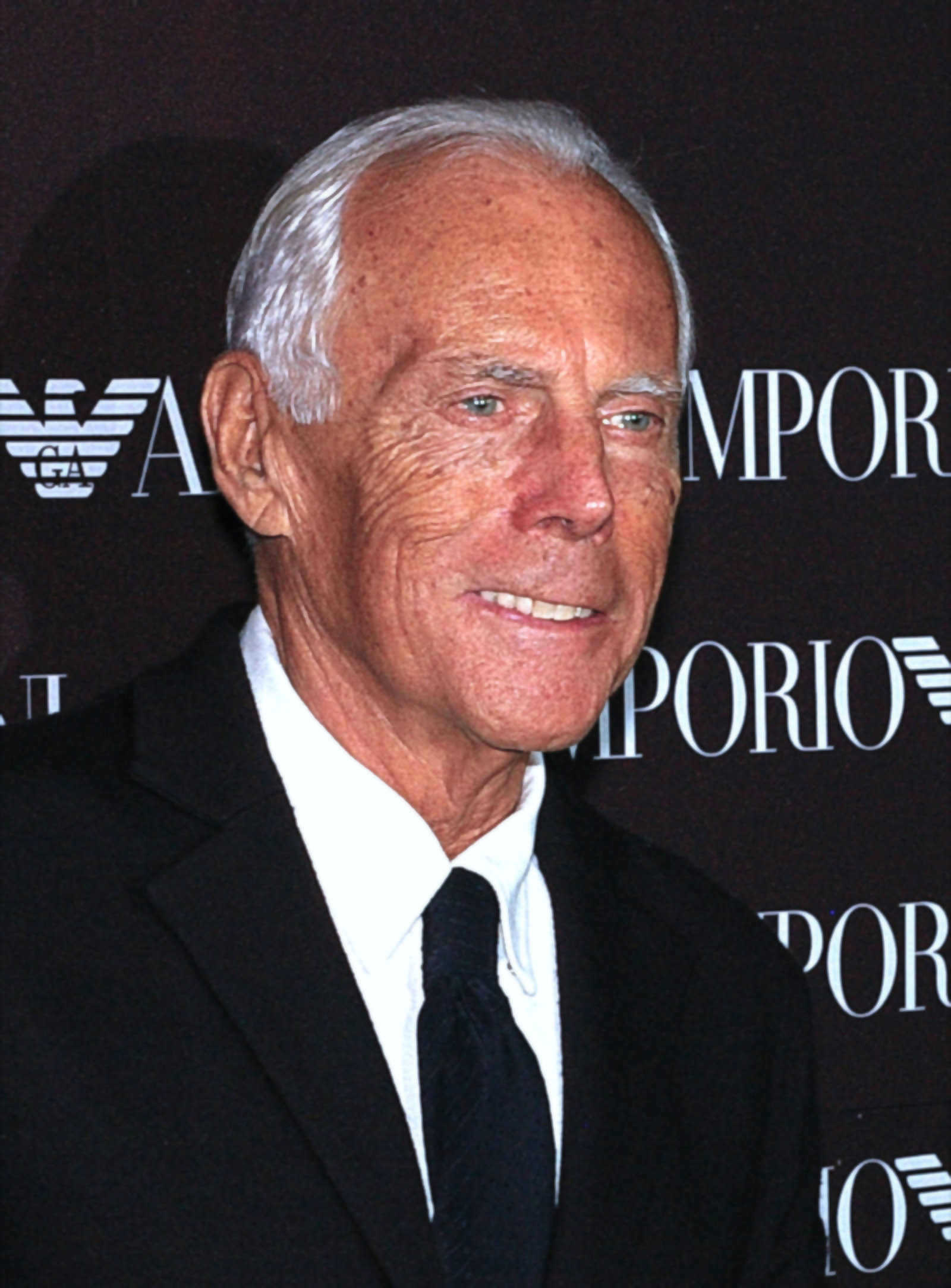
Giorgio Armani

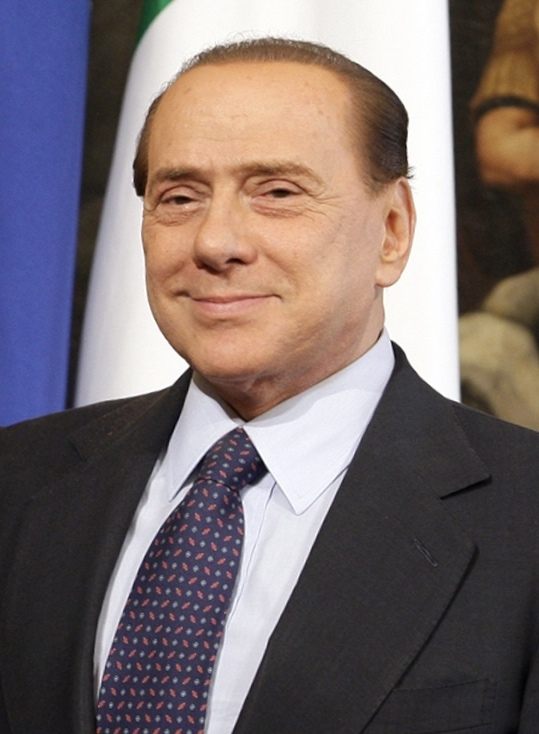
Silvio Berlusconi

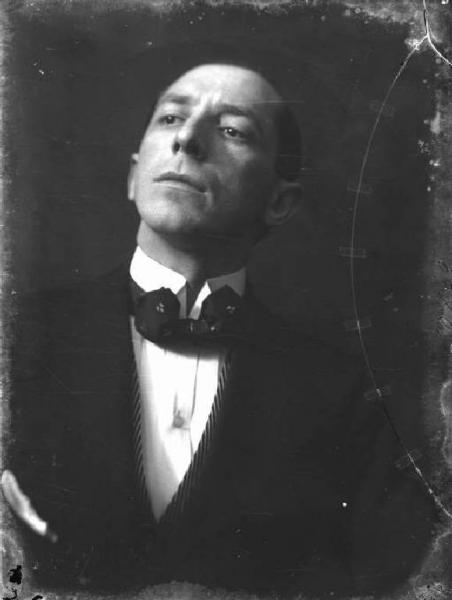
Umberto Boccioni

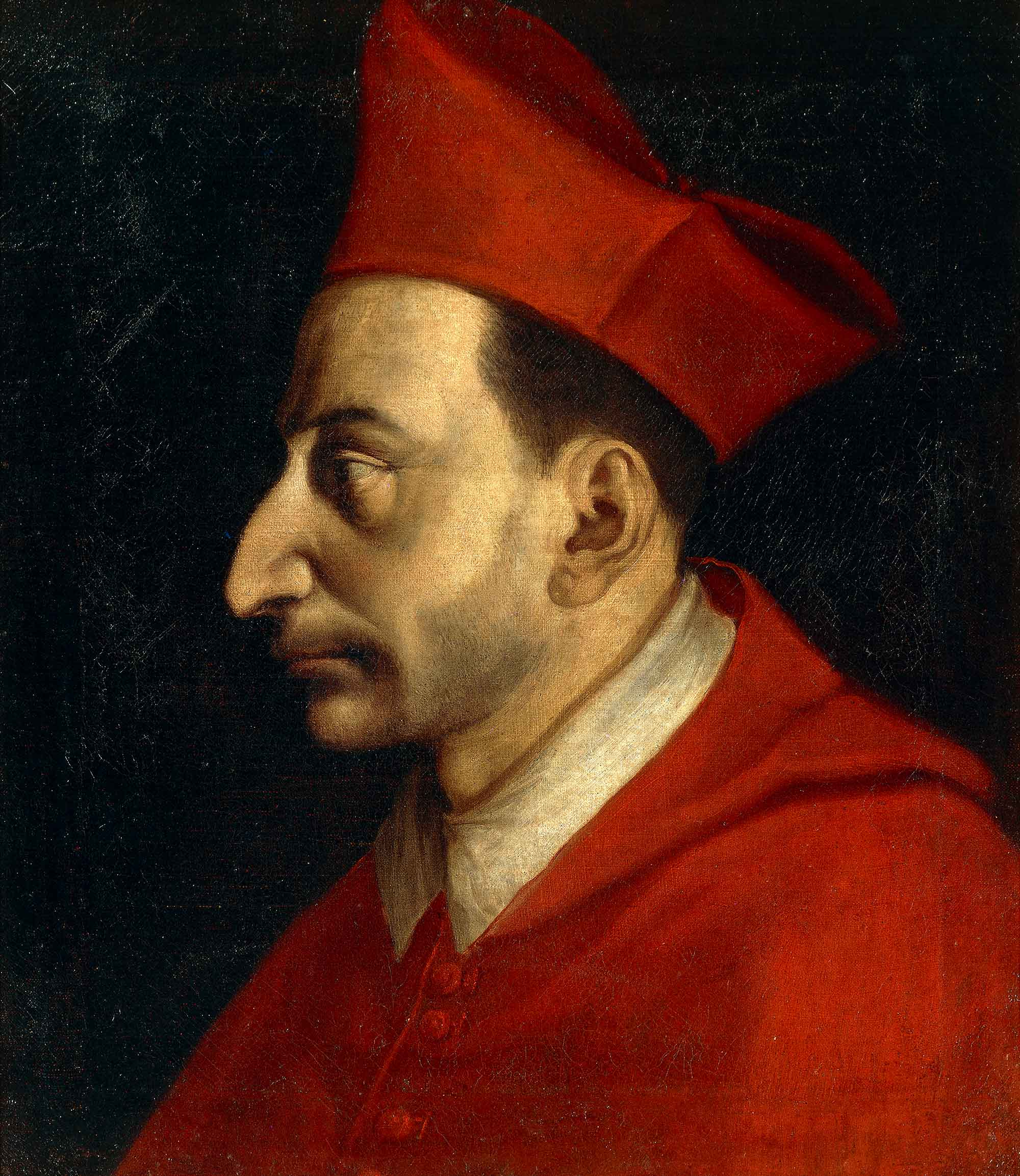
Charles Borromeo

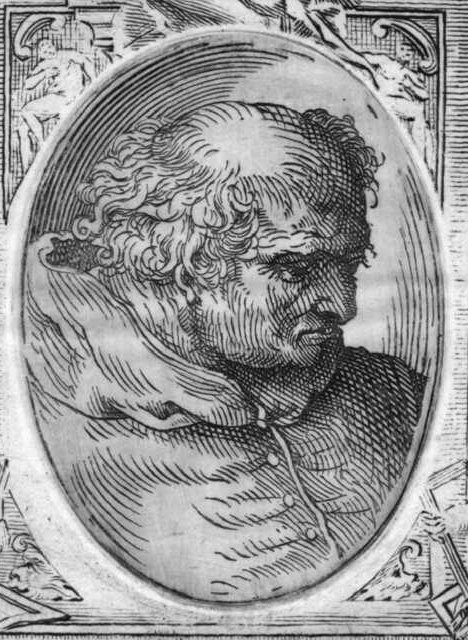
Donato Bramante

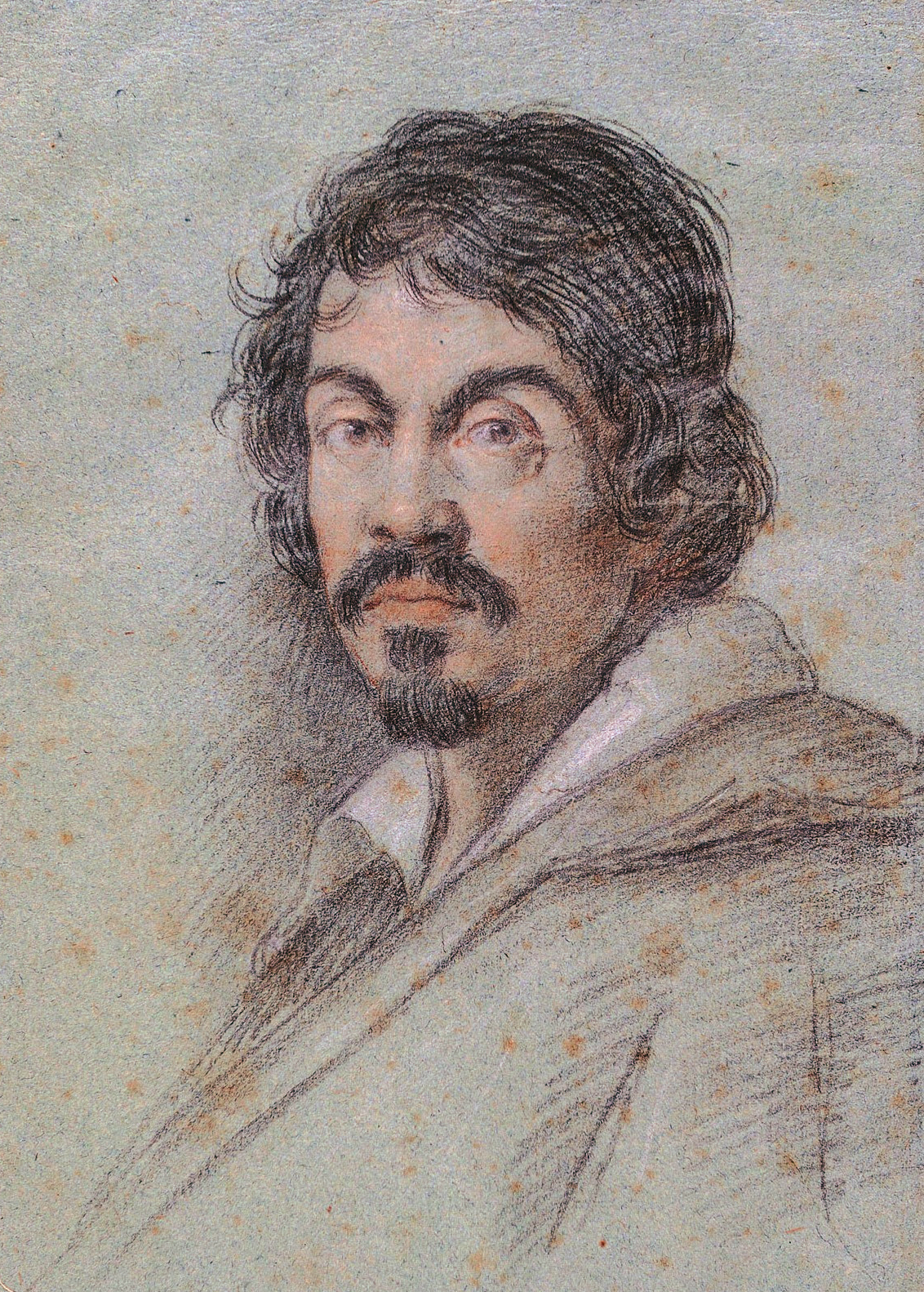
Caravaggio

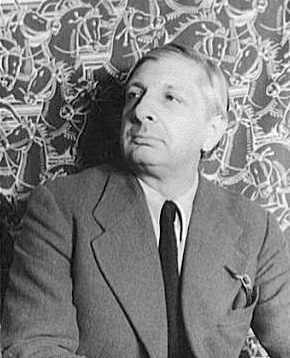
Giorgio de Chirico

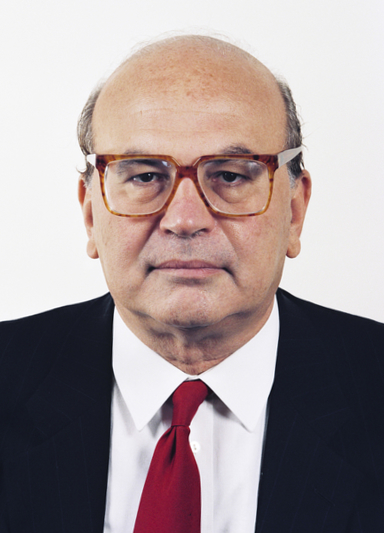
Bettino Craxi

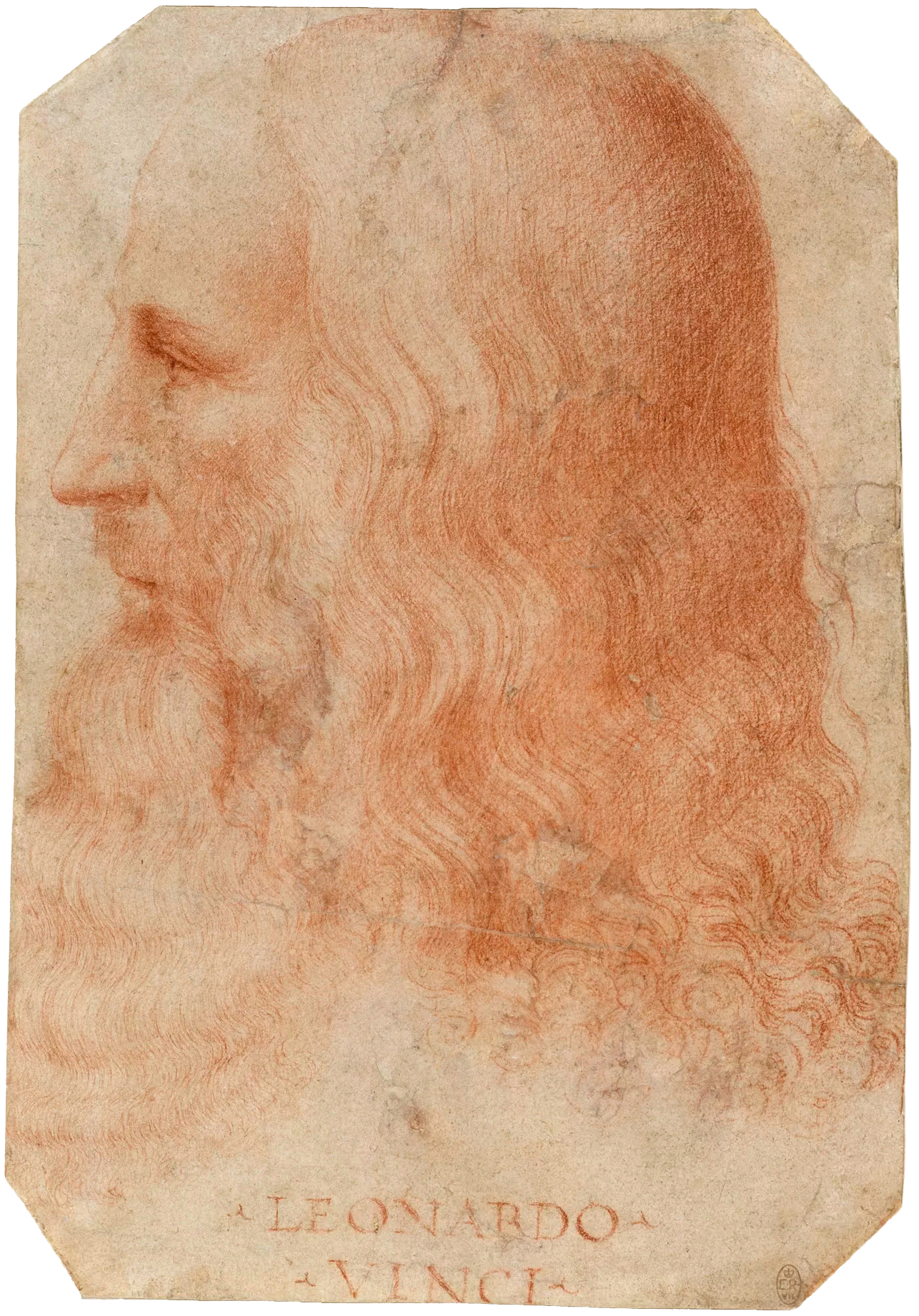
Leonardo da Vinci

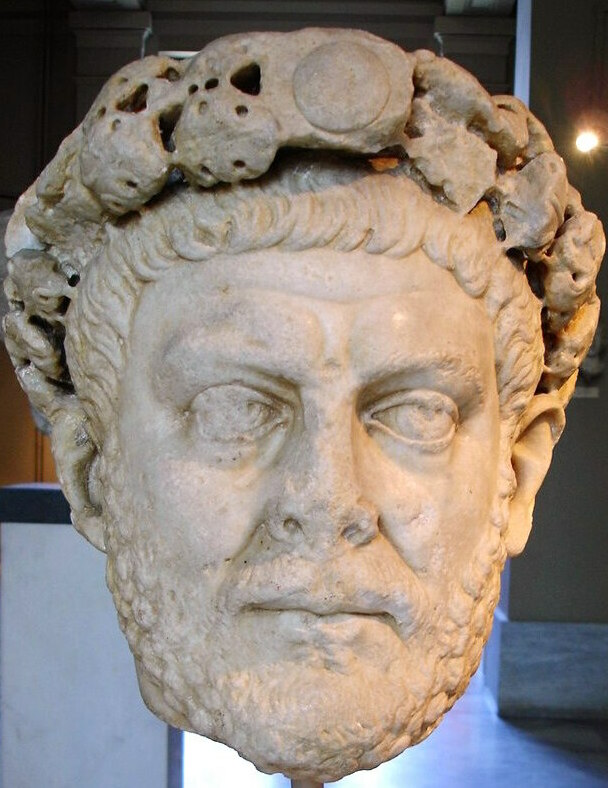
Diocletian

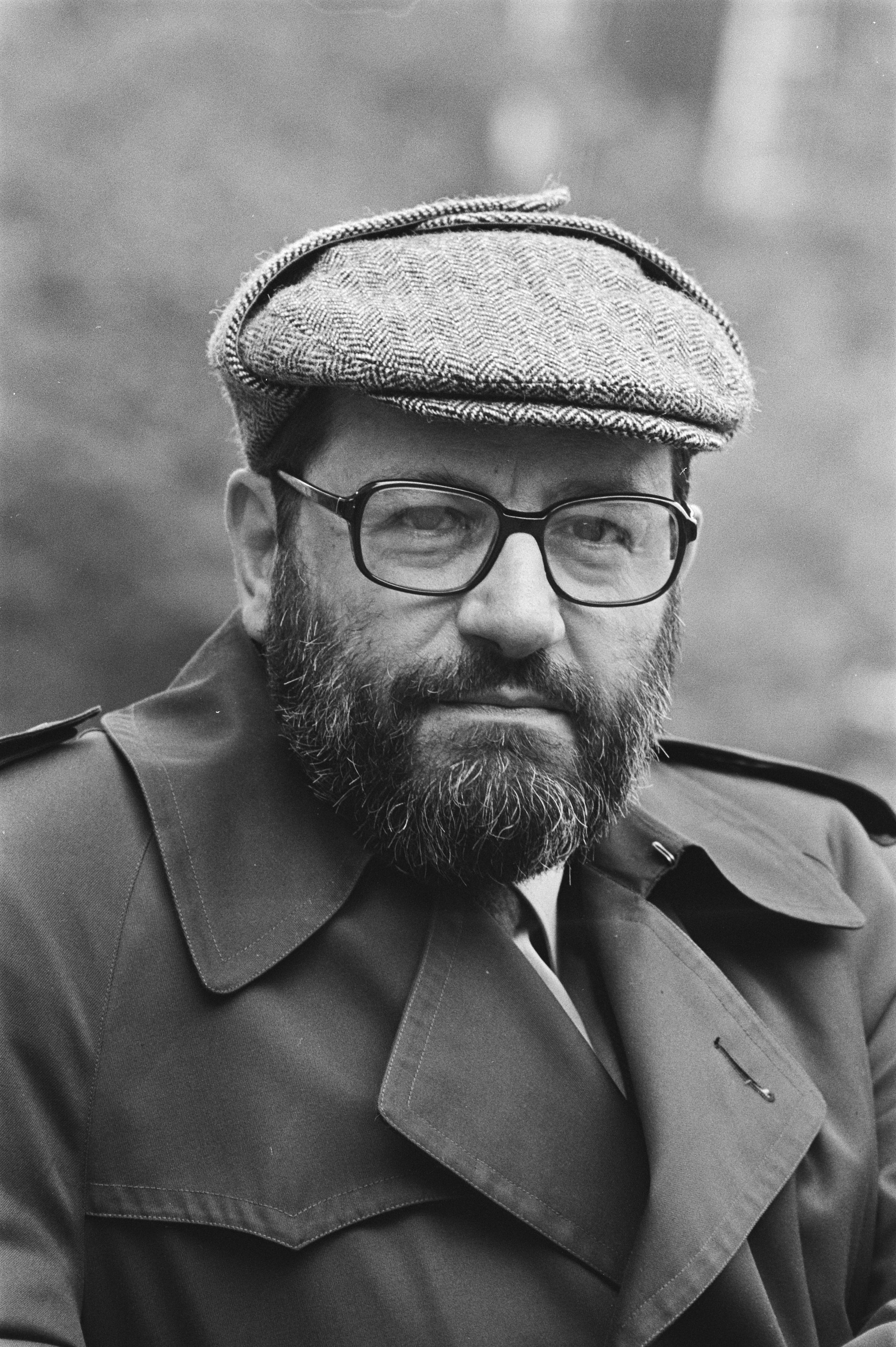
Umberto Eco

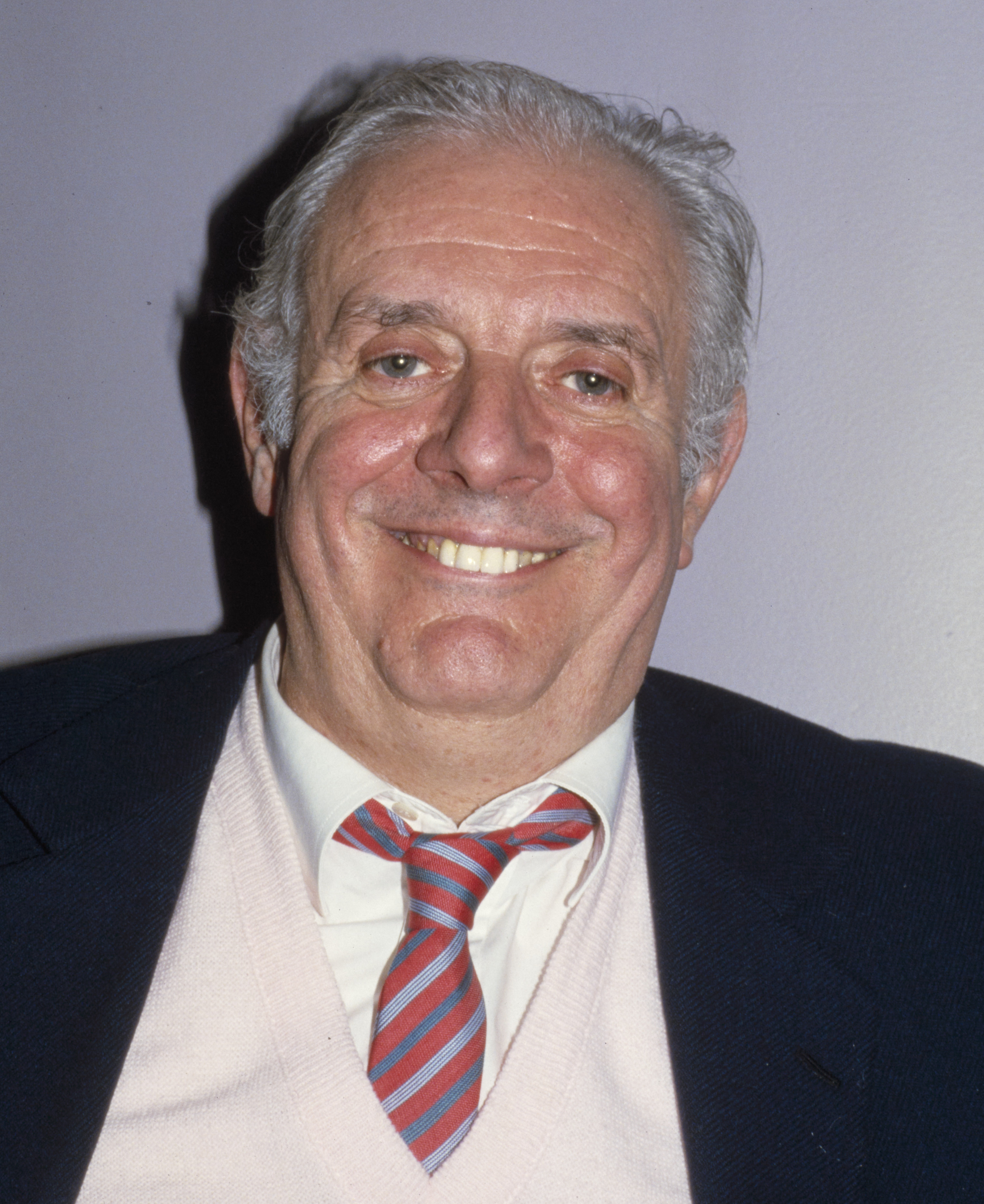
Dario Fo

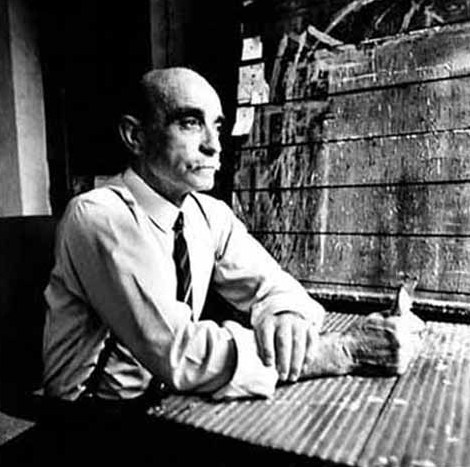
Lucio Fontana

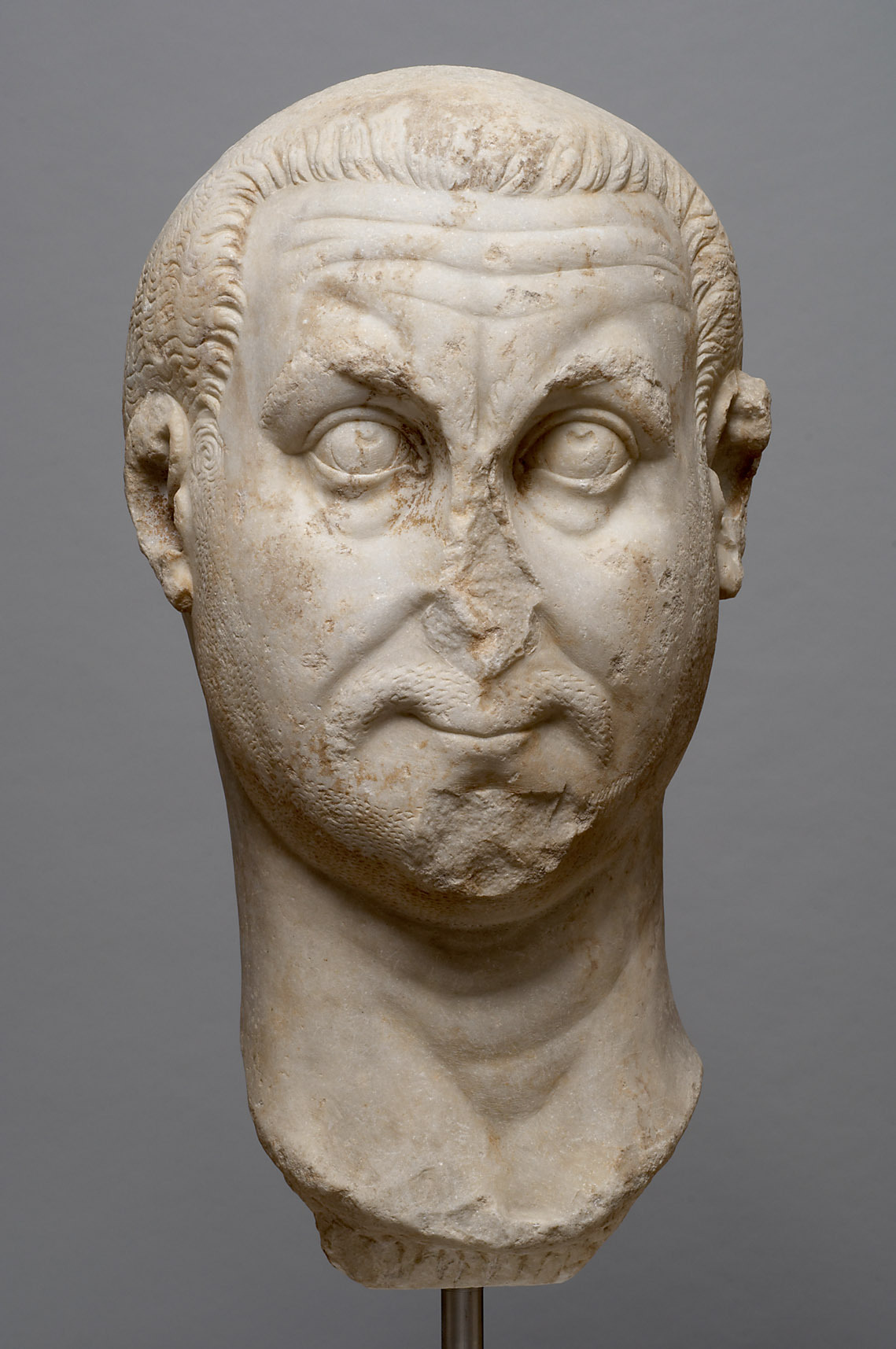
Licinius

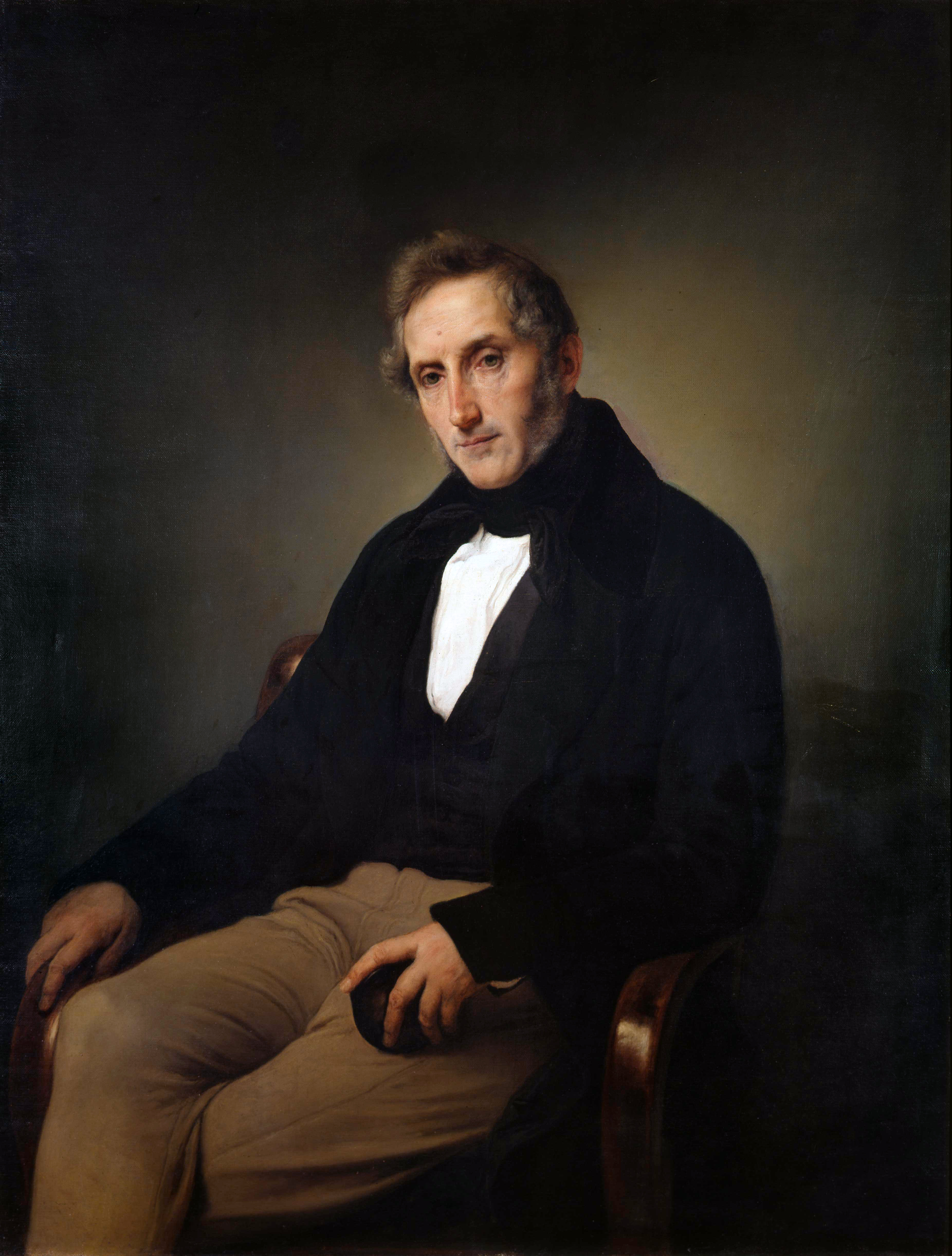
Alessandro Manzoni

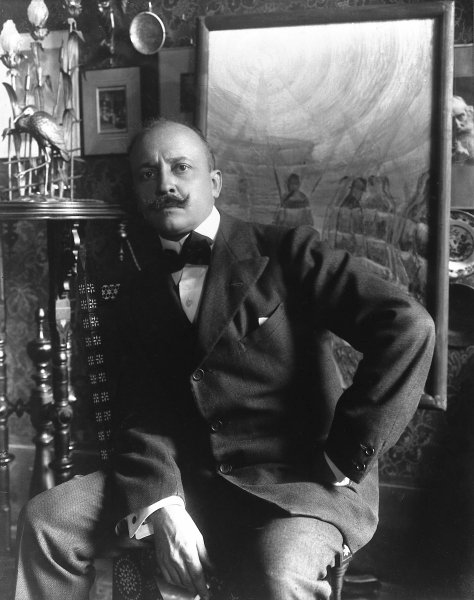
Filippo Tommaso Marinetti

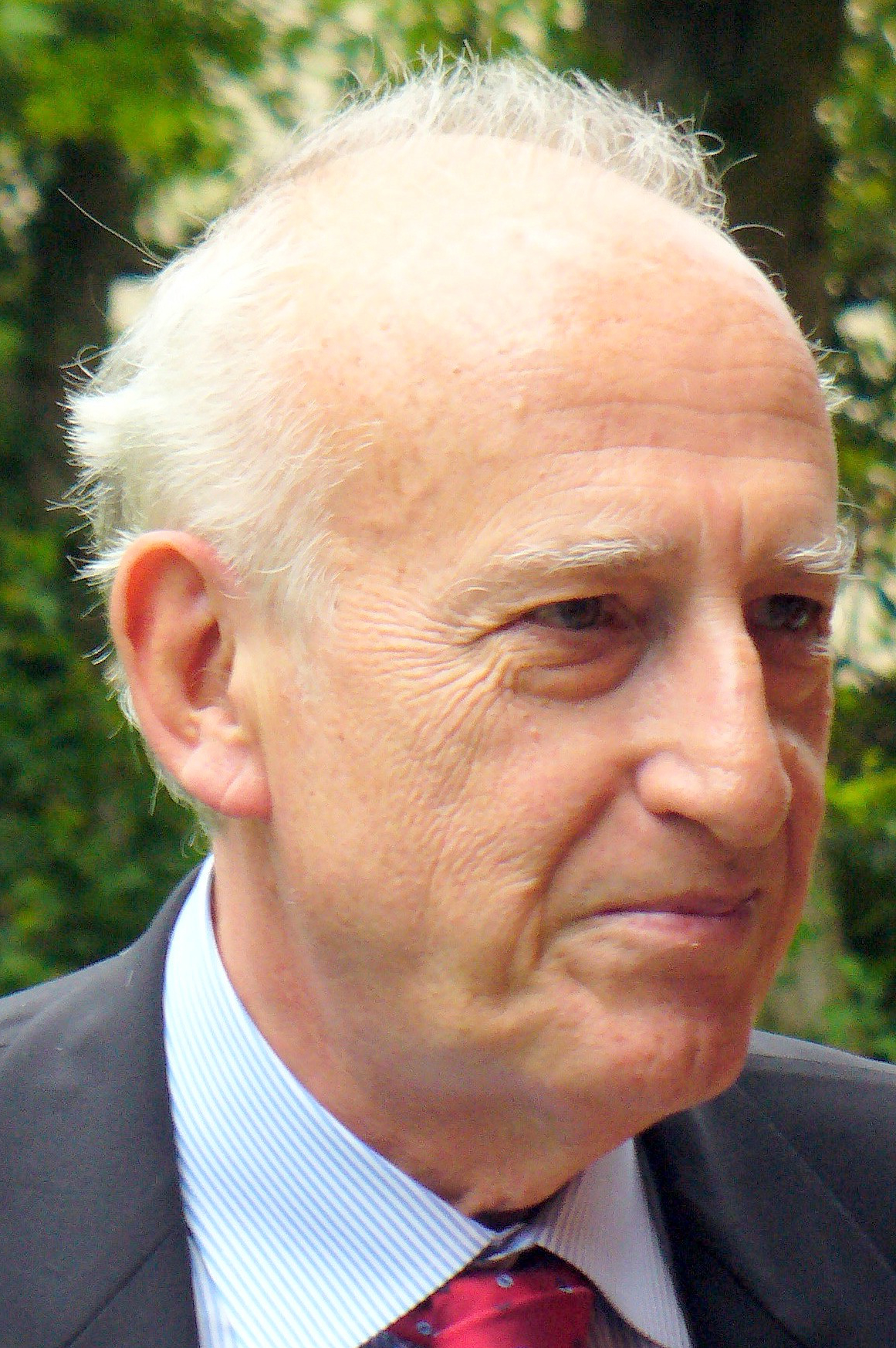
Maurizio Pollini

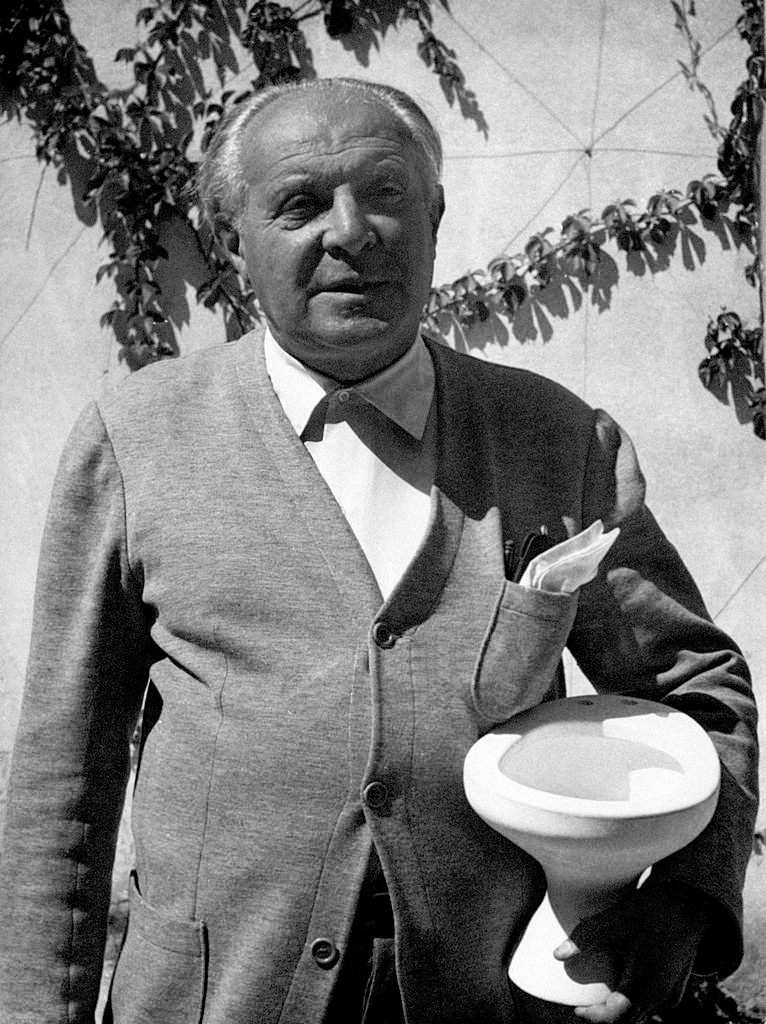
Gio Ponti

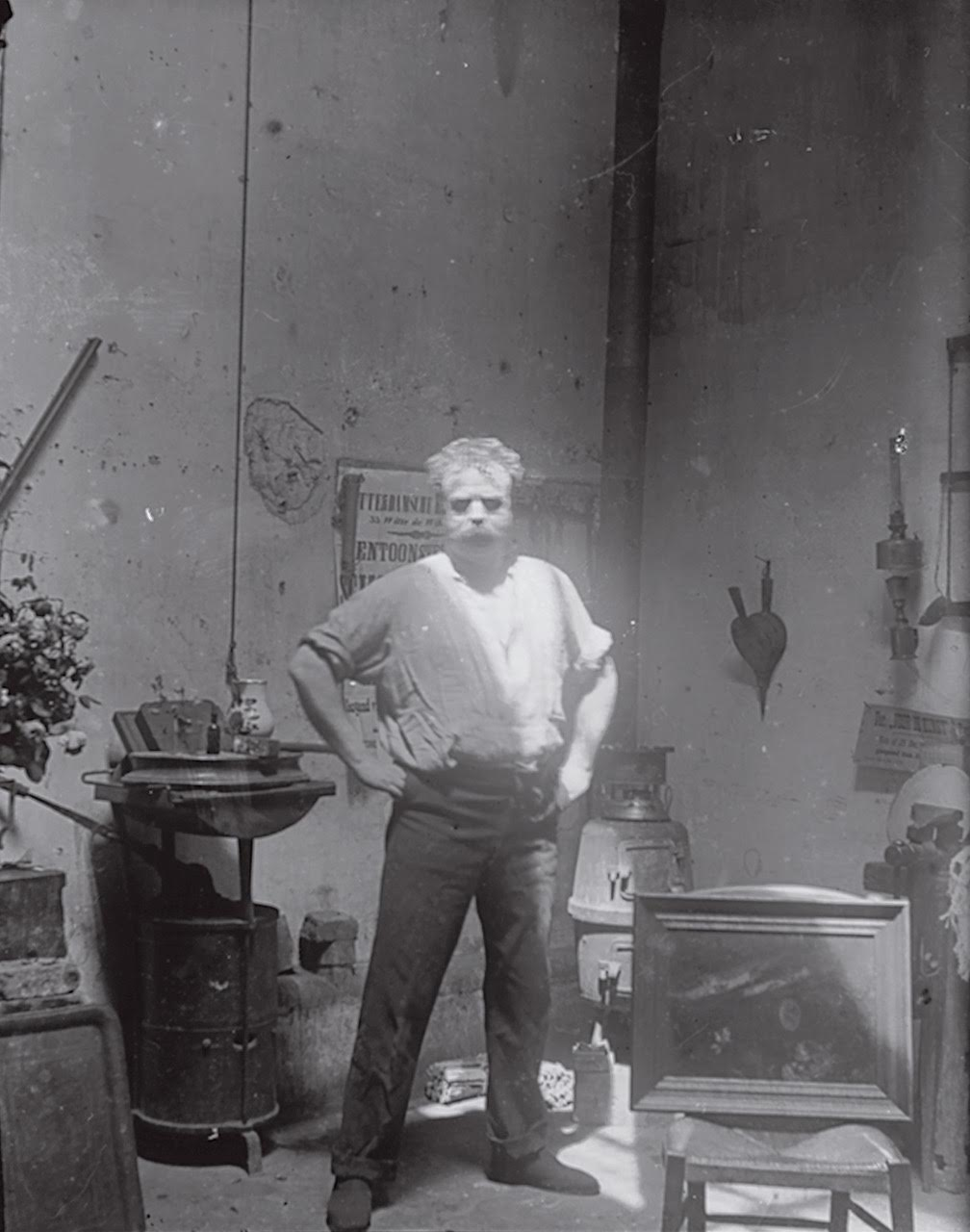
Medardo Rosso

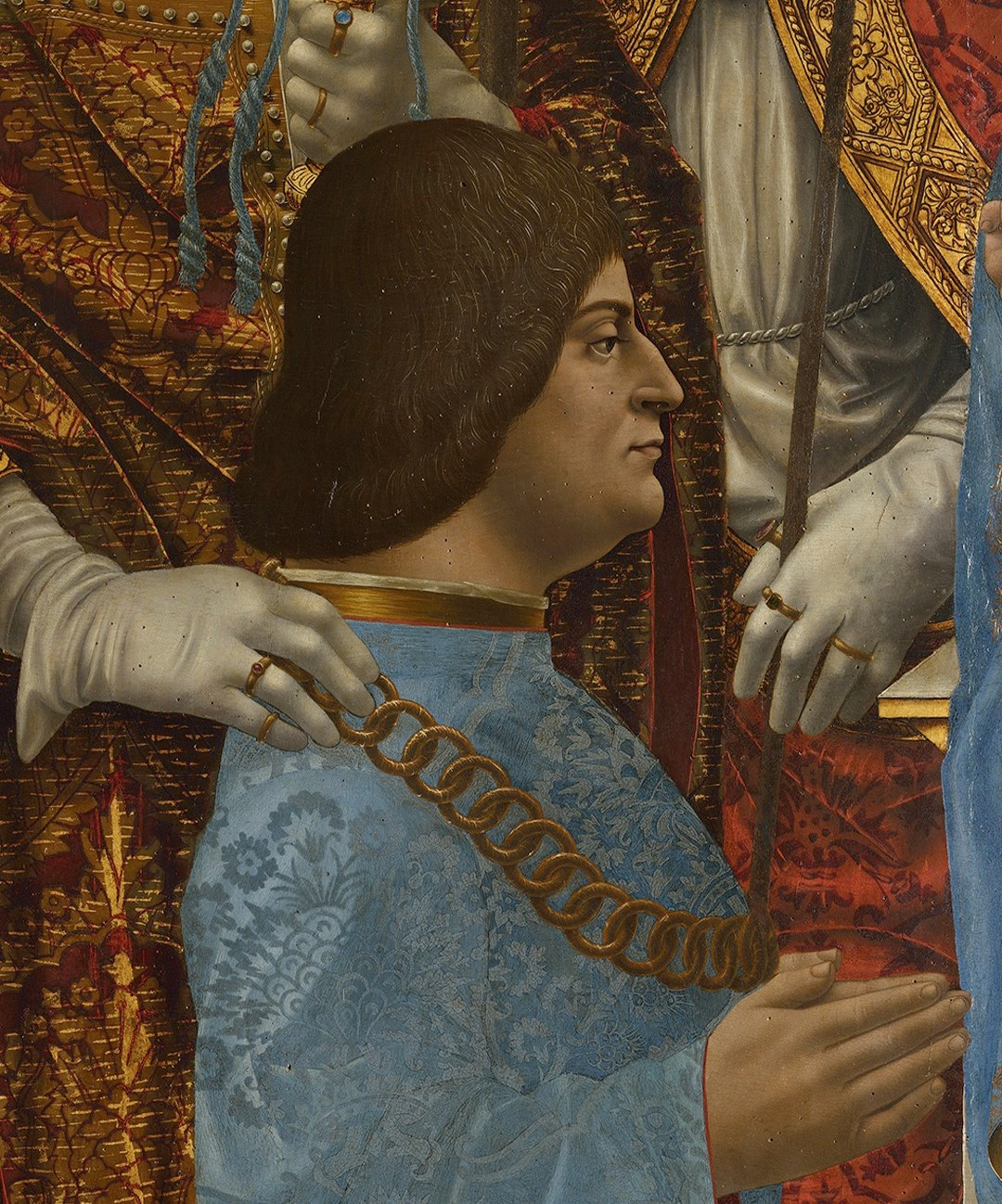
Ludovico Sforza

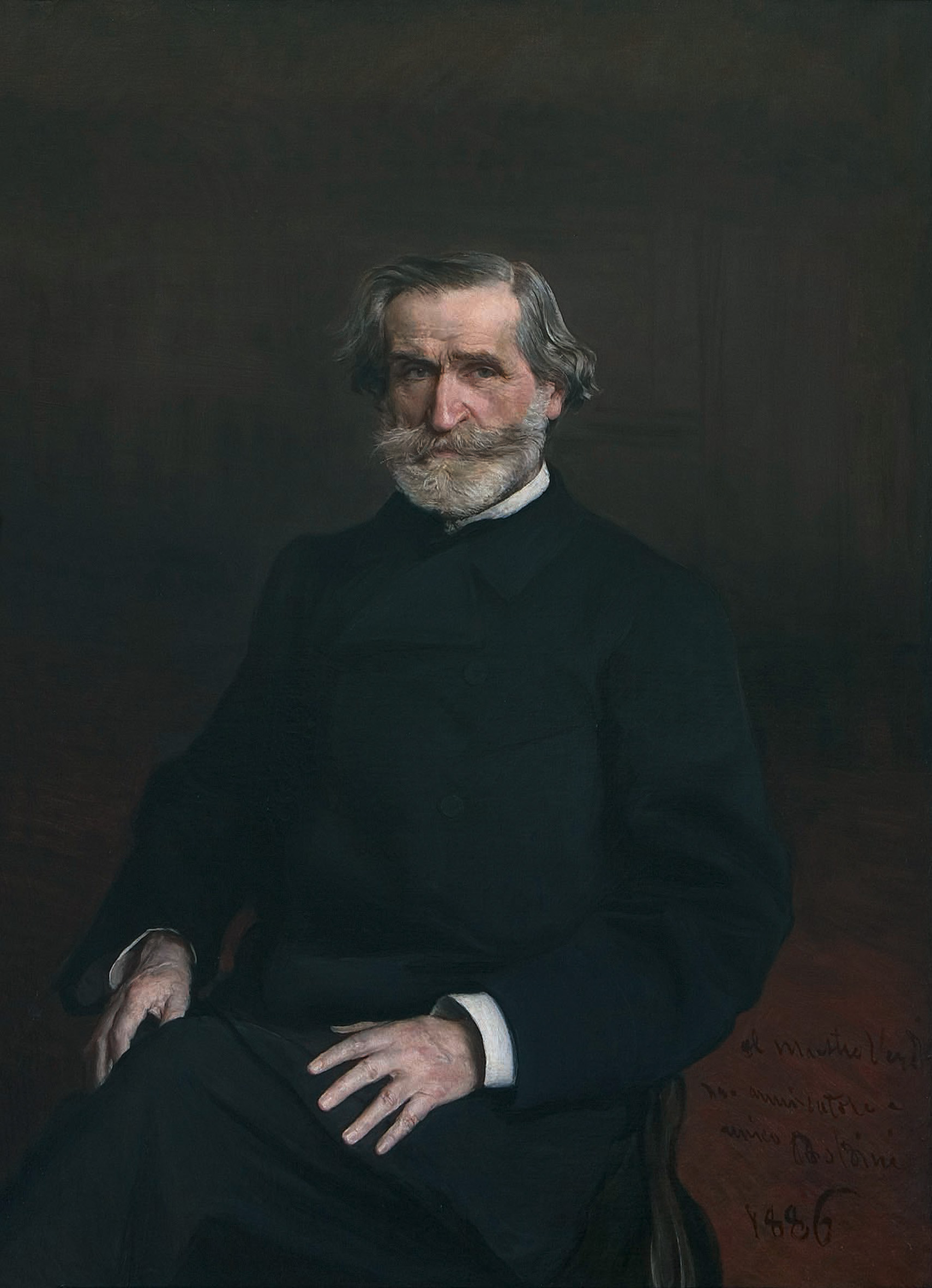
Giuseppe Verdi

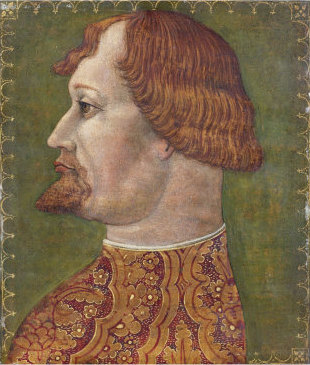
Gian Galeazzo Visconti

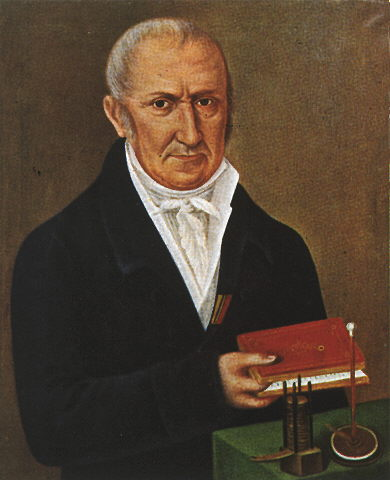
Alessandro Volta

== Entrepreneurs ==
- Ferdinando Bocconi (1836–1908), Italian entrepreneur and politician, founder of Bocconi University
- Ernesto Breda (1852–1918), Italian engineer and entrepreneur
- Davide Campari (1867–1936), businessman; born in Milan
- Federico Confalonieri (1785–1846), businessman
- Enrico Cuccia (1907–2000), banker
- Ernesto De Angeli (1849–1907), businessman and senator; he founded the Società Ernesto De Angeli e C, a textile company manufacturing cotton prints
- Carlo Erba (1811–1888), businessman and pharmacist who founded Carlo Erba SpA
- Giangiacomo Feltrinelli (1926–1972), influential Italian publisher, businessman, and political activist
- Ferdinando Innocenti (1891–1966), Italian businessman who founded the machinery–works company Innocenti and manufacturer of the Lambretta motorscooter
- Enrico Mattei (1906–1962), Italian public administrator and chairman of Eni
- Arnoldo Mondadori (1889–1971), book publisher
- Angelo Moratti (1909–1981), Italian oil tycoon and the former owner of Inter Milan from 1955 to 1968
- Massimo Moratti (born 1945), Italian billionaire petroleum businessman, the former owner of Inter Milan and chairman of the Saras Group
- Angelo Motta (1890–1957), Italian entrepreneur, and founder of the food company Motta
- Angelo Rizzoli (1889–1970), Italian publisher and film producer
- Edoardo Sonzogno (1836–1920), Italian publisher

== Fashion designers ==
- Giorgio Armani (1934–2025), Italian fashion designer
- Domenico Dolce (born 1958), Italian fashion designer and entrepreneur, founder (along with Stefano Gabbana) the luxury fashion house Dolce & Gabbana
- Mariuccia Mandelli (1925–2015), Italian fashion designer and entrepreneur
- Miuccia Prada (born 1949), fashion designer
- Stefano Gabbana, (born 1962), Italian fashion designer and perfume entrepreneurship

== Fine arts ==
=== Architects and designers ===
- Donato Felice d'Allio (1677–1761), Rococo style, worked in Austria
- Luca Beltrami (1854–1933), Italian architect and architectural historian
- Donato Bramante (1444–1514), Italian Renaissance architect and painter
- Bramantino (1456–c. 1530), Italian Renaissance architect and painter
- Filarete (c. 1400–c. 1469), Florentine Renaissance architect, sculptor, medallist, and architectural theorist
- Ignazio Gardella (1905–1999), Italian architect and designer
- Giovanni Muzio (1893–1982), Italian architect
- Giuseppe Piermarini (1734–1808), Italian architect who designed the Teatro alla Scala
- Gino Pollini (1903–1991), Italian architect
- Gio Ponti (1891–1979), Italian architect, industrial designer, furniture designer, artist, teacher, writer and publisher
- Aldo Rossi (1931–1997), Italian architect and designer, one of the leading proponents of the postmodern movement, laureate of the Pritzker Prize in 1990
- Ettore Sottsass (1917–2007), Italian architect and designer
- Giuseppe Terragni (1904–1943), Italian architect, pioneer of the Italian modern movement under the rubric of Rationalism
- Marco Zanuso (1916–2001), Italian Modernist architect and designer

=== Painters ===
- Filippo Abbiati (1640–1715)
- Mario Acerbi (painter) (1887–1982)
- Angelo Achini (1850–1930)
- Franz Adam (1815–1886)
- Luigi Ademollo (1764–1849)
- Giuseppe Arcimboldo (1526–1593), Italian painter best known for creating imaginative portrait heads made entirely of objects such as fruits, vegetables, flowers, fish and books
- Carlo Paolo Agazzi (1870–1922)
- Federico Agnelli (1626–1702), engraver
- Leonardo di Bisuccio (15th century), Italian painter of the Renaissance period
- Umberto Boccioni (1882–1916), Italian Futurist painter and sculptor
- Caravaggio (1571–1610), Italian painter
- Carlo Carrà (1881–1966), Italian Futurist painter
- Giorgio de Chirico (1888–1978), Italian painter and writer
- Dadamaino (1930–2004), painter
- Leonardo da Vinci (1452–1519), Italian polymath of the High Renaissance who was active as a painter, draughtsman, engineer, scientist, theorist, sculptor, and architect
- Filippo De Pisis (1896–1956), Italian painter and poet
- Claudio Detto (born 1950), Italian contemporary art painter
- Lucio Fontana (1899–1968), Argentine–Italian painter, sculptor and theorist
- Vincenzo Foppa (c. 1427–1430–c. 1515–1516), Italian Renaissance painter
- Francesco Hayez (1791–1882), Italian painter
- Bruno Munari (1907–1998), artist, designer
- Giorgio Salmoiraghi (1936–2022)
- Alberto Savinio (1891–1952), Greek–Italian writer, painter, musician, journalist, essayist, playwright, set designer and composer
- Giovanni Segantini (1858–1899), Italian painter
- Mario Sironi (1885–1961), Italian Modernist artist who active as a painter, sculptor, illustrator, and designer
- Saul Steinberg (1914–1999), American artist
- Guglielmo Stella (1828–1888), painter and writer
- Luigi Veronesi (1908–1998), Italian photographer, painter, scenographer and film director
- Bernardino Zenale (c. 1460–1526), Italian painter and architect

=== Photographers ===
- Gabriele Basilico (1944–2013)
- Fabio Ponzio (born 1959)
- Oliviero Toscani (1942–2025)

=== Sculptors ===
- Antonio Canova (1757–1822), Italian Neoclassical sculptor
- Mario Merz (1925–2003), sculptor
- Arnaldo Pomodoro (1926–2025), sculptor
- Gio Pomodoro (1930–2002), sculptor
- Medardo Rosso (1858–1928), Italian post–Impressionist sculptor
- Adolfo Wildt (1868–1931), Italian sculptor

== Literature and historians ==
- Joseph Allegranza (1715–1785)
- Cesare Beccaria (1738–1794), Italian criminologist, jurist, philosopher, economist and politician
- Giovanni Berchet (1783–1851), Italian poet and patriot
- Enzo Biagi (1920–2007), Italian journalist, writer and former partisan
- Luciano Bianciardi (1922–1971), Italian journalist, translator and writer of short stories and novels
- Giorgio Bocca (1920–2011), Italian essayist and journalist
- Valentino Bompiani (1898–1992), Italian publisher, writer and playwright
- Alfredo Bracchi (1897–1976), versatile Italian writer
- Gianni Brera (1919–1992), Italian sports journalist and novelist
- Cesare Cantù (1804–1895), Italian historian, writer, archivist and politician
- Carlo Cattaneo (1801–1869), Italian philosopher, writer, and activist
- Enrica Collotti Pischel (1930–2003), Marxist historian specializing in Asia
- Adelaide Coari (1881–1966), Italian journalist, activist, and teacher
- Una Chi (1942–2021), Italian translator and writer
- Ottavio Codogno (1570/74–1630), author of a guidebook to the postal services of early 17th–century Europe
- Bernardino Corio (1459–1519?), historian, author of the Storia di Milano
- Vincenzo Cuoco (1770–1823), Italian writer
- Ivan Della Mea (1940–2009), Italian novelist, journalist, singer, songwriter and political activist
- Carlo Dossi (1849–1910), Italian writer, politician and diplomat
- Francesco Filelfo (1398–1481), Italian Renaissance humanist
- Dario Fo (1926–2016), Italian playwright, actor, theatre director, stage designer, songwriter, political campaigner for the Italian left wing and the recipient of the 1997 Nobel Prize in Literature
- Carlo Emilio Gadda (1893–1973), Italian writer and poet
- Brunella Gasperini (1918–1979), Italian journalist and novelist
- Melchiorre Gioia (1767–1829), Italian writer on philosophy and political economy
- Julien Green (1900–1998), American writer
- Tommaso Grossi (1791–1853), Italian poet and novelist
- Umberto Eco (1932–2016), Italian medievalist, philosopher, semiotician, novelist, cultural critic, and political and social commentator
- Clara Maffei (1814–1886), Italian woman of letters and backer of the Risorgimento
- Carlo Maria Maggi (1630–1699), Italian scholar, writer and poet
- Alessandro Manzoni (1785–1873), Italian poet, novelist and philosopher
- Filippo Tommaso Marinetti (1876–1944), Italian poet, editor, art theorist, and founder of the Futurist movement
- Eugenio Montale (1896–1981), Italian poet, prose writer, editor and translator, and recipient of the 1975 Nobel Prize in Literature
- Indro Montanelli (1909–2001), Italian journalist, historian, and writer
- Vincenzo Monti (1754–1828), Italian poet, playwright, translator, and scholar
- Salvatore Quasimodo (1901–1968), Italian poet and translator, laureate of the Nobel Prize in Literature in 1959
- Giuseppe Parini (1729–1799), Italian enlightenment satirist and poet of the neoclassic period
- Silvio Pellico (1789–1854), Italian writer, poet, dramatist and patriot active in the Italian unification
- Francesco Petrarca (1304–1374), scholar and poet of the early Italian Renaissance, and one of the earliest humanists
- Carlo Porta (1775–1821), Italian poet
- Bonvesin da la Riva (c. 1240–c. 1313), Italian Medieval writer and poet
- Giuseppe Rovani (1818–1874), Italian novelist and essayist
- Alberto Savinio (1891–1952), Greek–Italian writer, painter, musician, journalist, essayist, playwright, set designer and composer
- Beppe Severgnini (born 1956), Italian journalist, essayist and columnist
- Stendhal (1783–1842), 19th–century French writer
- Carlo Tenca (1816–1883), Italian man of letters, journalist, deputy and supporter of the Risorgimento
- Delio Tessa (1886–1939), Italian poet
- Leo Valiani (1909–1999), Italian historian, politician, and journalist
- Alessandro Verri (1741–1816), Italian author
- Pietro Verri (1728–1797), Italian economist, historian, philosopher and writer
- Elio Vittorini (1908–1966), Italian writer and novelist

== Media ==
=== Actors/Actresses of Film, Theatre and TV ===
- Diego Abatantuono (born 1955)
- Cele Abba (1906–1992)
- Marta Abba (1900–1988)
- Gino Bramieri (1928–1996), Italian comedian and actor
- Nino Castelnuovo (1936–2021), Italian actor
- Valentina Cortese (1923–2019), Italian film and theatre actress
- Fabio Lanzoni (born 1959), Italian actor and model
- Mariangela Melato (1941–2013), award-winning Italian film and theater actress
- Marco Lui (born 1975), mime and comedian
- Tino Scotti (1905–1984), Italian film actor
- Franca Valeri (1920–2020), Italian actress, playwright, screenwriter, author, and theatre director
- María de Navas (1678–1721), actress
- Carlo Bonomi (1937–2022), Italian voice actor

=== Directors and filmmakers ===
- Michelangelo Antonioni (1912–2007), Italian director and filmmaker
- Tinto Brass (born 1933), Italian film director and screenwriter
- Axel Braun (born 1966), adult film producer and director
- Attilio Colonello (1930–2021), scenic designer and stage director for opera
- Paolo Grassi (1919–1981), Italian theatrical impresario
- Gabriele Salvatores (born 1950), Italian Academy Award–winning film director and screenwriter
- Giorgio Strehler (1921–1997), Italian stage director, theatre practitioner, actor and politician

=== TV and radio presenter ===
- Lucilla Agosti (born 1978), television and radio presenter and actress
- Mike Bongiorno (1924–2009), Italian–American television presenter
- Rebecca Staffelli (born 1998), television presenter, radio personality and model
- Valerio Staffelli (born 1963), journalist and television personality

=== Internet Celebrity ===
- PANDA BOI, Italian internet celebrity

== Musicians ==
=== Composers ===
- Arrigo Boito (1842–1918), Italian librettist, composer, poet and critic
- Pietro Mascagni (1863–1945), Italian composer primarily known for his operas
- Pino Presti (born 1943) Italian bassist, arranger, composer, conductor and record producer
- Giuseppe Verdi (1813–1901), Italian composer best known for his operas

=== Pianists ===
- Marcello Abbado (1926–2020)
- Maria Teresa Agnesi Pinottini (1720–1795), harpsichordist
- Maurizio Pollini (born 1942), pianist

=== Singers ===
- Manuel Agnelli (born 1966), alternative rock, member of the band Afterhours
- Ghigo Agosti (1936–2024), also comedy rock
- Teresa Berganza (1933–2022), Spanish mezzo–soprano
- Maria Callas (1923–1977), opera singer
- Adriano Celentano (born 1938), singer, songwriter, actor, and filmmaker
- Giovanni D'Anzi (1906–1974), musician
- Emilio De Marchi (1861–1917), Italian operatic tenor
- Eugenio Finardi (born 1952), Italian rock singer, songwriter, guitarist and keyboardist
- Renato Fumagalli (born 1945), Italian singer/songwriter, guitarist, and actor
- Giorgio Gaber (1939–2003), musician, actor
- Enzo Jannacci (1935–2013), Italian singer–songwriter, pianist, actor and comedian
- Carmelo La Bionda (1949–2022), one of the pioneers of italo disco
- Michelangelo La Bionda (born 1952), one of the pioneers of italo disco
- Mahmood (born 1992), singer–songwriter
- Mina (born 1940), singer
- Laura Pausini (born 1974), singer
- Alberto Rabagliati (1906–1974), jazz singer
- Cristina Scabbia (born 1972), singer of Lacuna Coil
- Renata Tebaldi (1922–2004), lirico–spinto soprano
- Rose Villain (born 1989), singer-songwriter and rapper
- Ornella Vanoni (1934–2025), singer

=== Orchestral conductors ===
- Claudio Abbado (1933–2014)
- Roberto Abbado (born 1954)
- Riccardo Chailly (born 1953)
- Victor de Sabata (1892–1967), Italian conductor and composer
- Riccardo Muti (born 1941), Italian conductor
- Pino Presti (born 1943)
- Arturo Toscanini (1867–1957)

== Politicians ==
- Vittorio Agnoletto (born 1958), (Communist Refoundation Party), member of the European Parliament
- Luigi Albertini (1871–1941)
- Alboinus (530s–572), king of the Lombards from about 560 until 572
- Eugène de Beauharnais (1781–1824), Viceroy of Italy during the Napoleonic Kingdom of Italy, whose capital was Milan
- Bellovesus (lived ca. 600 BC), legendary Gallic chief of the Bituriges
- Silvio Berlusconi (1936–2023), Italian politician who served as Prime Minister of Italy in four governments
- Adelaide Coari (1881–1966), feminist, editor, trade unionist, teacher and social activist
- Felice Cavallotti (1842–1898), Italian politician, poet and dramatic author
- Bettino Craxi (1934–2000), Italian politician, leader of the Italian Socialist Party from 1976 to 1993 and Prime Minister of Italy from 1983 to 1987
- Cesare Correnti (1815–1888), Italian revolutionary and politician
- Emilio Dandolo (1830–1859), important figure in the Italian Risorgimento
- Diocletianus (242/245–311/312), Roman emperor from 284 until his abdication in 305
- Beatrice d'Este (1475–1497) was Duchess of Bari and Milan by marriage to Ludovico Sforza
- Alberto da Giussano (12th century), legendary character who would have participated, as a protagonist, in the battle of Legnano on 29 May 1176
- Anna Kuliscioff (1857–1925), Russian–born Italian revolutionary, a prominent feminist, an anarchist
- Ugo La Malfa (1903–1979), Italian politician and an important leader of the Italian Republican Party
- Licinius (c. 265–325) was Roman emperor from 308 to 324, who co–authored the Edict of Milan
- Giovanni Malagodi (1904–1991), Italian liberal politician, secretary of the Italian Liberal Party (Partito Liberale Italiano; PLI), and president of the Italian Senate
- Francesco Melzi d'Eril (1753–1816), Italian politician and patriot, serving as vice–president of the Napoleonic Italian Republic (1802–1805)
- Teresa Meroni (1885–1951), trade unionist, and socialist
- Cesare Merzagora (1898–1991), Italian politician
- Mario Monti (born 1943), Italian economist who served as the Prime Minister of Italy from 2011 to 2013
- Letizia Moratti (born 1949), Italian businesswoman and politician, president of RAI (1994–1996), minister of Education, University and Research (2001–2006), mayor of Milan (2006–2011)
- Ferruccio Parri (1890–1981), Italian partisan, anti–fascist politician and the first Prime Minister of Italy to be appointed after the end of World War II
- Giuseppe Prina (1766–1814), Italian statesman killed in the Milan riots of 1814
- Gianni Rivera (born 1943), Italian politician and former footballer
- Claudia Ruggerini (1922–2016), Italian Communist activist and neuropsychiatrist
- Matteo Salvini (born 1973), politician
- Francesco I Sforza (1401–1466), and Duke of Milan from 1450 until his death, the first member of the Sforza family to rule Milan
- Francesco II Sforza (1495–1535) was Duke of Milan from 1521 until his death, the last member of the Sforza family to rule Milan
- Ludovico Sforza (1452–1508), Italian nobleman who ruled as the Duke of Milan from 1494 to 1499
- Massimiliano Sforza (1493–1530), Duke of Milan from 1512 to 1515
- Gian Giacomo Trivulzio (1440 or 1441–1518), Italian aristocrat and condottiero
- Filippo Turati (1857–1932), Italian sociologist, criminologist, poet and socialist politician
- Umberto Veronesi (1925–2016), Italian oncologist, physician, scientist and politician
- Agnese Visconti (1363–1391), consort of Francesco I Gonzaga Lord of Mantua
- Bernabò Visconti (1323–1385), Italian soldier and statesman who was Lord of Milan
- Filippo Maria Visconti (1392–1447), duke of Milan from 1412 to 1447
- Gian Galeazzo Visconti (1351–1402), first duke of Milan from 1395 to 1402
- Luchino Visconti (1906–1976), Italian filmmaker, theatre and opera director, and screenwriter
- Matteo Visconti (1250–1322), second of the Milanese Visconti family to govern Milan
- Ottone Visconti (1207–1295) was Archbishop of Milan and Lord of Milan, the first of the Visconti line

== Religious figures ==
- Alberto Ablondi (1924–2010)
- Ferdinando d'Adda (1650–1719), cardinal of San Clemente, San Pietro in Vincoli, Santa Balbina and Albano, archbishop of Amasya and apostolic nuncio to Great Britain
- Aicone (died 918), archbishop of Milan
- Saint Ambrose (c. 339–397), Bishop of Milan from 374 to 397
- Anspert (died 881), archbishop of Milan from 861 to 881
- Aribert (between 970 and 980–1045), archbishop of Milan from 1018
- Arnulf I, Archbishop of Milan (died 974)
- Arnulf II, Archbishop of Milan (died 1018)
- Arnulf III, Archbishop of Milan (died 1097)
- Carlo Acutis (1991–2006), lay Catholic teenager, set to be the first canonized millennial in the Catholic church
- Saint Augustine (354–430), theologian and philosopher of Berber origin and the bishop of Hippo Regius in Numidia, Roman North Africa
- Saint Charles Borromeo (1538–1584), Archbishop of Milan from 1564 to 1584 and a cardinal of the Catholic Church
- Federico Borromeo (1564–1631), Italian cardinal and Archbishop of Milan
- Landolfo da Carcano (died 998), archbishop of Milan, as Landulf II, from 979 until his death
- Saint Galdinus (c. 1096–1176), cardinal elevated in 1165 and Archbishop of Milan from 1166 to his death in 1176
- Saint Gervasius (2nd century AD), Christian martyr
- Luigi Giussani (1922–2005), Italian Catholic priest, theologian, educator
- Carlo Maria Martini (1927–2012), Italian Jesuit, cardinal of the Catholic Church and Archbishop of Milan from 1980 to 2004
- Samuel Charles Mazzuchelli (1806–1864), pioneer Italian Dominican friar and Catholic missionary priest who helped bring the church to the Iowa–Illinois–Wisconsin tri–state area
- Giovan Battista Montini (1897–1978), Pope Paul VI from 21 June 1963 to his death in August 1978)
- Saint Protasius (2nd century AD), Christian martyr
- Ildefonso Schuster (1880–1954), Archbishop of Milan from 1929 until his death

== Scientists ==
- Marco Abate (born 1962)
- Maria Gaetana Agnesi (1718–1799), the world's first woman to write a mathematics handbook and the first woman appointed as a mathematics professor at a university, wrote the first book discussing both differential and integral calculus
- Camillo Agrippa (1535–1595), is considered to be one of the greatest fencing theorists of all time
- Enrico Bombieri (born 1940), Italian mathematician
- Ruggero Giuseppe Boscovich (1711–1787), physicist, astronomer, mathematician, philosopher, diplomat, poet, theologian, Jesuit priest, and a polymath from the Republic of Ragusa
- Piero Bottoni
- Francesco Brioschi (1824–1897), Italian mathematician
- Eugenio Calabi (1923–2023)
- Gianni Caproni (1886–1957), Italian aeronautical engineer, civil engineer, electrical engineer, and aircraft designer
- Girolamo Cardano (1501–1576), Italian polymath
- Panfilo Castaldi (c. 1398–c. 1490), Italian physician and printer
- Bonaventura Cavalieri (1598–1647)
- Giuseppe Ciribini (1913–1990), engineer
- Giuseppe Colombo (1920–1984), Italian scientist, mathematician and engineer
- Ardito Desio (1897–2001), Italian explorer, mountain climber, geologist, and cartographer
- Enrico Forlanini (1848–1930), Italian engineer, inventor and aeronautical pioneer
- Paolo Frisi (1728–1784), Italian mathematician and astronomer
- Agostino Gemelli (1878–1959), Italian Franciscan friar, physician and psychologist
- Ludovico Geymonat (1908–1991), Italian mathematician, philosopher and historian of science
- Riccardo Giacconi (1931–2018), Italian–American Nobel Prize–winning astrophysicist
- Pier Luigi Ighina (1908–2004), Italian researcher
- Giulio Natta (1903–1979), Italian chemical engineer and laureate of a Nobel Prize in Chemistry in 1963
- Giovanni Schiaparelli (1835–1910), Italian astronomer and science historian
- Cicco Simonetta (1410–1480), Italian Renaissance statesman who composed an early treatise on cryptography
- Antonio Stoppani (1824–1891), Italian Catholic priest, patriot, geologist and palaeontologist
- Enzo Tonti (1935–2021), Italian physicist and mathematician
- Alessandro Volta (1745–1827), Italian physicist and chemist, pioneer of electricity and power

== Sport ==
=== Footballers ===
- Camillo Achilli (1921–1998), football player and coach
- Marco Achilli (1948–2009), football player, one–time Italian Serie A champion
- Ermanno Aebi (1892–1976), football player and referee, two–time Italian Serie A champion
- Enrico Annoni (born 1966), footballer
- Franco Baresi (1960–2026), Italian football youth team coach and a former player and manager
- Giuseppe Baresi (born 1958), Italian football manager and former player
- Giuseppe Bergomi (born 1963), Italian former professional footballer who spent his entire career at Inter Milan
- Aurelio Biassoni (1912–?)
- Massimo Brambati (born 1966), Italian former footballer
- Tito Celani (1921–1990), football player
- Mario Ciminaghi (1910–?), football player
- Renzo De Vecchi (1894–1967), Italian football player and coach
- Giulia Dragoni (born 2006), football player for the Italy national team
- Giacinto Facchetti (1942–2006), Italian footballer, football player
- Luciano Gariboldi (1927–1988), football player
- Alessio Locatelli (born 1978), football player
- Leonida Lucchetta (1911–?), football player
- Paolo Maldini (born 1968), footballer
- Roberto Manini (born 1942), football player
- Valentino Mazzola (1919–1949), footballer
- Giuseppe Meazza (1910–1979), Italian football manager and player
- Giuseppe Mettica (1919–2003), football player
- Egidio Notaristefano (born 1966), Italian football manager
- Roberto Poluzzi (born 1936), retired professional football player
- Michele Rocca (born 1996), footballer
- Aldo Riva (1923–?), football player
- Walter Zenga (born 1960), Italian football manager

=== Ice hockey ===
- Giancarlo Agazzi (1932–1995), ice hockey player, coach and president, six–time Italian Serie A champion and two–time Spengler Cup champion

=== Olympic sports ===
- Carlo Agostoni (1909–1972), épée, one–time Olympic champion and one–time world champion
- Alessandro Aimar (born 1967), sprint

=== Racing drivers ===
- Michele Alboreto (1956–2001), racing driver
- Alberto Ascari (1918–1955), racing driver and a two time Formula One World Champion
- Cristian Bertuca (born 2006), racing driver
- Ivan Capelli (born 1963), Formula One driver
- Stefano Gai (born 1985), racing driver
- Madusa (born 1963), monster truck driver, professional wrestler

== See also ==
- List of Italian people
- List of governors of the Duchy of Milan
- List of mayors of Milan
- List of Milanese consorts
- List of Milanese painters
- List of rulers of Milan
