= Agazzi =

Agazzi is an Italian surname and a name of a village near Arezzo. Notable people with the surname include:

- Davide Agazzi (born 1993), Italian footballer
- Carlo Paolo Agazzi (1870–1922), Italian painter
- Ermenegildo Agazzi (1866–1945), Italian painter
- Ernesto Agazzi (born 1942), Uruguayan agronomist and politician
- Evandro Agazzi (born 1934), Italian philosopher
- Giancarlo Agazzi (1932–1995), Italian ice hockey player
- Michael Agazzi (born 1984), Italian footballer
- Paolo Agazzi (born 1946), Italian-born Bolivian director
- Rinaldo Agazzi (1857–1939), Italian painter
- Agazzi (Arezzo), Italian village near Arezzo
- Emilio Agazzi (born 1983), Argentinian-born film director & Actor.
