= Poluzzi =

Poluzzi is an Italian surname. Notable people with the surname include:

- Giacomo Poluzzi (born 1988), Italian footballer
- Roberto Poluzzi (born 1936), Italian football player
