= Ermenegildo =

Ermenegildo is the Italian form of the given name Hermenegild. It may refer to:

- Ermenegildo Agazzi (1866–1945), Italian painter
- Ermenegildo Arena (1921–2005), Italian water polo player and swimmer
- Ermenegildo Costantini (1731–1791), Italian painter
- Ermenegildo Florit (1901–1985), Italian Roman Catholic cardinal
- Ermenegildo Gasperoni (1906–1994), Sammarinese politician
- Ermenegildo Luppi (1877–1937), Italian sculptor
- Ermenegildo Pellegrinetti (1876–1943), Italian Cardinal of the Roman Catholic Church
- Ermenegildo Pini (1739–1825), Italian clergyman, naturalist, mathematician, geologist and philosopher
- Ermenegildo Pistelli (1862–1927), Italian papyrologist and palaeographer
- Ermenegildo Zegna Group, an Italian luxury fashion house
  - Ermenegildo Zegna (fashion entrepreneur) (born 1955), its current chairman
- Giuseppe Antonio Ermenegildo Prisco (1833–1923), Italian Cardinal of the Roman Catholic Church

== See also ==
- Hermenengildo Gildo Mahones (1929–2018), American jazz pianist
