= Biassoni =

Biassoni is an Italian surname. Notable people with the surname include:

- Aurelio Biassoni (1912–?), Italian footballer
- Marco Biassoni (1930–2002), Italian cartoonist, humorist, and filmmaker
