= Gli Spioni =

Italian beat group

- Origin: Milan, Italy
- Genres: Beat Music
- Years active: 1965–1967
- Labels: LSDischi
- Past members: Renato Fumagalli; Lippo Artusi; Artemide Palafrenieri; Franco Cisti

Gli Spioni (Italian for "The Telltales") were an Italian beat group of the 1960s.

== Biography ==
The group was formed in Milan in 1965. The original members were Renato Fumagalli (vocals, guitar), Lippo Artusi (guitar), Artemide Palafrenieri (bass) and Franco Cisti (drums). In early 1966, they were signed by LSDischi and they quickly released their first single "Mondo capellone" ("Hippie World"). "Mondo capellone" entered the Cantagiro music contest in the summer of 1966 and was a big success.

The band followed up with their first and only full-length album, In un mondo capellone ("In a Hippie World"), and a new 7" single, Il più bel giorno ("The Most Beautiful Day").

In November 1966, one more single was released from the album, Selvaggia ("Wild"), which was also the last release from the band.

The group disbanded in 1967 due to internal disagreements over the musical direction of the band. Fumagalli and Cisti later formed a new band, I Capelloni.

== Discography ==
=== Official studio albums ===
- In Un Mondo Capellone (1966)

=== Singles ===
- "Mondo capellone"/"La vera identità" (1966)
- "Il più bel giorno"/"Perso in un trip" (1966)
- "Selvaggia" (1966)

== Band members ==
- Renato Fumagalli – lead vocals, guitar (1965-1967)
- Lippo Artusi – rhythm guitar (1965-1967)
- Artemide Palafrenieri – bass guitar (1965-1967)
- Franco Cisti – drums (1965-1967)
