= Hermenegild (given name) =

Hermenegild is a Germanic given name, originally Gothic Ermengild (meaning "immense treasure"). Its most famous bearer was the Visigothic prince Hermenegild, who was later canonised by the Catholic Church. The Spanish and Portuguese form of the name, Hermenegildo, has been popular. The French form is Herménégilde. The names Menendo and Melendo, once popular in Spain, were derived from Hermenegildo, like Mendo, in Portugal. They gave rise to the patronymics Méndez, Meléndez and Menéndez in Spanish and Mendes in Portuguese.

- Hermenegild I (Bishop of Oviedo), Asturian ecclesiastic
- Hermenegild II, auxiliary bishop
- Hermenegild Jireček, Bohemian jurist
- Herménégilde Boulay, Canadian politician
- Herménégilde Chiasson, Canadian artist
- Hermenegildo Anglada Camarasa, Spanish painter
- Hermenegildo Capelo, Portuguese explorer
- Hermenegildo da Costa Paulo Bartolomeu, Angolan football (soccer) player
- Hermenegildo Portocarrero, Baron of Forte de Coimbra, Brazilian nobleman and marshal
- Hermenegildo Galeana, Mexican war hero
- Hermenegildo González, Galician count
- Hermenegildo Sábat, South American caricaturist
- Hermenegildo Villanueva, Filipino politician
- Ermenegildo Zegna, Italian luxury fashion house

== See also ==
- Ermenegildo, Italian form of the name
