= Giuseppe Mettica =

Italian footballer (1919–2003)

Personal information
- Date of birth: 26 March 1919
- Place of birth: Milan, Italy
- Date of death: 5 May 2003 (aged 84)
- Place of death: Milan, Italy
- Position: Midfielder

Senior career*
Years	Team	Apps	(Gls)
1938–1939	Ambrosiana-Inter	0	(0)
1939–1940	Bari	0	(0)
1940–1942	Fiamme Cremisi		
1942–1943	Ambrosiana-Inter	1	(0)
1945–1946	Fanfulla		
- * Club domestic league appearances and goals

Giuseppe Mettica (26 March 1919 – 5 May 2003) was an Italian professional football player.
