= Tito Celani =

Italian footballer (1921–1990)

Personal information
- Date of birth: 18 February 1921
- Place of birth: Milan, Kingdom of Italy
- Date of death: 17 January 1990 (aged 68)
- Position: Midfielder

Senior career*
Years	Team	Apps	(Gls)
1940–1941	Ambrosiana-Inter	0	(0)
1941–1943	Gallaratese		
1945–1946	Ascoli		
1946–1947	Internazionale	3	(0)
1947–1949	Lecce	77	(34)
1949–1953	Sanremese		
1953–1954	Siracusa	14	(3)
1954–1955	Annunziata Ceccano		
1955–1956	Savona	28	(17)
1956–1957	Imperia		
1957–1958	Andrea Doria 1955		
- * Club domestic league appearances and goals

Tito Celani (18 February 1921 – 17 January 1990) was an Italian professional football player.
