= Aldo Riva =

Italian footballer (born 1923)

Personal information
- Date of birth: 29 June 1923
- Place of birth: Milan, Italy
- Position: Midfielder

Senior career*
Years	Team	Apps	(Gls)
1946–1947	Montevarchi		
1947–1948	Roma	10	(0)
1948–1949	Cremonese	3	(0)
1950–1953	Sanremese		
- * Club domestic league appearances and goals

Arnaldo Riva (born 29 June 1923, date of death unknown), also known as Aldo Riva, was an Italian professional football player. Riva was born in Milan in June 1923. He played one season (1947/48) in the Serie A for A.S. Roma. Riva is deceased.
