= Ottavio Codogno =

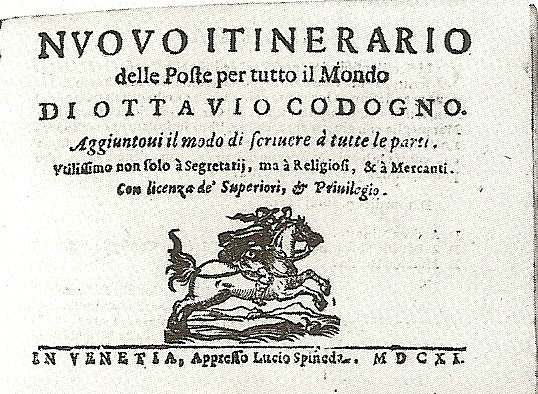

Ottavio Codogno (1570/74–1630) was deputy postmaster general of the Duchy of Milan and author of an extensive guidebook to the postal services, routes and timetables of early 17th-century Europe. His Nuovo itinerario delle Poste (Milan, 1608) went through several reprints in both Milan (1616, 1623) and Venice (1611, 1620, 1628, 1676).

The Milan 1623 edition, entitled Compendio delle poste, was divided into five books. Book one is an essay on the history and duties of postal officials, beginning with ancient Greece and Persia. The second book specifies differences in the measurement of distances (leagues and miles) and of money from one part of Europe to another. The third and most substantial book gives itineraries and the number of postal relays from one city to another. Book four provides less detailed information about the total distance from one city to another, including cities not on the postal routes and even outside Europe. Book five gives the departure days and destinations of the postal carriers from Rome, Messina, Palermo, Naples, Florence, Bologna, Mantua, Venice, Milan, Genoa, Turin, Lyon, Burgos, Madrid, Lisbon, Seville, Valencia, Barcelona, Brussels, Antwerp and Prague. Most operated on a weekly timetable, but departures for some destinations could be twice-weekly, fortnightly or monthly.
