= Giorgio Salmoiraghi =

Italian painter (1936–2022)

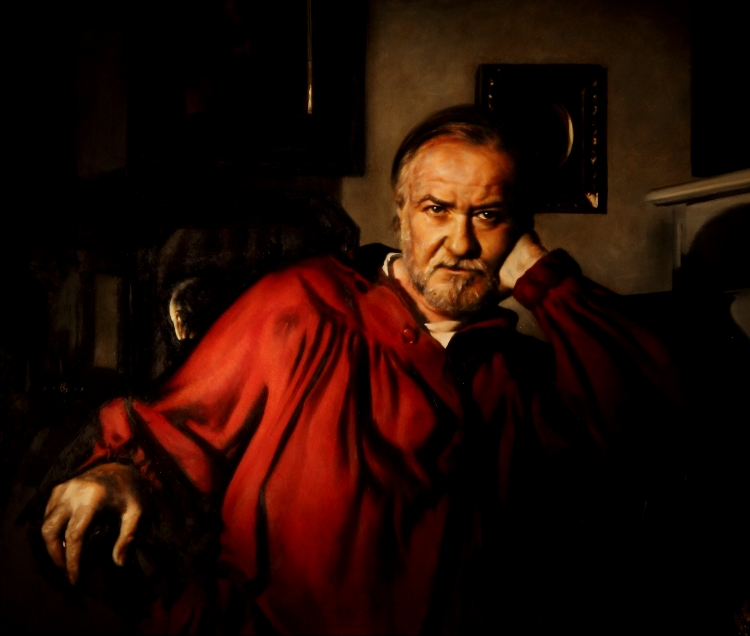
Giorgio Salmoiraghi Self-Portrait 1972

Giorgio Salmoiraghi (26 November 1936 – 27 December 2022) was an Italian painter. He was born in Milan.

Salmoiraghi graduated from the artistic High school of Brera Academy in 1955. In 1960 he was among the founders of the “Renewal of the Classical Values” together with Valmore Grazioli and Gabriele Mandel. As of 2011, he was the Editor of "Homonym Magazine" and he participated with the renovators in shows and lectures held by the movement.

In 1962, he was active in the syndical sector and he belonged to the U.S.A.I.B.A. - U.I.L. of Lombardy and he participated in and organized the first regional show at the "Museo della Scienza e della Tecnica" in Milan. He organized other art shows, including the 1964 and 1966 shows of contemporary art at "Royal Palace of Milan" and a 1969 show of contemporary art at "Royal Villa of Milan".

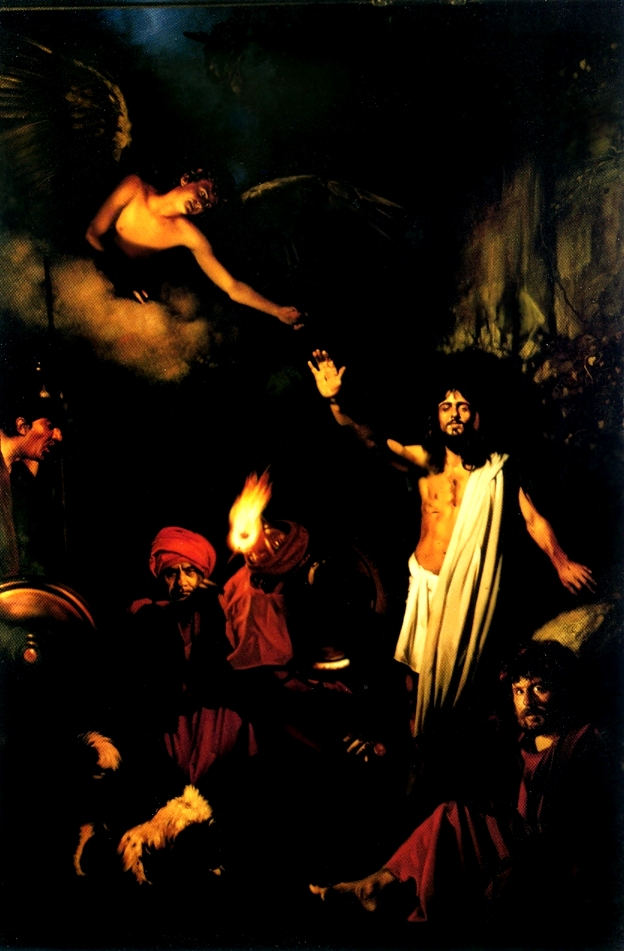
Church San Giacinto Brescia: third altarpiece "The Resurrection of Christ"

Salmoiraghi has participated in and organized different biennial exhibitions in Milan and numerous syndical shows. Salmoiraghi has been co-manager of the art magazine “Poliacos” with Valmore Grazioli and Rosalva Altini.

Salmoiraghi held personal shows, including in 1976 at the "Museo di Milano" organized by the Municipality of Milan.

In 1979 he edited a monograph from the Bank Union of Credit (BUC) of Lugano, copies of which are held in public and private libraries including the Pompidou Center in Paris.

From 1982 to 1984 he created a 9 by 4.5 metres (30 ft × 15 ft) trittico for the church of Chiesa di San Giacinto (Brescia). In 1984 the advertising of the “Barilla”, an Italian weekly magazine, hinged on Salmoiraghi. In 1986-87 he worked in the Vatican to create the portrait of John Paul II exhibited in the Palace of Saint Callixtus.

In 1990 he received the "Ambrogino d'oro" from the Municipality of Milan. In 1993 he organized a personal show at "Accademia Scalabrino" in Montecatini. In 1994 the book cooperative I.U.L.M. s.c.r.l edited Gabriele Mandel's monograph “Il magico e il sacro nell’arte di Giorgio Salmoiraghi”.

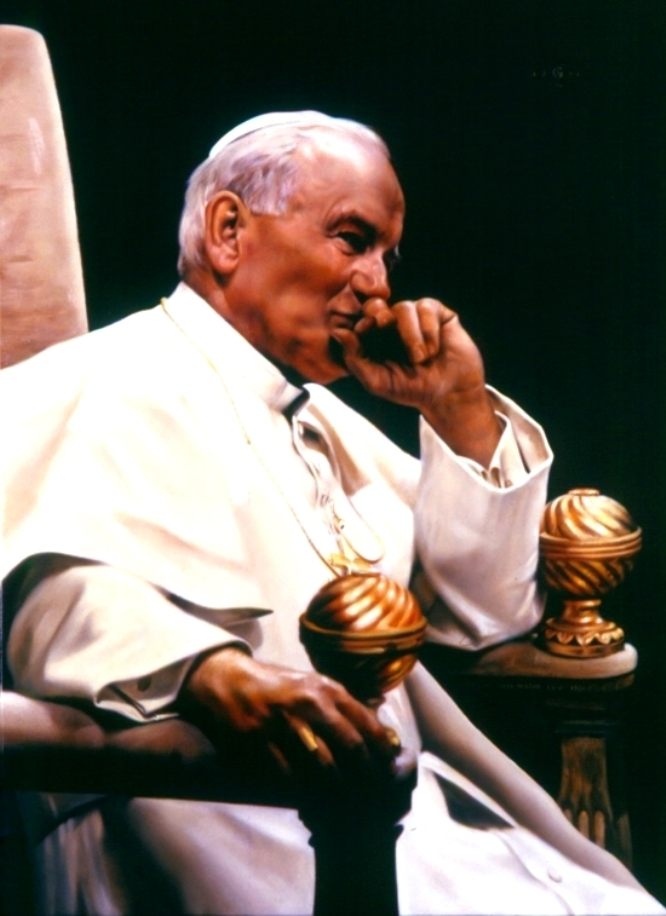
Pope John Paul II

His works are exhibited in public and private galleries. He belonged to the Accademia Tiberina and the Accademia dei 500.

Salmoiraghi died on 27 December 2022, at the age of 86.

== Related Items ==
- painter Max Doerner biography
- painter Federico Von Rieger biography
- Church San Giacinto BS
- Palace of Saint Callixtus
