= Guglielmo Stella =

Italian painter (1828–1888)

Guglielmo Stella (1828–1888) was an Italian painter and writer, active in a Realist style.

He was born in Milan. He did not attend a particular academy or have any specific mentor but was self-educated and drew from eclectic sources. He was equally eclectic in subjects he painted or wrote about. He was an artistic collaborator in the journal of La stampa in Venice. He was also a correspondent del Monde lllustré and of Tour de Monde of Paris, along with Enrico Castelnuovo and Alessandro Pascolato. Stella also served as director of the Arte del Mondo Illustrato of Turin and spent some time in Paris.

Camillo Boito said of Stella:

Stella bests all in the subject of depth and in comic wit. Few painters in Italy as he know how to discover in ridiculous things, their pathetic face of things, and in pretentious things, their comical face: he is a subtle revealer of social hypocrisy and of the old prejudices: he is an elegant moralist. His brush is now satirical, and now sentimental, and he is not infrequently sermonizing, like (the playwright) Gaspare Gozzi. He is addicted to paint in large dimensions, but still makes the effort in every part, though minute, to bring life-like rendering; but of this science he is inclined to abuse, and looking overpowers the details of the things, he seems a little dry in the design and raw in color.

Among his works are: An indiscreet scene; A captured peasant; In the sacristy; and the saltimbanco at the bed of his dying wife. In 1870, he exhibited at the Italian Exposition of Fine arts in Parma: The Saintly murmurs and I preparativi per un ballo in maschera. In 1887, at the National Artistic Exposition in Venice: Fiori di rupe and Pax. Regarding the painting "Vice and virtue, which was also titled An Episode of the Carnival of Venice, one contemporary critic said:

It shows up in a family, poor but not destitute, and contrasts the carefree attitude of a husband and good household virtues of his wife... This painting captures one of those gradations of social relationships that escape the eyes of a common observer, but Stella knows how to capture with such assurance and reveal the passionate and happy requests of the heart, and the ill reply of society. Yet the qualities of form and color disappear under the force of philosophical thought, which dominates the composition and grabs the viewer's attention. Oh, if artists thought this way always!

Stella was knighted into the Order of the Crown of Italy. He also became Consigliere Comunale to the council of Venice. In his official positions, he vigorously opposed the projects involving large demolitions that were planned for Venice, by comparing the theories used in the renewal of Naples. His proposal was accepted by many directors and the Board. In 1894, he became director of the Institute of Arts in Venice. For nearly twenty years, he taught figure and industrial decorative composition.
