= Pier Luigi Ighina =

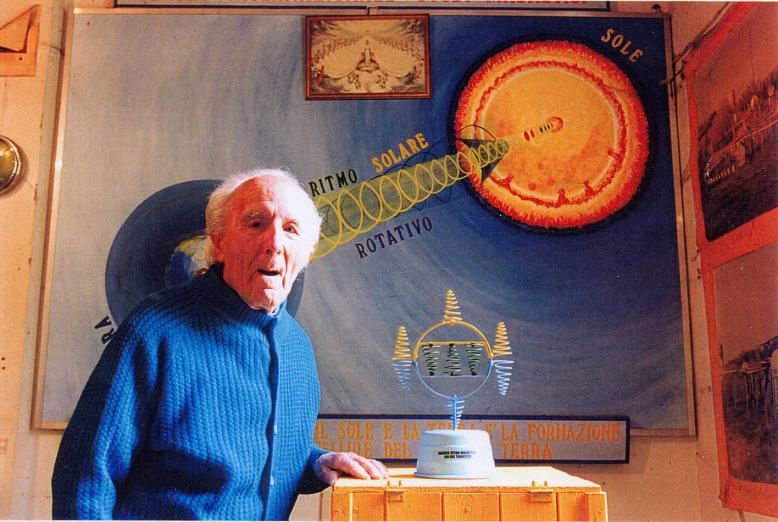
Pier Ighina

Pier Luigi Ighina (1908 in Milan – 2004 in Imola), was an Italian researcher. His unorthodox theories on electromagnetism are not recognized by the scientific community.

== Biography ==
Pier Luigi Ighina studied in Milan Electronics and Radio Transmission and worked at Magneti Marelli, CGE (Compagnia Generale di Elettricità) and then at Ansaldo Lorenz in Genova. He claimed to be the assistant of Guglielmo Marconi for a number of scientific findings. However, no official proof of these collaborations are known.

== The Theory of "Magnetic Atom" ==
His theories involve the concept of the pulsing "Magnetic Atom" at the base of the matter. This "Magnetic Atom" could be scattered into magnetic monopoles, whose interactions are at the basis of life and matter. Waves of magnetic atoms are continuously exchanged between the Sun and the Earth, with a proper frequency and shape. Based on this claims, Ighina built some extravagant machines: in particular one to prevent earthquakes and one other to make it rain. his discoveries and inventions were considered mysterious and nothing short of revolutionary. For years he was assistant to Guglielmo Marconi, from whom he learned some secrets about physics that would be useful for his future theories. However, Ighina did not patent any of his machines and findings.

== Influences in Art ==
The famous Italian musician Franco Battiato cited directly the claims of Ighina in his album Pollution (1972).

== Bibliography ==
- Pier Luigi Ighina, La scoperta dell'atomo magnetico, Imola, Galeati, 1954.(ISBN 88-86064-42-X).
- Giusy Zitoli, Io l'ho conosciuto. L'uomo che avrebbe potuto salvare il pianeta da una distruzione "annunciata". Chi è dunque? Scienziato geniale o "extraterrestre" incarnato uomo?, Pogliano Milanese, Atlantide, 1996. ISBN 88-86064-22-5.
- "Ighina, Pierluigi", in Paolo Albani e Paolo della Bella, Forse Queneau. Enciclopedia delle scienze anomale, Bologna, Zanichelli, 1999, p. 206. ISBN 88-08-26070-4.
- Massimo Barbieri, comments on L'atomo magnetico by Pier Luigi Ighina, 27 dicembre 2001, in Tecnologie di frontiera.
- Alberto Tavanti (a cura di), Pier Luigi Ighina profeta sconosciuto, 2007.
- Alberto Tavanti (a cura di), 1908–2008. Centenario della nascita di Pier Luigi Ighina, un uomo venuto dal futuro, Faenza, 2008.
- Antonio Castronuovo, "Cent'anni di Ighina, scienziato anomalo", in Università aperta. Terza pagina, n. 11 (2008), pp. 10–11.
