= Marco Lui =

Italian comedian

Marco Lui (born 18 July 1975) is an Italian mime and comedian under the stage name of Mr. Lui.

== Biography ==
Lui was born in Milan, Italy. Lui has a degree in physical education from the University of Verona. He began his career about 18 years performing in certain places as a cabaret artist and imitator of Michael Jackson, and later as a tourist entertainer. He later made some television appearances as a guest for Mediaset programs, including Beato fra le donne, Rose rosse, La febbre del sabato sera e Sotto a chi tocca.

Since autumn 2005 creates the screens of Italy 1 to the character of Mr. Lui, a mime in a very short gag comic that appears just before the end of advertising aimed at children (morning and afternoon). The short vignettes are inspired by the comic shorts of Mr. Bean. The protagonist is the subject of particularly paradoxical and unfortunate events. The technical style mirrors that of the comics of the past (always room sets seamlessly) increased the current use of colours, sounds and digital noise.

The Mr. Lui character was the target of campaigns on the Internet asking for his removal from Mediaset.

Presently, possibly due to the many petitions created him in recent months, his skits have been severely reduced and replaced by the mascot's official Boing, broadcaster's children's Mediaset launched on digital terrestrial, and himself in a stacchetto, further significant reduction of the background, which shows him in front of a wall on which the logo reappears Boing. From July 2008 its gags have definitely disappeared from Italia 1 as confirmed by the comic itself, are replaced by 6 as 6 and the mascot Boing. He's always creating something new on Italy 1 but will not be present before and after the cartoons.

He also collaborates actively with Fiorello, for which she cared for filming, directing and editing the backstage theatre tour of Flower, and no one hundred thousand, in addition to the backstage of the program Viva Radio Due.

Lui's family joined the Church of Jesus Christ of Latter-day Saints (LDS Church) when he was five years old. He later served as an LDS missionary in Sicily from 1997 to 1999.

Lui has also directed and produced several movies, including The Book of Life (2010) and Dr Smith and the Fantastic Castle (2012).

== Filmography ==
| Year | Title | Role | Notes |
|---|---|---|---|
| 2010 | The Book of Life | Actor/Director | |
| 2012 | Dr Smith and the Fantastic Castle | Actor/Director | |
| 2013 | Cripta | Actor/Director | |
| 2013 | Checkmatetime | Actor/Director | |
| 2014 | John | Director/Producer | |

== Television ==
| Year | Title | Role | Notes |
|---|---|---|---|
| 2013 - Present | Zecchino d'Oro | Selection Presenter | |
