= Renato Fumagalli =

- Birth name: Renato Fumagalli
- Born: 6 June 1945 (age 80) Milan, Italy
- Genres: Rock; pop; protest music; beat music
- Occupations: Musician; songwriter; producer; actor
- Instruments: Vocals; guitar; synthesizer; keyboards; piano
- Years active: 1965–present

Renato Fumagalli is an Italian singer/songwriter, guitarist, and actor. He was the frontman of the Italian beat group Gli Spioni, mostly known for their breakthrough hit "Mondo capellone".

== Early life ==
Renato Fumagalli was born in Milan on 6 June 1945. His father, Arnaldo Fumagalli, worked at Ramazzotti distillery. Her mother, Pippa Berichelli, was a nurse at San Raffaele Hospital.

In 1963 Fumagalli met Franco Cisti while attending Liceo Classico Giuseppe Parini. They started playing together and in 1965 they formed Gli Spioni, together with Artemide Palafrenieri and Lippo Artusi.

== With Gli Spioni ==
In early 1966, Gli Spioni were signed by LSDischi and they quickly released their first single "Mondo capellone" (Italian for "Hippie World"). "Mondo capellone" entered the Cantagiro music contest in the summer of 1966 and was a big success. In late summer of 1966, Fumagalli and Cisti moved to the San Francisco Bay Area to attend several Acid Tests held by the author Ken Kesey. During his stay, Fumagalli met Anton Szandor LaVey and he joined the Church of Satan. His growing drug addiction and his radical satanism caused several infights between the members of the band, that led to the disbanding of the band later that year.

== With I Capelloni ==
In the spring of 1967 Fumagalli moved back to Milan and founded the Via Ripamonti Beat Camping. The camping, derogatorily called "New Barbonia" or "Barbonia City" by the Italian press, had a short life, as it was evacuated by the police in the summer of 1967. During his stay in Barbonia City, Fumagalli and Franco Cisti formed I Capelloni and recorded the protest album Hippie triste (Italian for "Sad Hippie").

== Discography ==
With Gli Spioni:

- Albums:
  - In un mondo capellone (1966)
- Singles:
  - Mondo capellone/La vera identità (1966)
  - Il più bel giorno/Perso in un trip (1966)
  - Selvaggia (1966)

With I Capelloni:

- Albums:
  - Hippie triste (1967)
