= Rinaldo Agazzi =

Italian painter

Rinaldo Agazzi (30 October 1857 – 24 May 1939) was an Italian painter of landscapes and portraits.

== Biography ==
He was born in Mapello, Province of Bergamo. Along with Giovanni Cavalleri, he was awarded a stipend in 1879 to study in Rome, where he frequented the Accademia Libera of Cesare Maccari. He was resident in Bergamo. In 1888, he exhibited at Bologna: Giornata serena; Gli schiavi bianchi; and Il calzolaio. At the Exhibition of Turin of 1884, he exhibited: Pensieri allegri; Casa rustica, and two landscapes. He also painted portraits.

In 1879, Agazzi's painting A Bread in Two won a prize at an exhibition in Carrara. While he was in the Accademia Libera he became acquainted with numerous realist painters of the time, including Giacomo Favretto, Luigi Nono, Ettore Tito, Vincenzo Irolli and others. This influence of realism in his work remained under the latter stages of his career, when he began painting portraits and idyllic subjects.

His brother was the painter Ermenegildo Agazzi (1866–1945). He was a pupil of Enrico Scuri at the Accademia Carrara of Bergamo. He painted in the Realist style of Cesare Tallone.

Later in life, Agazzi exhibited at the World Exposition in Paris and the International Exposition in Barcelona. He was invited to the Biennale of Munich in 1905 and 1909 and to the Venice Biennale in 1920. In 1895, he helped found the artist's association in Bergamo: Circolo “Palma il Vecchio”. In 1927 he had a personal exhibition in Bergamo. He died in 1939 in Bergamo.
