= Attilio Colonello =

Italian theatre director (1930–2021)

Attilio Colonello (9 November 1930 – 12 August 2021) was an Italian scenic designer and stage director who was active within the field of opera.

== Biography ==
Born in Milan, Colonello studied architecture in Milan with Gio Ponti and Ernesto Rogers. He first drew critical praise for his designs for La traviata at the Maggio Musicale Fiorentino in 1956. This was followed by designs for Arrigo Boito's Mefistofele at La Scala in 1958. He designed several more Milan productions, including Don Pasquale in 1965 and two productions for Margherita Wallmann: the première of Ildebrando Pizzetti’s Clitennestra in 1965 and another Don Pasquale in 1973.

In 1962 Colonello made his United States debut at the Dallas Civic Opera with a critically acclaimed production of Giuseppe Verdi's Otello. He designed another production at that house following a year, Monteverdi's L'incoronazione di Poppea. He worked for the Metropolitan Opera for the first time in 1964 when he designed a Jacobean Lucia di Lammermoor for Wallmann. He later designed two productions for Nathaniel Merrill at the Met: a 19th-century Luisa Miller (1968) and a gloomy Il trovatore (1969).

Since 1964 Colonello worked frequently as a scenic designer and director for the Teatro di San Carlo. His first production with the company was Roberto Devereux, again with Wallmann as director. He then designed and directed productions of Adriana Lecouvreur (1966), the première of Jacopo Napoli’s Barone avaro, and Samson et Dalila (both 1970), Carmen (1975), La Gioconda (1977) and I puritani and Luisa Miller (both 1988).

Colonello's best work has been with the Arena di Verona Festival, beginning with a splendid Nabucco in 1962. In 1964 he designed and directed productions of Cavalleria rusticana and La bohème and designed a production of Mefistofele for director Herbert Graf. He then designed Carmen (1965), Rigoletto (1966), La forza del destino (1967) and Andrea Chénier (1967). For the festival's 100th anniversary he staged Aida (1968) and later returned for a lauded production of Un ballo in maschera (1972). In 1984 he returned to design and direct I Lombardi.

== Sources ==
- David J. Hough, "Attilio Colonello". The New Grove Dictionary of Opera, edited by Stanley Sadie (1992), ISBN 0-333-73432-7
