= Mario Ciminaghi =

Italian footballer

Personal information
- Date of birth: 1 February 1910
- Place of birth: Milan, Italy
- Position: Midfielder

Senior career*
Years	Team	Apps	(Gls)
1927–1928	Milanese	17	(?)
1928–1931	Ambrosiana-Inter	3	(0)
1931–1936	Catanzaro		
- * Club domestic league appearances and goals

Mario Ciminaghi (born 1 February 1910, date of death unknown) was an Italian professional football player.

== Honours ==
- Serie A champion: 1929/30.
