= Adelaide Coari =

Italian teacher and editor

Adelaide Coari (4 November 1881 – 16 February 1966) was an Italian Catholic feminist, trade unionist, social activist, teacher and later school inspector. She edited the monthly journal L'Azione muliebre, founded the bi-weekly publication Pensiero e Azione and helped found a Christian women's group. She was active in promoting unionization of women, women's education and women's suffrage.

== Life ==
Coari was born 4 November 1881 in Milan, Italy into an strongly religious Roman Catholic family. Her father was a wood merchant, and the family are not considered affluent. Coari qualified as a teacher in 1901, and gained a teaching position in a rural public school in Cascina (Milan). As a young woman she studied journalism and at 20 years old became a Christian feminist. At the same time she worked as an editorial assistant at Lega Cattolica Femminile's monthly journal L'Azione muliebre, where she later became editor. Inspired by the work of Romolo Murri, Coari helped found the women’s Christian group Gruppo di Donne Democratiche Cristiane, alongside Adele Colombo, Angiolina Dotti and Pierina Corbetta. The membership was mostly made up of women teachers and students. Coari was also involved in Federazione delle Donne di Milano, a Milanese women's group.

The ecclesiastical assistant to L’Azione muliebre, Don Marianu, criticised Coari’s views as too extreme. In 1904, supported by Andrea Ferrari, Coari left L'Azione muliebre to start Pensiero e Azione (Thought and Action), a biweekly publication promoting women's unionization. In 1905, Pensiero supported votes for women, in opposition to the view taken by L’Azione muliebre. Coari participated in a number of initiatives aimed at women’s education, such as study circles and literacy education.

Coari went to Cosenza and Catania to support people affected by the 1905 Calabria earthquake. In 1907 she was on the executive committee of the women’s conference at the Villa Reale in Milan.

In 1909, church authorities shut down Pensiero e Azione as too modernist, and Coari abandoned union activism for teaching and other charitable work. She again travelled to assist earthquake victims in Messina in 1909. Coari’s teaching beliefs were that set lessons should not be prepared, but should be led by the interests of the child. She was invited to set up a school for teachers in the south, but as it was to be based on Montessori methods, the secularism of which she did not approve, she declined. She later became a school inspector in Milan.

In 1939 Coari retired from teaching and moved to Rovegno near Genoa. She died 16 February 1966 in Milan, Italy.
