= María de Navas =

María de Navas Bocos (18 March 1678 – 5 March 1721) was a Spanish stage actress born in Milan, known as La Milanesa.

She was born to a family of actors, the daughter of Alonso de Navas and María Bocos. She belonged to the more famous and popular groups of her era, known for her male roles, and was active both as a playwright and as a theater director and leader of her own theater company (1702-1704). She was involved in a case were her personal morals were questioned by a false biography, which attracted a lot of attention.

She died in Madrid in 1721.
