= Roberto Poluzzi =

Italian footballer (born 1936)

Personal information
- Date of birth: 16 October 1936 (age 90)
- Place of birth: Milan, Italy
- Position: Midfielder

Senior career*
Years	Team	Apps	(Gls)
1956–1958	Internazionale	1	(0)
1958–1960	Como	4	(1)
1960–1961	Casale	30	(6)
- * Club domestic league appearances and goals

Roberto Poluzzi (born 16 October 1936) is an Italian retired professional football player.

== See also ==
- Football in Italy
- List of football clubs in Italy
