= Ermenegildo Agazzi =

Italian painter (1866–1945)

Ermenegildo Agazzi (24 July 1866 – 25 October 1945) was an Italian painter, active in painting genre, portraits, and landscapes. He began his career painting in a style similar to Scapigliatura painters.

== Biography ==
He was born in Mapello, and active mainly in Milan. He was the brother of Rinaldo, also a painter. Agazzi studied at the Accademia Carrara of Bergamo under Cesare Tallone; then moved to Milan, and exhibited at the Brera Academy first in 1886. He won many awards and continued to exhibit until the late 1930s.

He exhibited at Paris in 1900 (where he won a gold medal), at Milan in 1901, at Brussels in 1910; and at Milan in 1915 (where he won the Baragiola prize) and 1928 (when he won the Fornara prize). He participated in many Biennale, and in 1930 had a personal exhibition in Milan. In 1938, he was awarded a gold medal by the Ministry of National Education. At the Galleria d'Arte Moderna of Milan, there are a number of his works, including Ponte Vico a Chioggia (1932); Landscape (1916); Portrait of Man (1909); Valleys of Bergamo (1928); Portrait of a Child (1932); and Il violino (1938). To avoid aerial bombardments during World War II, he fled Milan for Bergamo, when he met accidental death.
