= Carlo Paolo Agazzi =

Italian painter (1870–1922)

Carlo Paolo Agazzi or Carlo Agazzi (May 5, 1870 – December 5, 1922) was an Italian painter of landscapes and still lifes in oil and watercolors. He also made etchings.

== Biography ==
He was born in Milan. He was a pupil of Giuseppe Bertini at the Brera Academy. At the Mostra of the Brera Academy, he exhibited a winter landscape titled Still Life and a Studio d' autunno. He also frescoed the Villa of Carlo Alberto Pisani Dossi on the shores of Lake Como and the Villa Marenzi in Torbiato with Scenes from Goethe's Faust (incomplete).

He exhibited at the Milan Permanente (1892, 1893, and 1895), the Exposition of the Famiglia Artistica (1909–1911), at the Triennali of Milan (1889, 1894, and 1900), at the Promotrici of Genoa (1892), Turin (1892, 1896, and 1902), and the 1899 Venice Biennale. He died in Milan in 1922.
