= Aurelio Biassoni =

Italian footballer (born 1912)

Personal information
- Date of birth: 12 June 1912
- Place of birth: Milan, Italy
- Position: Midfielder

Senior career*
Years	Team	Apps	(Gls)
1928–1930	Corbetta		
1931–1932	Ambrosiana-Inter	2	(1)
1932–1934	Pavia	24	(6)
1934–1935	Atalanta	25	(4)
1935–1936	Sanremese		
1936–1938	Falck Sesto San Giovanni	47	(6)
1938–1940	Seregno		
1940–1941	Cantù	18	(4)
- * Club domestic league appearances and goals

Aurelio Biassoni (born 12 June 1912, date of death unknown) was an Italian professional football player.
