= Nunziante =

Nunziante is given name and surname. Notable people with the name include:

== Surname ==
- Alessandro Nunziante (1815–1881), Italian general and politician
- Gennaro Nunziante (born 1963), Italian film director
- Vito Nunziante (1775–1836), Italian general, politician and entrepreneur

== Given name ==
- Nunziante Consiglio (born 1964), Italian politician
- Nunziante Ippolito (1796–1851), Italian physician and anatomist
