= Giuseppe Salvatore Pianell =

Italian general and politician (1818–1892)

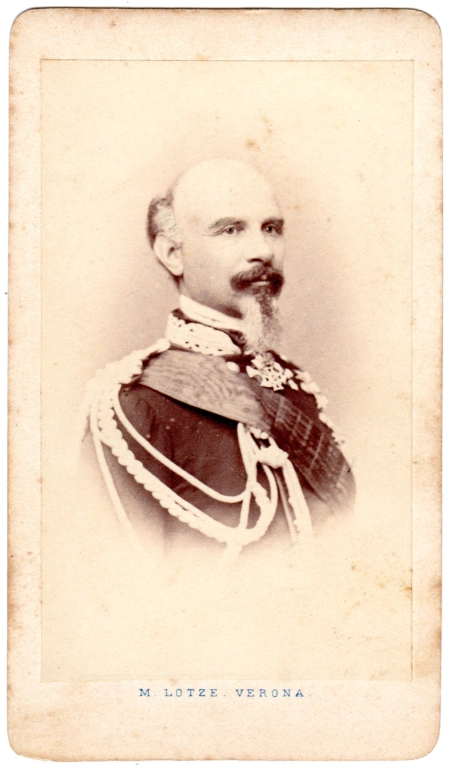

Minister of War of the Kingdom of the Two Sicilies
- In office 14 July 1860 – 31 August 1860
- Monarch: Francis II of the Two Sicilies

Deputy of the Kingdom of Italy
- In office 1867

Senator of the Kingdom of Italy
- In office 15 November 1871 – 5 April 1892

Personal details
- Born: 9 November 1818 Palermo, Kingdom of the Two Sicilies
- Died: 5 April 1892 (aged 73) Verona, Kingdom of Italy
- Education: Nunziatella Military School

Military service
- Allegiance: Kingdom of the Two Sicilies (until 1860); Kingdom of Italy
- Branch/service: Army of the Two Sicilies; Royal Italian Army
- Rank: Army corps general (since 1866)
- Commands: 2nd Army Corps (commander of forces in northern Italy) from 1869
- Battles/wars: Third Italian War of Independence; Sicilian revolution of 1848; Battle of Custoza (1866)

Giuseppe Salvatore Pianell (Palermo, 9 November 1818 – Verona, 5 April 1892) was an Italian general and politician. Count since 1856.

He was appointed Minister of War of the Kingdom of the Two Sicilies in July 1860, in the days of the Expedition of the Thousand. In favor of an alliance with Piedmont and the application of the constitution promulgated by Francis II, he was for this reason opposed by much of the Bourbon court. He resigned after a few weeks in the ministry and, following the proclamation of the Kingdom of Italy, was granted entry into the Italian Army with the rank of general.

He distinguished himself at the Battle of Custoza (1866) as commander of the only Italian division that did not retreat in the face of the Austrian counteroffensive. In 1869 he became commander of the Royal Army forces in northern Italy. He repeatedly refused the post of Minister of War of the Kingdom of Italy and was a deputy and senator for life in the Italian Parliament. He was accused by the Bourbons of favoring the demise of the Kingdom of the Two Sicilies, and by some Unionists of the opposite. Later he became one of the symbols of national unity.

== Biography ==
=== Origins and youth (1818–1845) ===
Giuseppe Salvatore Piànell (sometimes referred to as Pianelli erroneously or in derision) was born in Palermo in 1818 to Francesco Pianell, an official in the Bourbon military administration, and Cirilla Jannelli, the only daughter of General Baron Jannelli. The latter, for services rendered in the war to Joachim Murat, acquired the fiefdom of S. Eufemia, which the Bourbons took back after the Conservative Order.

In 1827, as part of a vast restructuring, the Bourbon Army went from being a force of foreign professionals to becoming a force of compulsory conscription for economic reasons. The officer ranks for the Sicilian regiments were put up for sale, and Pianell's father bought for his son the rank of captain. Pianell thus became a captain at age 9 and on November 1, 1828, entered the military college of the Nunziatella, in Naples. He left in September 1836, achieving excellent results and taking service as captain in the 6th Battalion of Riflemen.

=== The Campaigns against the Sicilian uprisings (1846–1850) ===
On 15 March 1846, Pianell was appointed major and commander of the 1st Riflemen Battalion. When the Sicilian Independence Revolution of 1848 broke out, he participated with his unit in the expedition commanded by Guglielmo De Sauget to Palermo. During the fighting, on 16 January 1848, he was wounded while leading his battalion that was preparing to attack the insurgents.

In the spring of the same 1848 while a revolt was imminent in Naples, from Cosenza Pianell demonstrated for the first time officially an independent critical judgment on the situation in the Kingdom. From June to August 1848 he was part of the Calabrian expedition with the column commanded by General Ferdinando Lanza that successfully forced the passage of the Crati (or San Martino) valley occupied by the insurgents. On this occasion Pianell distinguished himself, and Lanza reported this to his superiors (July 1848).

In September 1848, following the events of the revolution, Pianell was again in Sicily where his 1st Riflemen Battalion participated in the reconquest of Messina. For this action the unit obtained a "promotion of grace" for every soldier of every rank from 1st sergeant to 1st lieutenant. Pianell himself, for the events of Palermo and Messina, was decorated with the Cross of Knight of the Royal Order of St. Ferdinand and of Merit (24 November 1848).

As the revolutionary uprisings in Sicily continued, in April 1849 Pianell, who in the meantime had been promoted to lieutenant-colonel, found himself part of the expedition that moved from Messina with great success to reconquer Taormina and Catania. He was rewarded with the First Class Gold Medal and, the following year, decorated with the Officer's Cross of the Military Order of St. George of the Reunion of the Two Sicilies (August 1850).

=== Colonel and general at Gaeta (1850–1859) ===
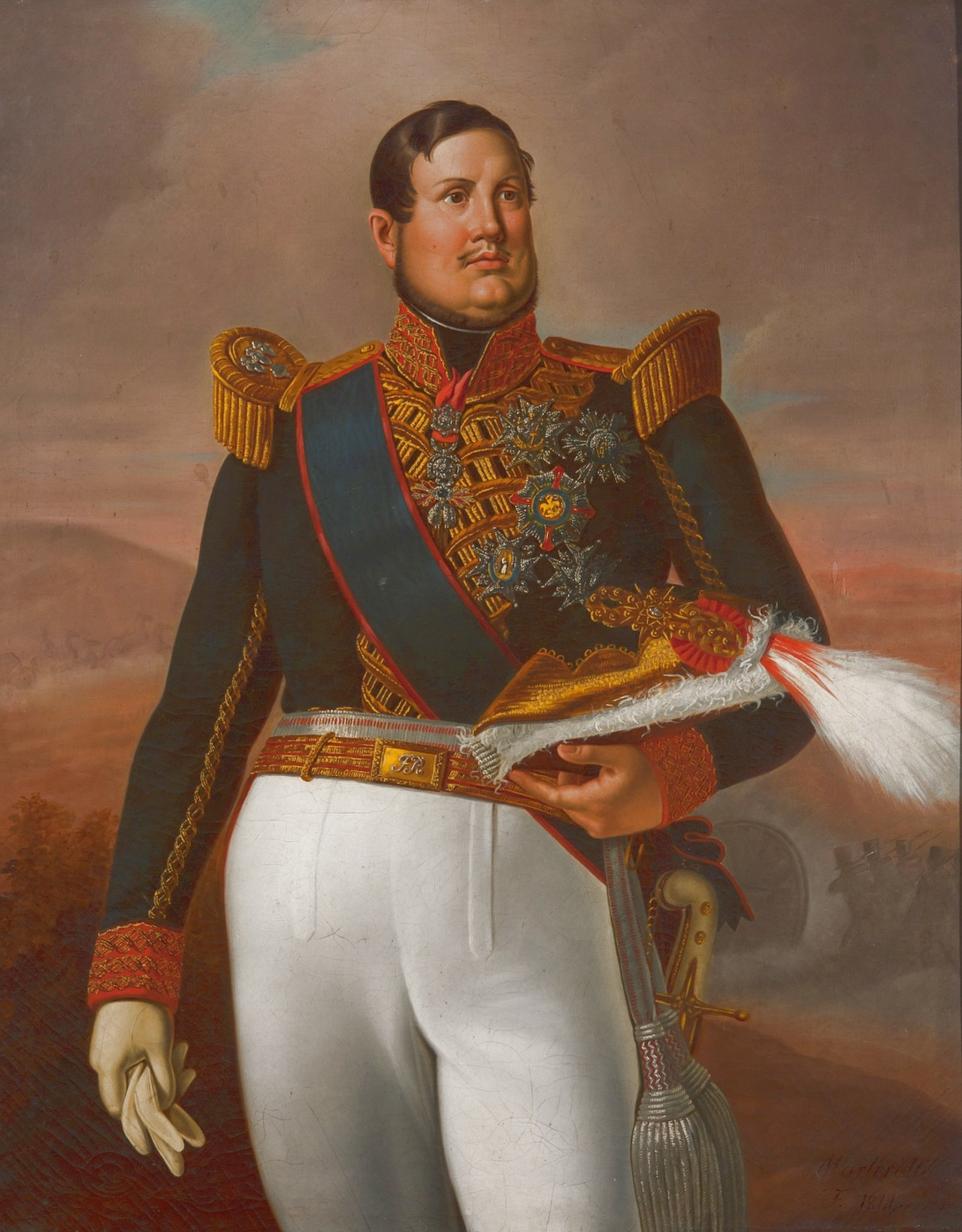
Ferdinand II of Bourbon. In 1855 he forced Pianell into a forced retreat to Gaeta that lasted until Francis II ascended the throne in 1859.

In March 1850, when he was 32 years old, Pianell was promoted to colonel and assigned to the 1st Line Regiment. In 1855 an episode unexpectedly interrupted his string of acclaim: King Ferdinand II of Bourbon, during an inspection of the barracks at San Potito, Naples, commanded by Pianell, gave credence to some of the soldiers' grievances, who complained about the food and superiors. Before them, Ferdinand ordered that Pianell be locked up for 15 days at Castel Sant'Elmo.

It was probably a precautionary measure the sovereign took against the liberal ideas and autonomy of judgment of the colonel who, with his regiment, was then transferred to Gaeta. He remained there until the death of Ferdinand, who for years repeated, "That young gentleman thinks too much... it is better to keep him away."

Despite this, Pianell in December 1855 was promoted to general commander of the Gaeta brigade, and in July 1856, thanks to his future father-in-law, Count Costantino Ludolf, he received the news that he would become count by marrying the latter's daughter, Eleonora, to whom he was already engaged: the wedding was celebrated On 6 August 1856.

Pianell's consort, Eleonora Ludolf, belonged to a family of diplomats who moved to Naples from Erfurt, Thuringia during the time of Charles of Bourbon. The Pianell couple lived peacefully through the years in Gaeta, during which the general devoted himself to service and to the military studies he would never again abandon.

=== Lieutenant in Abruzzo (1859–1860) ===
On 20 May 1859, Ferdinand II died in Caserta; he was succeeded to the throne by Francis II, who immediately had to deal with the important news of the time: the Duchy of Parma, the Duchy of Modena and Reggio and Romagna passed into the Piedmontese sphere of influence, while a Garibaldian army threatened the papal frontier.

Francis II decided to recall Pianell from the Gaeta retreat and appointed him, on 1 July 1859, commander of the Nocera brigade that was garrisoned in Naples, at the Granili. As the political situation worsened, on September 21 he reconvened him at the Royal Palace of Portici and entrusted him with an army of twelve thousand soldiers to protect the northeastern borders of the Kingdom against the feared Garibaldi invasion. He also gave him full powers as Territorial Commander of the three Abruzzo provinces.

On that occasion Pianell expressed to Francis II the need to grant free institutions that would satisfy the honest wishes of his people. On 28 September 1859 he left for Sulmona where he arrived the next day.

The work of defense and reorganization in Abruzzo proved to be very demanding. The threat of invasion from the north, however, seemed averted as early as November, when the Piedmontese realized that raising a question in Europe about an attack on papal territory would have been politically foolish. Pianell, however, continued his work, reorganizing government and municipal offices, reforming justice and police personnel, plotting and commissioning public works for which he had both local personnel and soldiers work; and when he was recalled to Naples in July 1860, the people of Chieti and Ortona elected him an honorary citizen.

==== Filangieri's resignation ====
General Carlo Filangieri, in early 1860, resigned as Prime Minister and Minister of War. Pianell, who admired his former commander, also shared his political views. Both hoped for an alliance of the Kingdom of the Two Sicilies with Piedmont and the proclamation of the Constitution. Filangieri resigned over disagreements with Francis II, and Pianell welcomed the news as "the gravest misfortune for the country, for the army and for me."

On 15 February 1860 Pianell complained of slander he had suffered; he was convinced, however, that something had to change. In March he wrote to his wife, "One cannot remain eternally stationary. The world walks, and one must walk with it. A legitimate outlet must be given to the vital forces of society, under pain that they do not react covertly and, in the end, overflow." On 18 April 1860, General Pianell was promoted to Field Marshal.

==== Advice to Francis II ====
In support of the Sicilian uprisings, Garibaldi landed at Marsala on 11 May 1860, and entered Palermo on the 30th. On 25 June, Francis II finally granted the Constitution reactivating the one of 1848, announced an amnesty for political offenses and the formation of a new government headed by liberal Antonio Spinelli who, like Pianell, hoped for an alliance with Piedmont.

After many difficulties, the Prime Minister formed his cabinet, assigning Giosuè Ritucci the Ministry of War, after Roberto de Sauget, the Prince of Ischitella (1788–1875) and Francesco Casella (1781–1875) had refused the post.

During that period Pianell wrote several times to the government and the king. To Francis II he declared that to save the country it was necessary to implement the newly promulgated Constitution, accept a confederation of Italian states, and completely reorganize the army, focusing above all on discipline.

On 6 July 1860, Francis II recalled Pianell from Abruzzo, who on the 13th, at a Council of War at which the king and Spinelli were also present, argued that the loss of Palermo had demoralized the troops and that from Messina it was at present impossible to get a reconquest of Sicily off the ground. Politically, he added, the continuation of hostilities would be counterproductive, and he urged a truce to forge an Italian League with Piedmont. The truce would also have the purpose of reorganizing the army and implementing the constitutional regime to gain the confidence of the progressives and ultimately attempt to reconquer Sicily. These ideas were validly supported by Foreign Minister Giacomo De Martino (1811–1877).

=== Minister of War of the Kingdom of the Two Sicilies (1860) ===
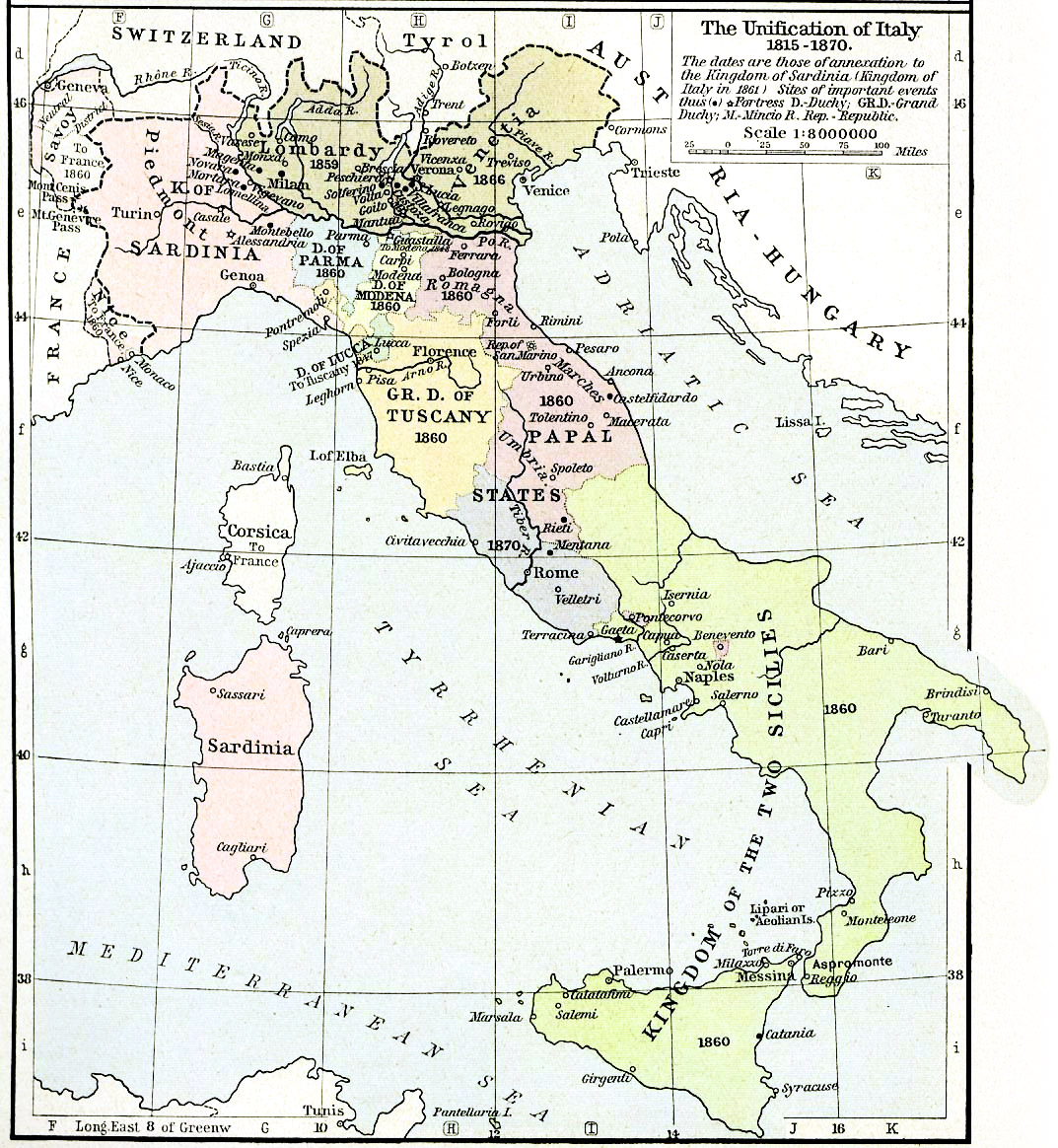
With the Constitution of June 1860, the Kingdom of Two Sicilies aspired to an agreement, to protect common interests, with Piedmont (Sardinia).

The flag of the Kingdom of the Two Sicilies after the proclamation of the Constitution in June 1860

At this stage, the government, faced with the refusal of some garrisons to obey the Constitution feared a plot by reactionary courtiers and decided on a renewal in favor of more liberal personalities. The day after the War Council, 14 July 1860, Pianell was appointed Minister of War in place of Ritucci, and Liborio Romano replaced Interior Minister Federico Del Re.

The Order of the Day issued by Pianell to the Neapolitan Army on 15 July 1860, concludes as follows: "[...] The Officers [...] and soldiers, have therefore in mind that the Constitutional King, the Italian Alliance, the Italian Flag, our own autonomy, now unite us in one family, in order thus to show that we are all the benefactors of these new institutions profitable to all, and particularly to those who are setting out on the glorious career of arms."

The next day Francis II decorated Pianell with the Cross of Commander of the Order of Francis I for his services in Abruzzo.

==== Operations in Sicily ====
Consistent with his ideas, Pianell immediately gave orders to the commander of troops in Messina, General Tommaso Clary, to remain on the defensive. On 14 July he allowed the brigade commanded by Ferdinand Bosco to leave for Milazzo, which was threatened by Garibaldi's troops. After some clashes, on the 20th, Bosco was forced to fall back toward the Sicilian town.

Pianell asked Clary, in vain, to march to Bosco's aid and transferred three foreign battalions and a Swiss battery to Castellammare to land behind the enemy. The reinforcements, however, could not be embarked on because of serious disagreements between Louis, Count of Aquila (Francis II's uncle) and the Bourbon navy.

Once this attempt failed, which further demoralized the army, Pianell, in agreement with the rest of the government, decided to withdraw the troops from Milazzo and take them back to Naples.

Moreover, taking advantage of France's proposal to Piedmont to impose an armistice on Garibaldi, he determined to withdraw the troops from Messina as well in order not to expose them to further defeat, and to favor the diplomats negotiating for the Italian League (which Pianell looked to with excessive hope).

Nevertheless, Garibaldi did not agree with Piedmont, and General Clary was forced to negotiate the capitulation himself by handing over the city on 28 July 1860. The terms of surrender, however, allowed the troops from Messina to be embarked and assigned to the defense of Calabria.

==== Attempts to reorganize the Army ====
Having almost completely abandoned Sicily, Pianell focused on the continental reorganization of the Bourbon Army. He endeavored to provide the corps that had returned from Palermo with the necessary equipment, set standards of discipline in several departments, forced returnees to reach their destinations, rejected applications for leave or resignation, took care of promotions where needed, especially in the Engineer Corps, and increased the number of staff officers.

For the returning officers from Palermo punished by the king with a forced retreat to Ischia, Pianell set up a Military Council to determine responsibilities and recover meritorious men and assign them to the defense of Calabria. The Military Junta, at the end of its investigation, declared that it had found no serious elements of guilt, so all the suspects were released and returned to Naples. Contrary to what he had hoped, Pianell found himself having to deal with a multitude of officers who said they were disgraced and discredited, some of whom wanted to be tried while others demanded their resignations. Some of them, however, were recovered and returned to duty.

At court, meanwhile, insinuations by Francis of Bourbon, Count of Trapani accusing Pianell of having connections with revolutionary committees did not prevent the latter from continuing his work and forming the brigades and divisions of the new Continental Army. For the command-in-chief, Pianell decided on General Giambattista Vial, since he was young and educated, had not been involved in the events in Sicily, inspired confidence in the king and was not opposed by the troops. Above all, he was one of the few available.

==== Conflicts with the generals ====
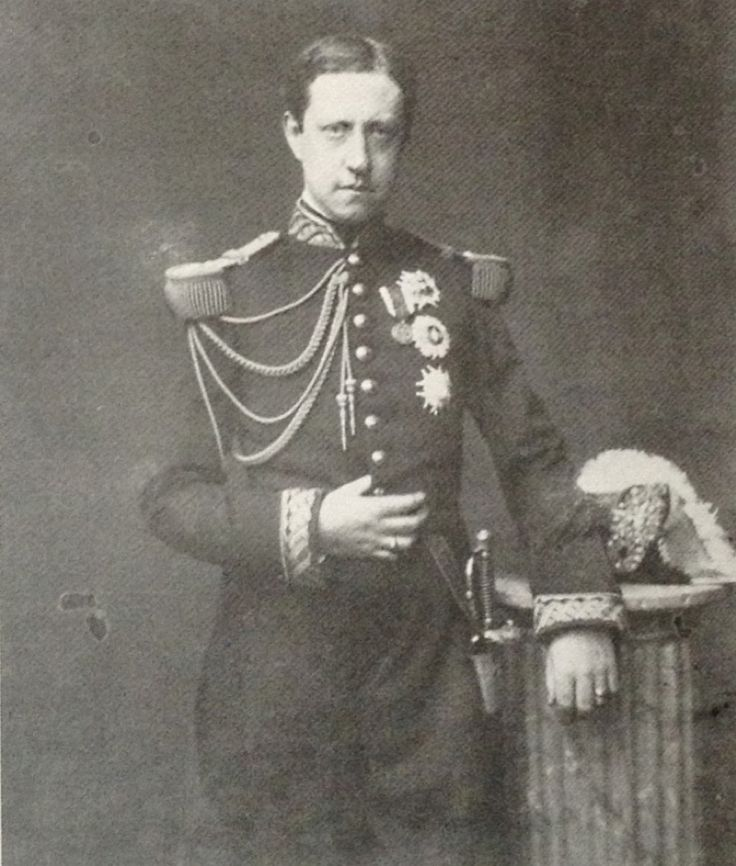
The Count of Trapani, Pianell's most influential opponent at the Bourbon court.

Vial gladly accepted the assignment, but not all commanders were enthusiastic. General Bartolo Marra telegraphed on August 2 complaining about the lack of instructions and topographical maps, and a few days later he sent a telegram in which, with disrespectful words, he considered himself relieved of command. The event caused quite a stir; Pianell had to reprimand the general, and the latter still responded insolently, until, on August 8, he was recalled to Naples and placed under arrest at Castel Sant'Elmo.

In those same days, Pianell's former colleague Mariano d'Ayala, sent by Cavour to further the Italian cause, proposed to the Minister of War that the Bourbon army be turned over to Piedmont, and was refused.

On 19 August 1860, evading the surveillance of the few ships of the Bourbon navy, Garibaldi crossed the Strait of Messina and landed south of Reggio Calabria. Wanting to take advantage of numerical superiority, Pianell and Francis II ordered attacks to be concentrated on the landed enemies; but Vial, from the first moment, lost contact with his generals, who, on the other hand, instead of keeping the troops together exhausted them in inconclusive marches.

On 21 August Pianell, in a telegram, spurred Vial to attack:

"I receive your report of 10.25 a.m. I have to remark to you that it is no longer time to wait until necessity requires you to march. I earnestly beg you to concentrate the troop you have in hand, should you be well assured that you are the largest force landed between Scilla and Bagnara [...] Do not cease to comply with the instructions you have received."

==== Events in Calabria ====
Meanwhile, rumors began to spread about contacts of senior Bourbon officers with the Garibaldians. Neapolitan Colonel Giuseppe Ruiz de Ballestreros telegraphed the king on August 22 that the brigades of Generals Nicola Melendez and Fileno Briganti had surrendered at Villa San Giovanni without firing a shot. The news, rightly deemed false, outraged Pianell and Francis II, who multiplied their efforts to call the commanders back to a sense of duty.

Ruiz, who had announced his retreat, received a telegram from Pianell, which left the same day, 22 August, at 6 p.m., ordering him to return and rejoin the bulk of the troops immediately. The next day Ruiz resigned his command. Meanwhile, Pianell was still inciting Vial, whom he had failed to replace, to attack with what was the last telegram, sent from Naples on 23 August 1860, to Calabria, as the Basilicata insurgents cut the telegraph line.

Given the worsening situation, on the morning of the same 23 August, Pianell asked Francis II if he could leave and assume command of the troops in Calabria. The king acceded to the proposal, but as soon as word spread that the Minister of War would be leaving Naples with a brigade, alarm spread that a revolt, ready for action, would break out in the capital. Preparations for departure proceeded, however, when a message came from Vial that eight steamships loaded with enemy troops were at Torre Faro ready to sail. Fearing a landing near the capital, Pianell's departure was suspended until the steamships' destination was known.

Meanwhile, in Calabria, the situation deteriorated. General Melendez surrendered with three thousand men to Garibaldi on 24 August, and General Briganti, who had fraternized with a Garibaldian acquaintance, in an attempt to reach Vial in plain clothes, was recognized and killed by his soldiers. At that point it became difficult to even maintain control of the troops.

==== The extreme plan ====
Pianell, who saw his plans for the defense of Calabria fading, devised another one for the defense of the capital, to be implemented near Salerno. This plan provided, in order to boost the morale of the soldiers, for the king to march with the troops. The elderly General Raffaele Carrascosa was enthusiastic about it, as was Francis II's consort, Maria Sophie of Bavaria (in favor of any plan of action). The general Prince of Ischitella, very close to the king, on the other hand, rejected it as did the neo-general Ferdinando Bosco. Both did not want Francis II to leave Naples, who eventually, undecided about what to do, gave up moving.

==== Resignation ====
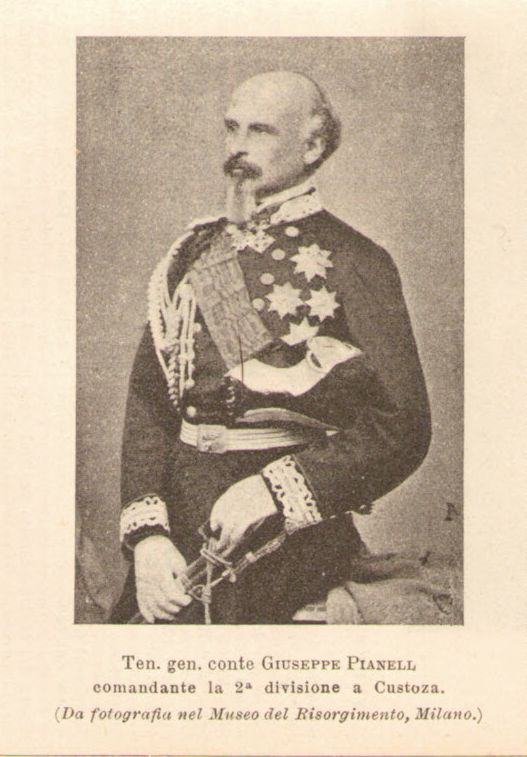
Giuseppe Salvatore Pianell in the 1860s.

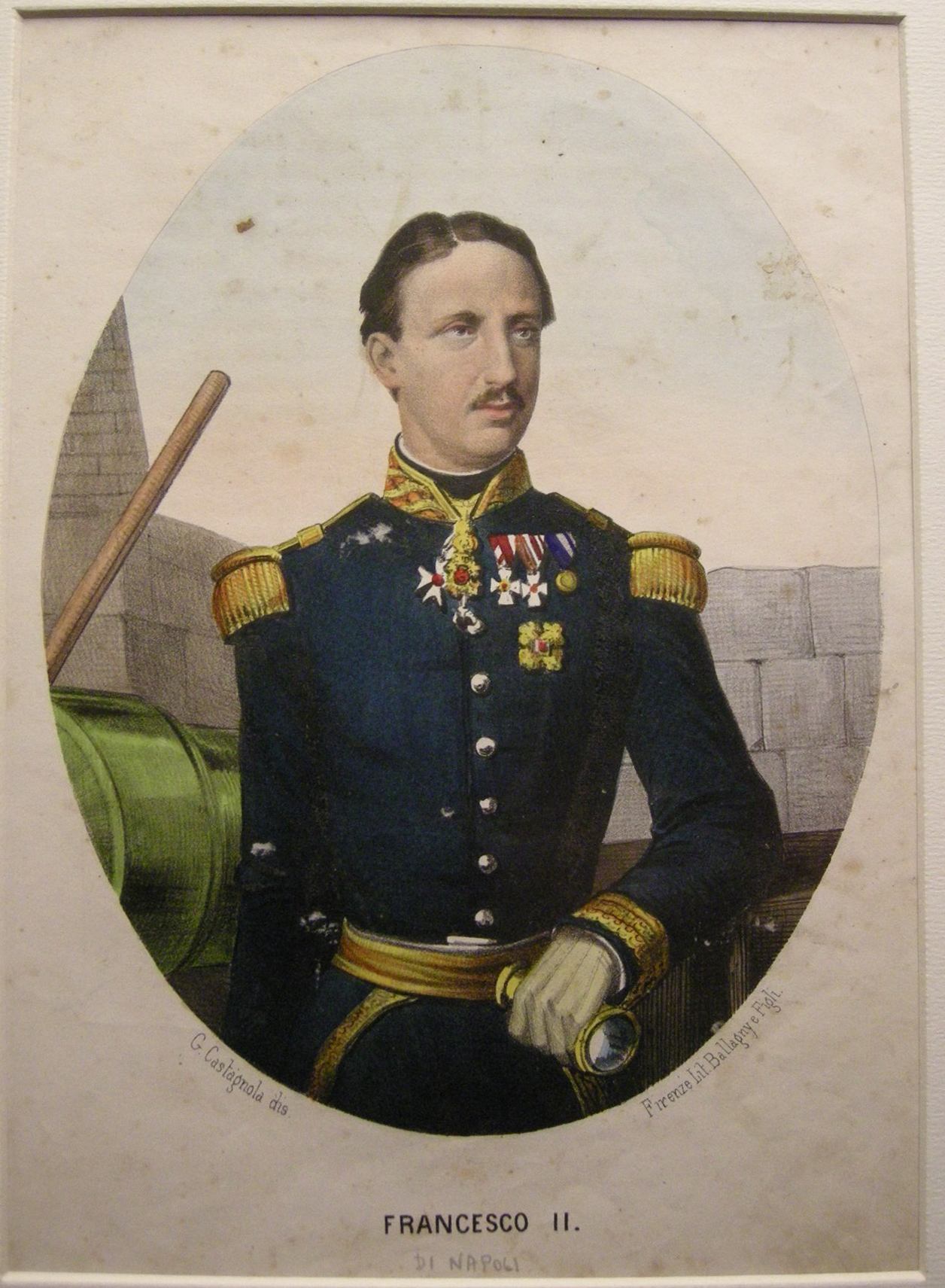
Francis II of Bourbon, whose willingness to resist Pianell underestimated after his defeats south of Naples.

Having again arranged Pianell's departure for Salerno where he was to take command of a division, Francis II, on the 27th again suspended it. At this point the government, unofficially, asked the king if he could resign since he had failed in his mission to have the Constitution peacefully accepted.

Francis II stalled but when Liborio Romano and Pianell announced to him on the night of August 29–30 that they had uncovered a reactionary conspiracy and the king responded ironically, Pianell decided to insist on resignation no matter what. To get the entire government to agree to be replaced, on the 30th, Spinelli went to Francis II and found the Count of Trapani there, who accused the ministers, and especially Pianell, of lies and disloyalty.

During these events, on 30 August, completely surrounded, General Giuseppe Ghio's division also surrendered at Soveria Mannelli.

On August 31 Pianell, determined to act even on his own, wrote a letter to the king (which he delivered to him on September 2) in which he declared himself de facto exonerated from his position as Minister of War. The next day, the government officially resigned. For opposite reasons, the Count of Trapani and the Count of Trani (who, however, returned to the ranks a few months later) also resigned from their military posts.

A second letter from Pianell to Francis II, delivered on September 3, clearly explained the reasons for the resignations, which were mainly caused by the incompatibility between the general and the court environment.

As he reveals in the memoirs and an 1877 letter addressed to Francis II but never sent, Pianell underestimated the king's willingness to resist. When Francis II spoke of leaving the capital, Pianell believed that he would eventually embark on the Spanish steamer Villa di Bilbao and leave for Spain. Similarly, Pianell underestimated the resistance of the remaining loyal Neapolitan troops.

Having obtained leave of absence from the king, he left on September 5 by sea for France where his wife had relatives and where he spent several months nearly until the proclamation of the Kingdom of Italy. On March 2, 1861, with the Kingdom of the Two Sicilies dissolved, Pianell returned to Italy.

=== Major general of the Italian Army (1861-1866) ===
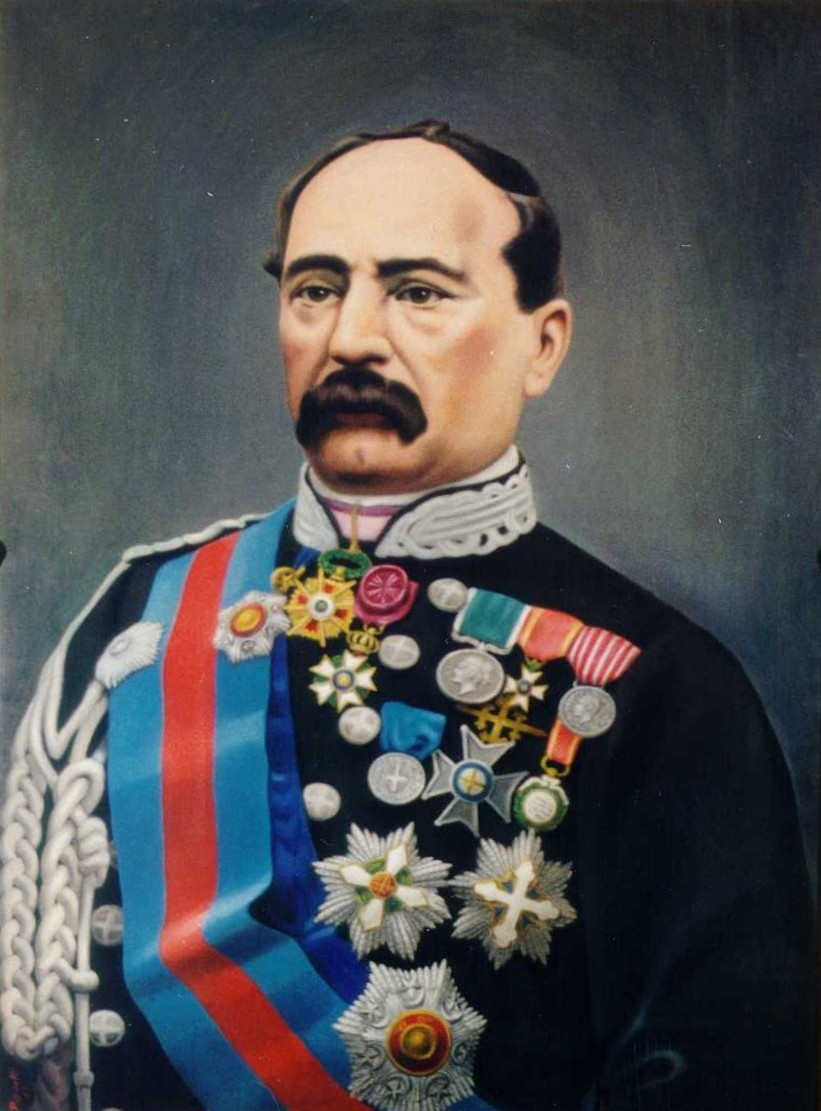
General Manfredo Fanti, probably the closest person to Pianell after his return to Italy in 1861.

Two days after crossing the French-Piedmontese border, on March 4, 1861, Pianell had a long talk with Cavour and the next day with General Manfredo Fanti, who received him under his protection. On March 17 he obtained an appointment as lieutenant general in the Italian Army. In the following days in Milan and Bologna he had long and cordial talks with Alfonso La Marmora and Enrico Cialdini. On June 12 he passed into the active role as Inspector of Infantry.

==== Accused on both sides ====
On August 4, 1861 Pianell was appointed Commander of the Order of Saints Maurice and Lazarus and had to defend himself against the accusations of the Democrats, who considered it inadmissible for a former Bourbon general to be decorated along with Medici, Bixio and Turr. On the other hand, in September, the French newspaper L'Ami de la Réligion accused Pianell and another former Bourbon general, Alessandro Nunziante, of being bribed by the Piedmontese government. Outraged, Pianell responded with a strong letter in the same newspaper rejecting the accusations.

On October 26, 1861, he was appointed commander of the active 7th Division in Forli. The appointment aroused perplexity in some quarters, which did not consider Pianell, a former Bourbon minister who had not immediately joined the national cause, fit for the post. On February 4, 1862, in the Senate, Minister of War Alessandro Della Rovere defended the choice of appointment and together with General Fanti took Pianell's side, confirming the esteem he had for him.

==== Member of Commissions ====
On April 5, 1862 Pianell received the Cross of Grand Officer of the Order of Saints Maurice and Lazarus. In May he left for Turin as a member of the Commission for the Revision of the Recruitment Law, and on November 17 he passed to command the 19th Division in Alessandria. In August 1863 he was included in the Commission for the Revision of the Military Penal Code and assigned to inspect the commands in Alessandria, Genoa and Turin. In October he was a member of the Commission for the Revision of Honors and in February 1864 a member of a second Commission for the Revision of the Military Code.

==== Toward the Battle of Custoza ====
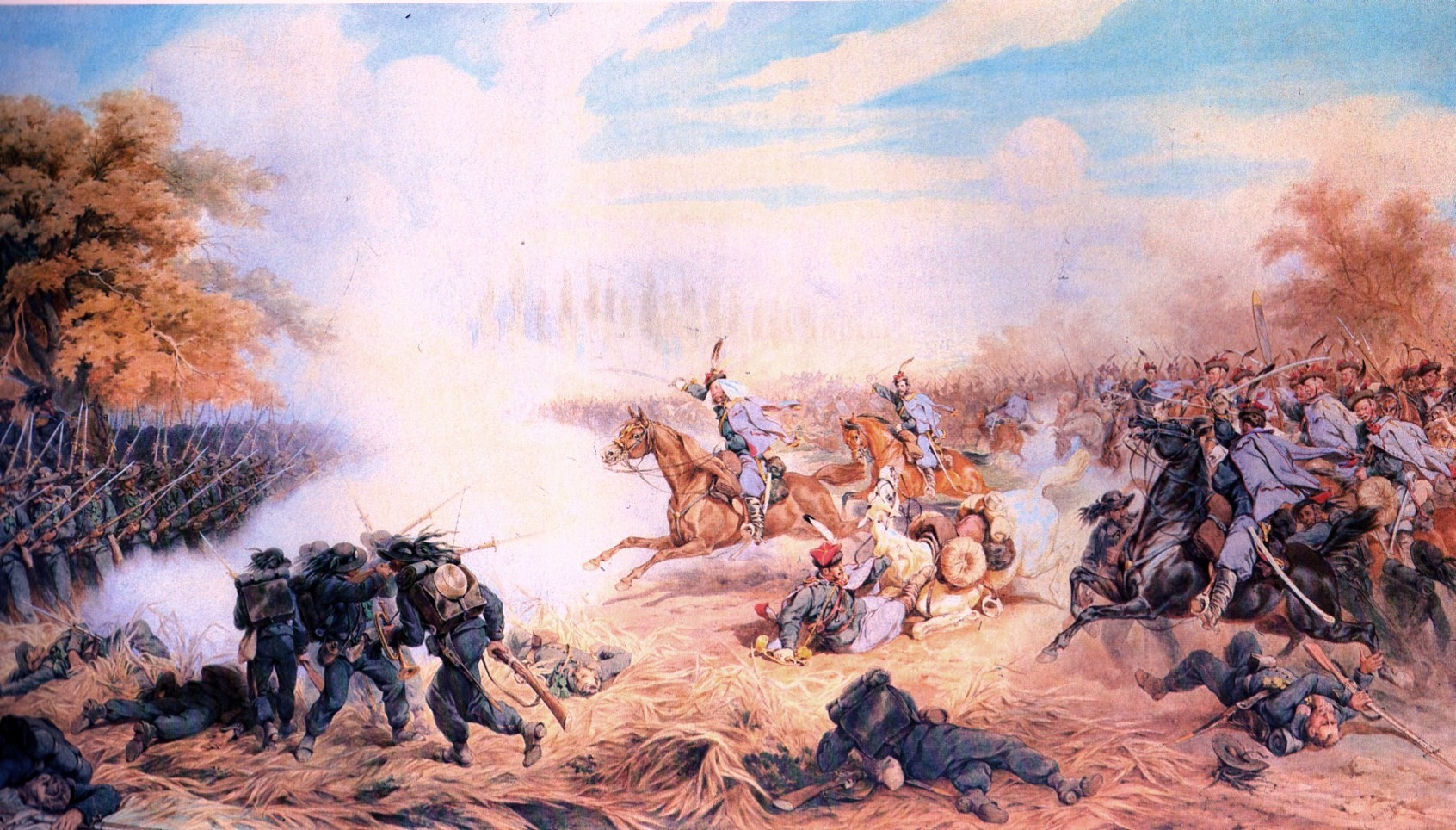
In the Battle of Custoza Pianell was in command of the 2nd Division, the only one, among the Italian divisions involved in the center of the battle, that held the position.

After the alliance with Prussia was concluded, in April 1866 Italy prepared to attack Austria. On May 4 Pianell received command of the 2nd Division of General Giovanni Durando's Army Corps, stationed in Lodi.

A few weeks before the start of hostilities, along with the other former Bourbon general Alessandro Nunziante, Pianell fell victim to a plan, probably hatched in papal Rome, that was aimed at fomenting unrest in the Italian Army's divisions. False reports were spread among the soldiers that General Nunziante had been shot for treason and Pianell had been arrested on the charge that he intended to hand over his division to the Austrians at the first opportunity.

At the opening of hostilities on June 23, 1866, Pianell, with the 2nd Division deployed just north of Monzambano, had no orders other than to contain the Austrian garrison at the fortress of Peschiera, should it come out, and to protect the left flank of the rest of the 1st Army Corps that would cross the Mincio.

Some Austrian outposts were made to fall back into the fortress; positions were taken on the road by which the Austrians could have attacked; and the other units of the 1st Corps crossed, undisturbed, the river.

The next day, across the Mincio River, Italian troops clashed with Austrian troops. In the confusion only 7 divisions out of 21 deployed for the war by the Italians took part in the battle. Nevertheless, some Austrian divisions fell back to Verona, but all the Italian divisions engaged beat a retreat, often ruinous, in the face of the enemy counteroffensive.

==== Custoza (June 24, 1866) ====
Although distant, noticing the beginning of the battle, Pianell took the initiative by advancing several battalions and ordering the "Siena" Brigade to march on Monzambano. At the same time a large number of straggling soldiers from the other divisions were arriving from the eastern bank of the Mincio. Pianell, always holding his positions on the bridge road to guard against an attack from Peschiera, organized to drain off the fugitives and have the "Siena" Brigade cross the river and take up position east of Monzambano.

Soon after, his Cavalleggeri Guide divisions attacked the slopes of Monte Rosso suffering heavy losses but putting the Croatian troops positioned there to flight. Turning his attention back to the infantry, noticing a hesitation in the 5th Regiment, Pianell joined it in the front line and reinvigorated its confidence. So did the 6th, which was repulsed three times by the Austrians, but which reached Pianell finding victory: the advanced troops of General Rupprecht's Austrian reserve division were put to flight or surrendered.

Pianell's 2nd Division, which was nevertheless later ordered to fall back, was the only Italian division engaged in the Battle of Custoza to hold its position (on both sides of the Mincio River) and repel enemy forces that might have outflanked the left flank of the deployment. Pianell captured 560 Austrians including 8 officers and enabled and escorted the retreat from the 1st Division. As General Durando was wounded, he assumed command of the 1st Army Corps as the senior division general on June 25, 1866.

Alfonso La Marmora, commander of the army where Pianell's division was framed, admitted in his report the valor of the former Bourbon general: "The retreat was carried out without disorder, contributing essentially to it the opportune arrangements made by Generals Durando and Pianell. General Pianell [...] alerted to the unfavorable turn of the combat in which the division [of General Enrico] Cerale was engaged, on his own initiative made a brigade with four pieces [of artillery] cross the Mincio, and arrived in time to stop the march of enemy columns that intended to turn to the left. He drove them back and took several hundred prisoners."

=== General of Army Corps (1866-1892) ===
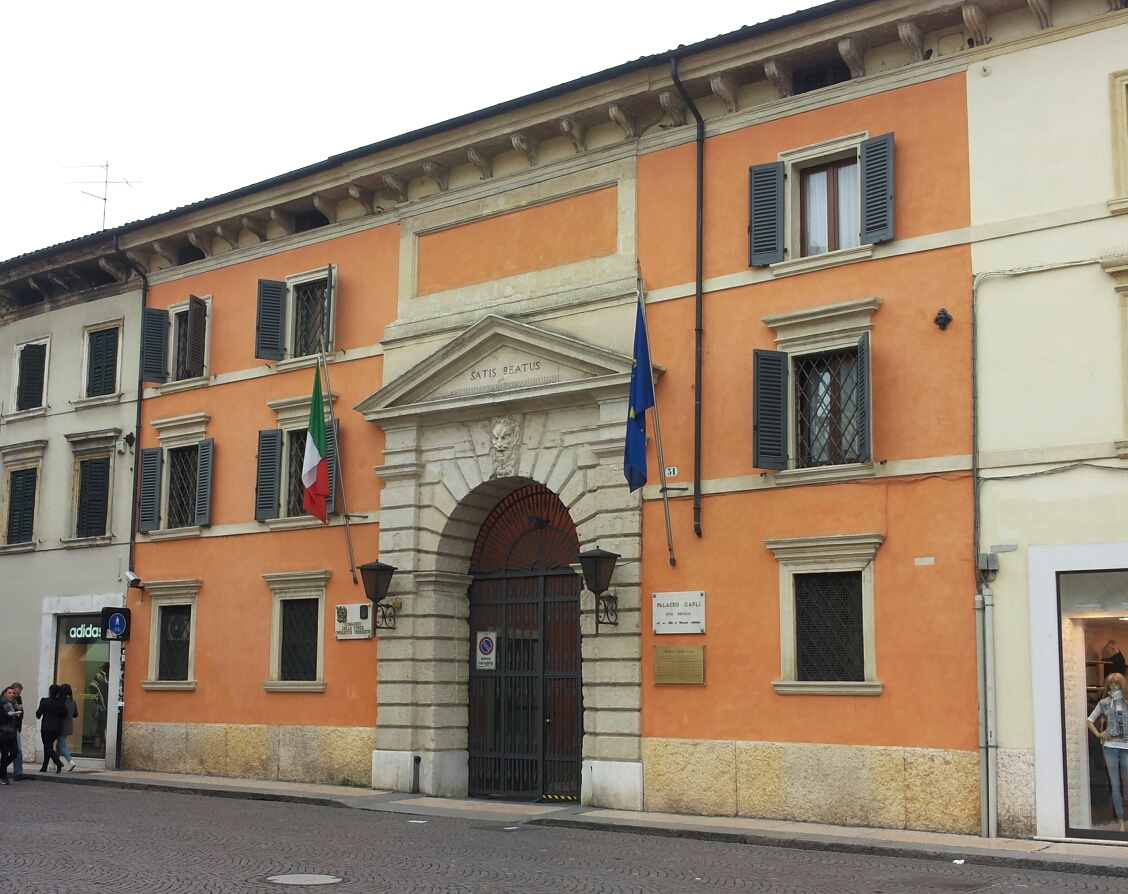
Palazzo Carli in Verona, seat of military command, Pianell's residence and place of death.

The undertaking of Monzambano spread throughout Italy and even beyond the Alps the fame of Pianell, who became one of the symbols of national unity. At the same time, the feat served to offset, at least in part, Italy's loss of prestige due to the defeat at Custoza.

Continuing the state of war, the problem of the Austrian prisoners became burdensome in September 1866, whose distressing conditions were improved by Pianell, who had meanwhile moved his command to Treviso. The prisoners were moved to more spacious quarters, the ration was reorganized, arrangements were made for improved hygienic conditions, and they were provided with necessary clothing. A bocce court and other amusements to pass the time were even arranged.

At the end of hostilities (October 3, 1866) due to agreements made earlier with France, Austria had to cede Venetia to Italy, and Pianell's 1st Army Corps was given the task of occupying the region. In mid-October Pianell was appointed commander of the Department of Verona (rank corresponding to General of Army Corps), and on November 7, 1866, he took part in the ceremonies of Victor Emmanuel II's takeover of Venice. A month later he was decorated with the Cross of Grand Officer of the Military Order of Savoy for the initiative taken at the Battle of Custoza. On the same day, December 8, he refused Cialdini's offer to him of the post of Minister of War.

==== Deputy ====
On May 17, 1867, Pianell's election to the Chamber of Deputies for the seat of the 1st College of Naples (Chiaia District) was validated by ballot. He began, therefore, to participate in parliamentary work in Florence, then the capital of the Kingdom. Joining the Historical Right, he fought, in vain, against the abolition of the Army's territorial Grand Commands and the Ecclesiastical Axis Law. Although, then, the government headed by Leftist Rattazzi, accepted his proposals to enhance troop training.

==== The trip to Central Europe ====
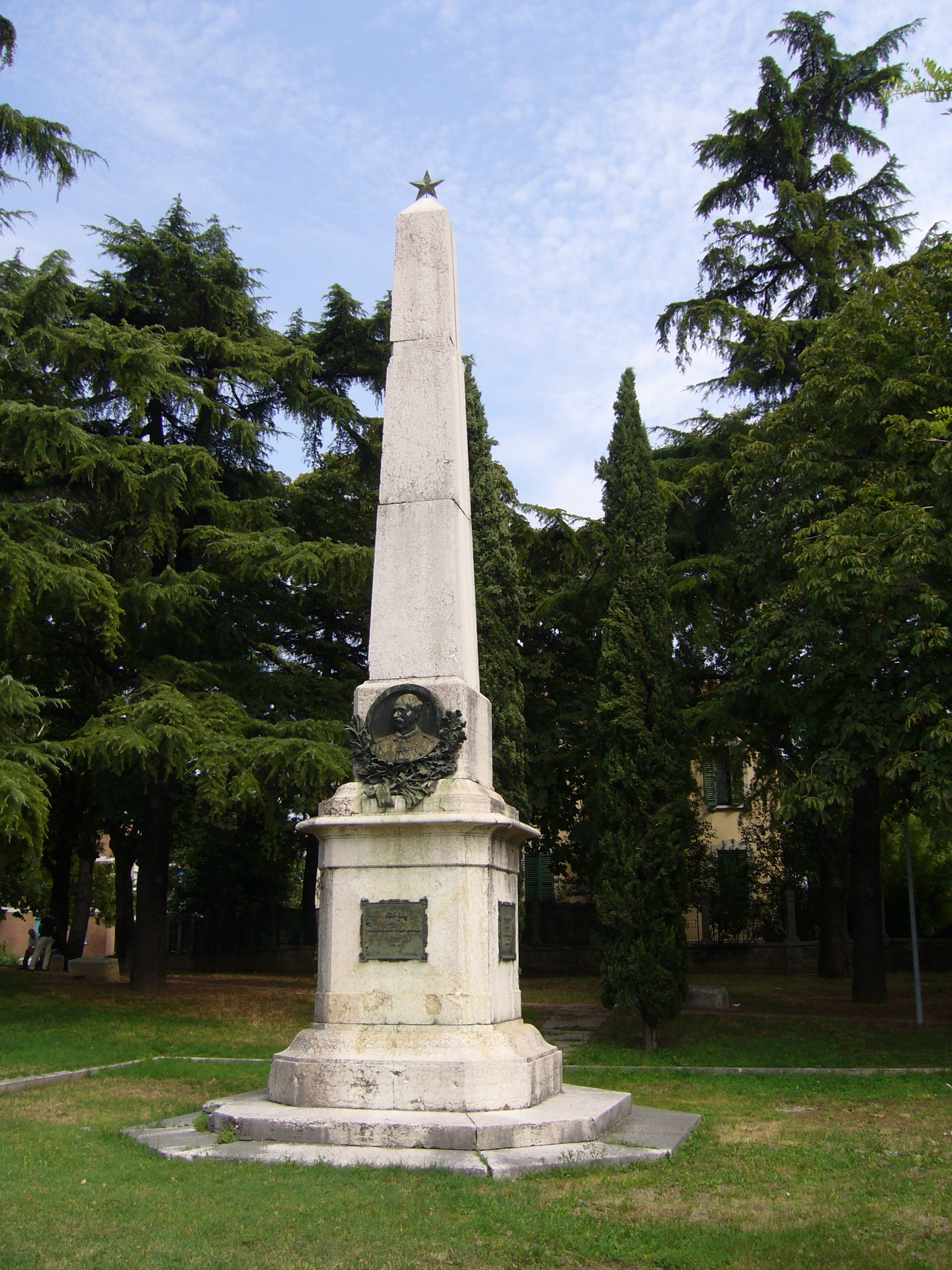
The monument to Pianell erected in Verona's Via Piave gardens.

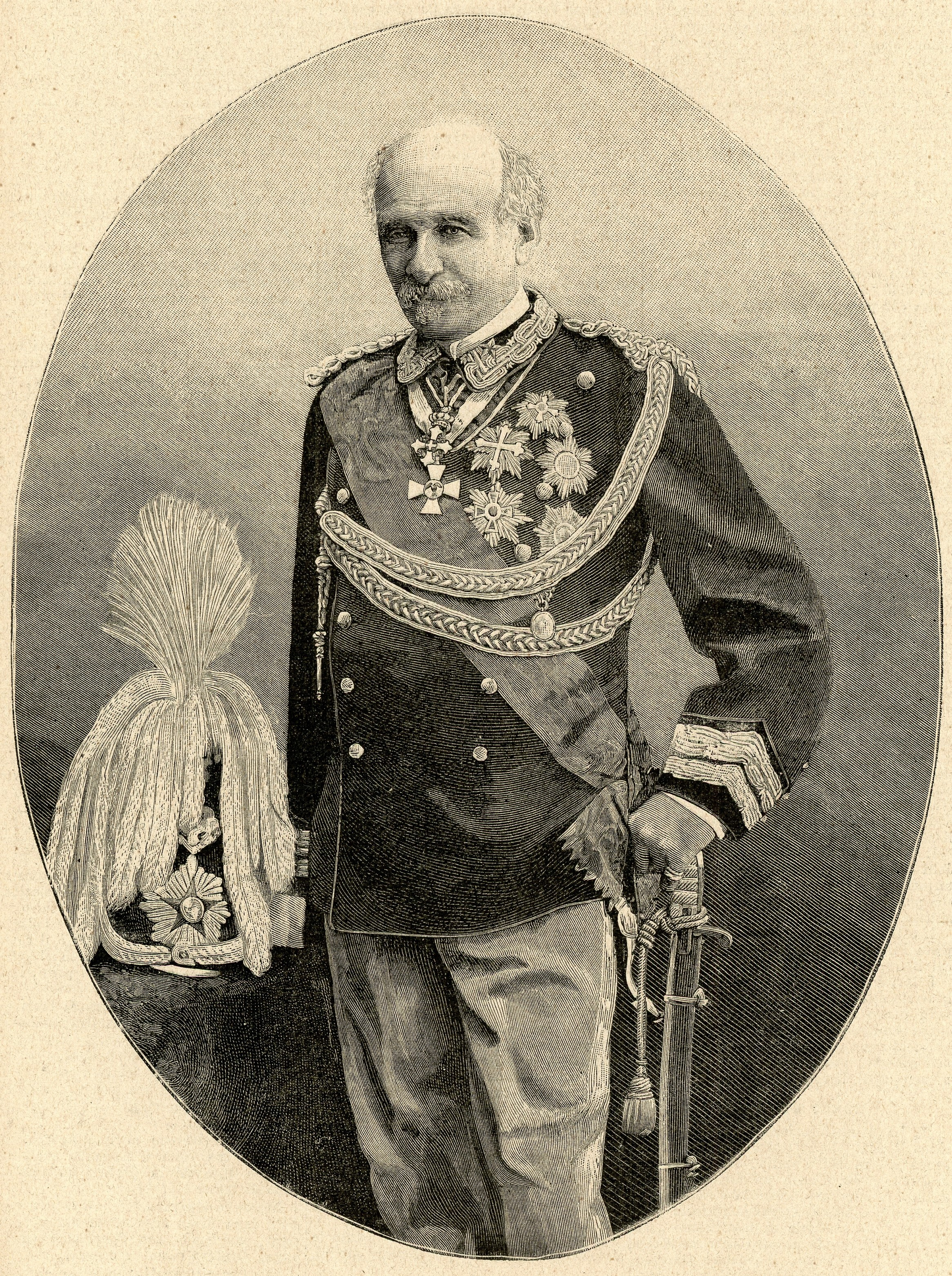
Pianell commanding forces in northern Italy

After receiving from Austria the title of Commander of the Imperial Order of Leopold in March 1867, and also turning down Menabrea's offer of the post to Minister of War (October 1867), Pianell, in the summer of 1868, left for a trip of military interest to Austria and Prussia.

The general began the trip in Munich and proceeded to Steyr, Austria, where he visited rifle factories. On July 23 in Vienna he met War Minister Kuhn and in the following days visited the large Franz-Joseph barracks, the Geographical Office, the Central Cavalry School, and the Arsenal, where he became interested in the Gatling gun, the forerunner of the machine gun.

In early August he witnessed the maneuvers of the Hussars, and in Tulln he visited the Engineer Barracks and a railroad plant. In the following days he traveled to Budapest, Prague, and Dresden. On August 26, 1868, he arrived in Berlin, where on the 31st he witnessed, the first Italian general, the maneuvers of the Prussian Army, which surprised him by their vivacity and precision. On the same day he was received by both King Wilhelm and the heir to the throne Frederick, who had liberal ideas, with whom he held long and cordial talks and with whom he left in mid-September to attend military maneuvers in Pomerania for three days.

Back in Verona Pianell, in late November, was awarded the Prussian Order of the Red Eagle, 1st class.

==== Commander of the forces in northern Italy ====
As part of the reorganization of military units, Pianell was notified on July 2, 1869, of his appointment as commander of the 2nd Army Corps, with jurisdiction over all of northern Italy. On January 14, 1870, the general went on an institutional trip to Naples, where, with Prince Umberto, he attended a gala evening at the Royal Palace, the former home of the Bourbons, on February 7. Back in Verona, as the Franco-Prussian War broke out, Pianell was urgently summoned to Florence to replace War Minister Govone, who had had serious nervous problems; once again he firmly refused. After the seizure of Rome in November 1870, Pianell suffered a defeat in the elections for the Chamber of Deputies in Naples, but in 1871 he was appointed senator for life at the behest of Victor Emmanuel II.

==== Last years ====
In 1882 Pianell, as commander of the Northern Italian forces, successfully organized and led relief efforts for the Verona and Polesine floods. In gratitude, the Verona city council appointed him an honorary citizen, and in 1887 he was awarded the highest honor of the Kingdom of Italy: the Collar of the Most Holy Annunciation. He asked for, but was never granted, a leave of absence.

He fulfilled, then, his duty to the very end: on March 20, 1892, on the occasion of the annual parade in Verona for King Umberto I's birthday, despite the persistent rain, he stood motionless on horseback waiting for all the departments involved to parade. A few days later, in his apartment in Palazzo Carli, also the seat of the military headquarters, he took to his bed with bronchitis, and on April 5, 1892, after receiving his last rites, he died among his family, at just over 73 years of age.

== Honors ==
=== Bourbon honors ===
Order of Saint Ferdinand and of Merit - ribbon for ordinary uniform

Order of Saint Ferdinand and of Merit

Order of Saint George of the Reunion - ribbon for ordinary uniform

Order of Saint George of the Reunion

Royal Order of Francis I - ribbon for ordinary uniform

Royal Order of Francis I

=== Savoy honors ===
Supreme Order of the Most Holy Annunciation - ribbon for ordinary uniform

Supreme Order of the Most Holy Annunciation

Order of Saints Maurice and Lazarus - ribbon for ordinary uniform

Order of Saints Maurice and Lazarus

Military Order of Savoy - ribbon for ordinary uniform

Military Order of Savoy
— December 6, 1866

Commemorative Medal of the Unity of Italy - ribbon for ordinary uniform

Commemorative Medal of the Unity of Italy

Order of the Crown of Italy - ribbon for ordinary uniform

Order of the Crown of Italy

=== Foreign honors ===
Order of Leopold (Austria) - ribbon for ordinary uniform

Order of Leopold (Austria)

Order of the Red Eagle - ribbon for ordinary uniform

Order of the Red Eagle

== Works by Pianell ==
- Giuseppe Salvatore Pianell, Le grandi manovre autunnali del II corpo d'esercito nell'anno 1869, istruzioni alle truppe e rapporto al Ministero della Guerra, del luogotenente generale conte Pianell, Carlo Voghera, Firenze, 1870.
- Giuseppe Salvatore Pianell, Le grandi manovre dell'anno 1871. Rapporto del luogotenente generale conte Pianell, Carlo Voghera, Roma, 1872.
- Giuseppe Salvatore Pianell, I corpo d'armata di manovra : ordine del giorno generale n. 1, G. Vianini, Verona, 1878.
- Giuseppe Salvatore Pianell, Relazione sommaria sulle esercitazioni d'assedio intorno a Verona nel Luglio 1887, Carlo Voghera, Roma, 1887.
- Giuseppe Salvatore Pianell, Lettere del generale Pianell e Ricordi familiari, Francesco Giannini e Figli, Napoli, 1901.
- Giuseppe Salvatore Pianell e Eleonora Pianell Ludolf, Il generale Pianell. Memorie (1859-1892), Firenze, G. Barbera, 1902.

== Bibliography ==
- Carbonelli di Letino, Salvatore (1871). Lettera all'onorevolissimo signore luogotenente generale Pianell. Napoli: Stab. Tip. Dell'Unione.
- Ferrarelli, Giuseppe (1901). Lettere del generale Pianell e ricordi familiari. Roma: Forzani e C.
- Lampertico, Fedele (1901). Il generale Pianell. Firenze: Ufficio della rassegna nazionale.
- Quandel-Vial, Ludovico (1901). Annotazioni al libro Lettere del generale Pianell e ricordi familiari in quanto si riferisce in esso per gli avvenimenti calabri del 1860. Napoli: Artigianelli.
- de Felissent, Giangiacomo (1902). Il generale Pianell e il suo tempo. Verona: F.lli Drucker.
- Corsi, Carlo (1903). Confutazioni alle lettere del generale G. S. Pianell e ricordi familiari della contessa Eleonora Ludolf-Pianell ed all'opera Il generale Pianell ed il suo tempo del capitano Giangiacomo Felissent. Napoli: Salvatore Batelli.
- Salvemini, Gaetano (1904). Il generale Pianell nella crisi napoletana del 1860. Messina: D'Amico.
- Battaglini, Tito (1913). Il generale Pianell in Abruzzo nel 1859-60. Città di Castello: Unione arti grafiche.
- Pagano, Salvatore (1915). Il generale Pianell e l'addestramento delle truppe. Roma: E. Voghera.
- Fettarappa Sandri, Carlo (1938). Il generale Salvatore Pianell. Milano: O. Zucchi.

=== On the historical context ===
- de Cesare, Raffaele (1969). La fine di un regno. Milano: Longanesi & C.
- Giusto Jaeger, Pier (1982). Francesco II di Borbone. L'ultimo re di Napoli. Milano: Mondadori.
- Acton, Harold (1997). Gli ultimi Borboni di Napoli (1825-1861). Firenze: Giunti. ISBN 88-09-21256-8.
