= Army of the Two Sicilies =

Land forces of the Kingdom of the Two Sicilies, from 1734 to 1861

- Armata delle Due Sicilie (Italian); Armata dî Doi Sicilî (Sicilian)
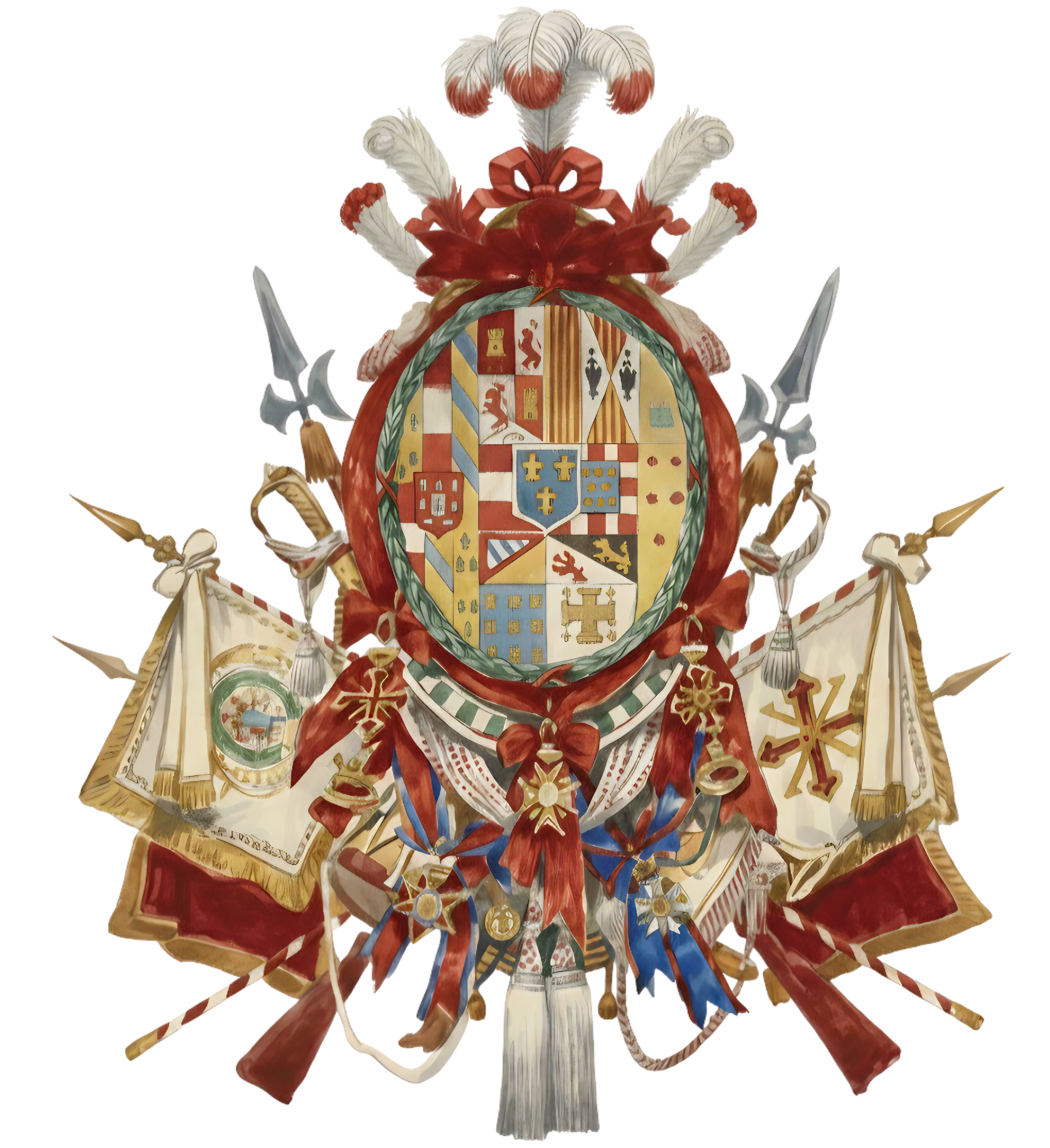
- Coat of Arms of the Army of the Two Sicilies
- Active: 1734–1861
- Country: Kingdom of the Two Sicilies
- Allegiance: House of Bourbon-Two Sicilies
- Branch: Army
- Type: Infantry, Cavalry, Artillery, Engineers
- Size: 100,000 soldiers in peace 138,000 soldiers in war
- Garrison/HQ: 50,000
- March: Inno al Re
- Engagements: Sicilian Revolution of 1848; Expedition of the Thousand

Commanders
- Current commander: Guglielmo Pepe
- Ceremonial chief: Florestano Pepe
- Colonel of the Regiment: Carlo Filangieri
- Command Sergeant Major: Vito Nunziante
- Commander: Paolo Avi
- Commander: Girolamo Calà Ulloa
- Commander: Carlo Afan de Rivera
- Commander: Giosuè Ritucci
- Commander: Felix von Schumacher

Insignia
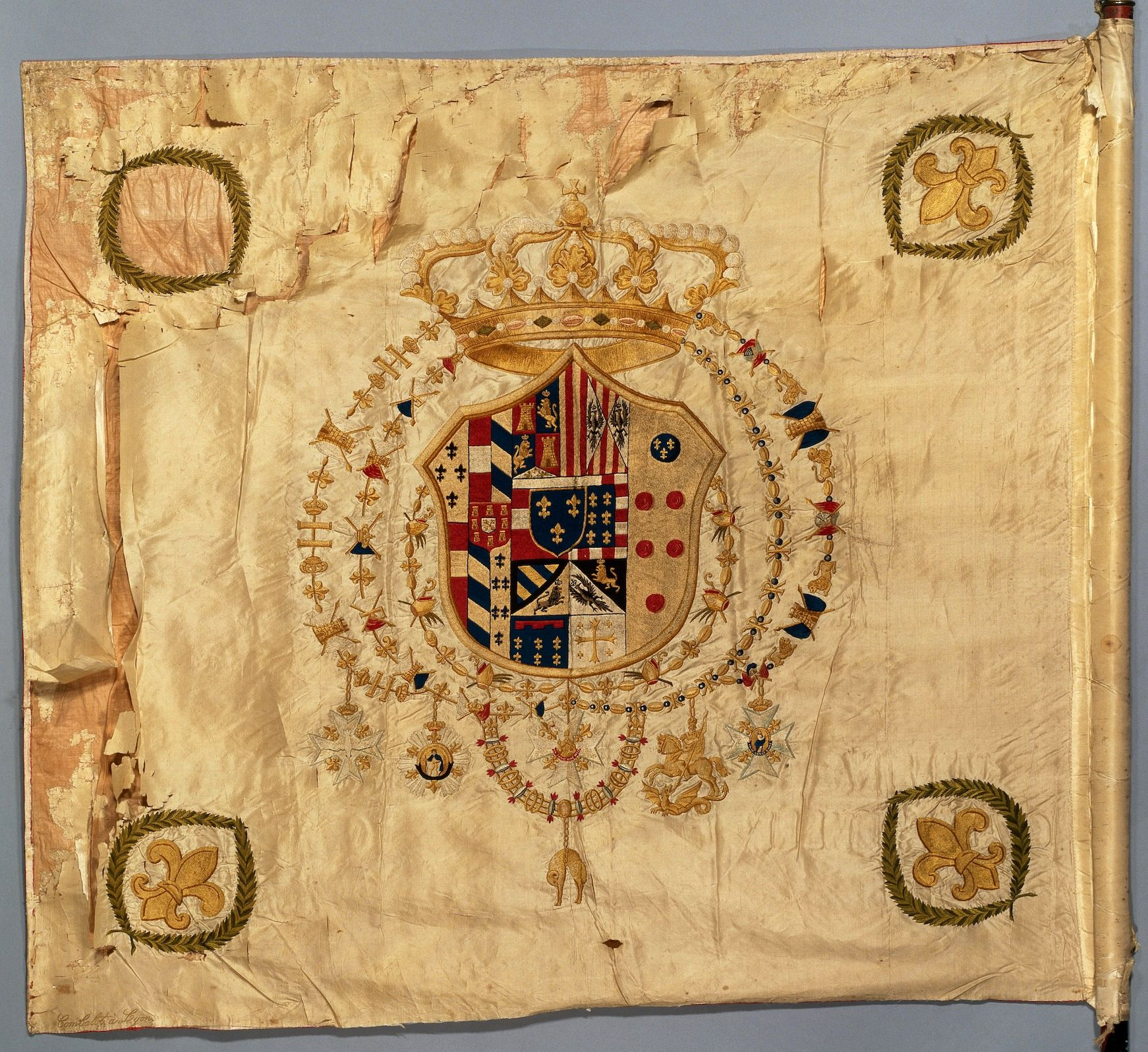
- Flag

The Army of the Two Sicilies, also known as the Royal Army of His Majesty the King of the Kingdom of the Two Sicilies (Reale Esercito di Sua Maestà il Re del Regno delle Due Sicilie), the Bourbon Army (Esercito Borbonico) or the Neapolitan Army (Esercito Napoletano), was the land forces of the Kingdom of the Two Sicilies, whose armed forces also included a navy. It was in existence from 1734 to 1861. It was the land armed force of the new independent state created by the settlement of the Bourbon dynasty in southern Italy following the events of the War of the Polish Succession.

== History ==
Although the Royal Army arose only in 1734, the Neapolitan and Sicilian military institutions boast a much older history, which lays its foundations in the organization of a "state" army (i.e. state and no longer feudal) by Ferdinand I of Naples in 1464. In particular, during the Spanish period (1504–1714) customs used by Aragon in Sicily mixed old military traditions from the Norman, Arab, and Byzantine periods. All of these different cultures profoundly marked the military customs of the later Bourbon period. It can be seen in many examples of military clothing including items, such as the Turban which dated back to Emirate of Sicily. During this time the soldiers of southern Italy were in fact involved in almost all the military events of the Spanish Empire (from the Wars of Charles V to the Wars of Flanders, from colonial campaigns in America to the Thirty Years' War), often showing great value and loyalty to the Spanish government. The captains, belonging to the best feudal nobility of the Neapolitan and Sicilian provinces, were able to frame and prepare the subjects of the two vice-kingdoms for war, obeying the firm political direction given by the monarchs of Spain.

The story of this army naturally fits into the same space of time in which the dynasty of which it was supported lived: from 1734 to 1861.

=== Charles de Bourbon ===
1734, the year in which the expeditionary force of Charles of Bourbon conquered the Neapolitan provinces and the following year the Kingdom of Sicily, tearing them from the Austrian viceroyalty, also marked the creation of the first entirely "national" regiments, flanked by the Spanish regiments with which Infante Don Carlo had descended in Italy.

=== Ferdinand I ===
In the later Bourbon period, however, with the reconquest of independence, the nobility gradually lost this military character, giving way to the new centralizing policy of a dynastic imprint. The goal of the Bourbons was in fact to replace loyalty to the old noble commanders, who had served the Habsburgs for over 200 years, with an exasperated fidelity to the new national crown. This progressive disunity from the obsolete Iberian traditions, promoted by the reforms desired by Ferdinand I of the Two Sicilies, provoked in the eighteenth century a state of "disorientation" within the Bourbon military institutions that resulted in an almost frenetic sequence of restructuring and reform. Sir John Acton, 6th Baronet was involved with the reforms.

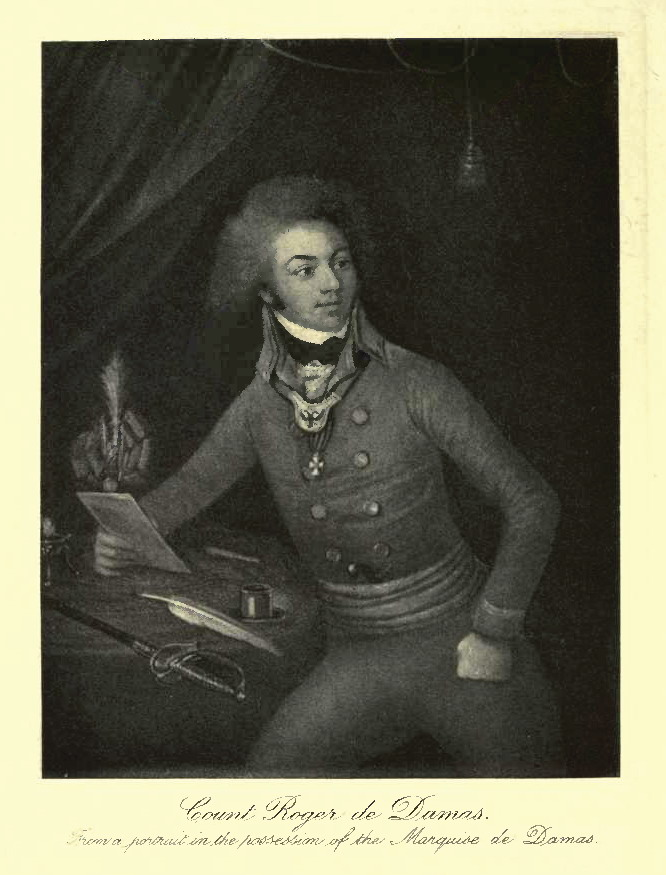
General Roger de Damas, commander of the troops from 1799 to 1806

Ferdinand ascended the throne in 1759. He was briefly exiled from the mainland to Sicily in 1799, and then from 1806 to 1815. He was restored for the last 10 years of his life.

==== Murat and Naples ====
The army in mainland Italy collapsed in 1806, and Joachim Murat created from scratch an army for the Kingdom of Naples based on French drill manuals and uniforms. Following Murat's fall from power, the mainland troops were integrated into King Ferdinand I's army.

==== Sicily ====
At the time of the Parthenopaean Republic, Ferdinand IV in 1799 during his presence in Sicily limited himself to reorganizing the scarce forces present in Sicily, organizing them into three infantry regiments, to which he gave the names of Val di Mazzara, Val di Noto and Val Demone, three of cavalry and one of artillery, increasing their pay.

In 1806, the Bourbon army in Naples had disintegrated as a consequence of the French invasion. In 1808, 952 officers and 13,821 enlisted men were stationed on Sicily to defend the island and the king from the Napoleonic forces commanded by Murat. The city militias (Miliziotti) were disbanded that year and reconstituted as 9 territorial infantry, 23 light infantry and 4 dragoon regiments, each commanded by a colonel, which formed the Royal Sicilian Volunteer Army, commanded by Leopold, Prince of Salerno.

The British, with the involvement of Lord Bentinck, who protected the island from the French, also created a regiment of Sicilian volunteers, the Royal Sicilian Regiment.

However, following the establishment in December 1816 of the Kingdom of the Two Sicilies with the formal merger of the two kingdoms of Naples and Sicily, this armed force was deeply reorganised, incorporating also the elements of Murat's former Neapolitan army of the Napoleonic era. This led to resentment from Sicilian members of the army, and caused many of them to join rebels during the Sicilian revolution of 1848. The final organisation, in accordance with the norms of Murat's style, ultimately established an army of 47,000 men, with 52 infantry battalions and 24 cavalry squadrons composed of 4,800 horses. Another 5,000 men belonged to the artillery and train, for a grand total of 56,000 men.

From 1817, therefore, the official name of Royal Army of His Majesty the King of the Kingdom of the Two Sicilies was adopted; the latter, together with the Army of the Sea, constituted the armed forces of the Kingdom of the Two Sicilies.

Following the constitutional revolt of 1820 by the army, and its defeat on 7 March 1821 by Austrian troops, the King temporarily disbanded the army, which was believed to be largely contaminated by Carbonari infiltration, and abolished compulsory conscription. It was therefore decided to leave the defence of the Kingdom to the Austrian occupation forces for some time.

=== Francis I ===
Upon the death of Ferdinand I (4 January 1825), his son Francis decided to renounce the protection of Austria, whose troops, which had come to the aid of the Bourbon monarchy during the constitutional uprisings of 1821, still remained in the kingdom at the expense of the government of Naples. The Austrian troops left Sicily in April 1826 and the continental provinces in January-February 1827. To compensate for the dismissal of the Austrian troops, the sovereign decided to establish four regiments of professional Swiss soldiers, with the aim of forming a solid nucleus of troops completely unconnected to the political affairs of the Kingdom.

=== Ferdinand II ===
This restless evolution of the military structures of the Two Sicilies stopped only with the 1830 accession of Ferdinand II of the Two Sicilies, who finally managed to stabilize and rationalize the military systems of the kingdom, giving it a definitively national and dynastic imprint. However, the evolution of the European and Neapolitan political framework of those last 30 years, which fully involved the army of the Two Sicilies, caused political dissent to turn directly against the same Bourbon ruling house.

Ferdinand's promised to send a Corps of 25,000 men, to participate in the First Italian War of Independence. This contingent did not leave on time and when it was sent in March 1848 it contained around 11,000 men. His highest priority was the reconquest of Sicily, which had revolted on 26 March 1848 under the leadership of Ruggero Settimo. Commanded by Guglielmo Pepe, the Neapolitan troops arrived in the theatre of war only in mid-May, when, as they were crossing the Po from the south, they received the order to return home.

=== Francis II ===
Francis II of the Two Sicilies, the last ruler of the Kingdom of the Two Sicilies, unlike his father, lacked military expertise. During the first years of his reign, a revolt of the Swiss Regiments broke out on 7 July 1859.

== Uniforms in the Army of the Two Sicilies ==
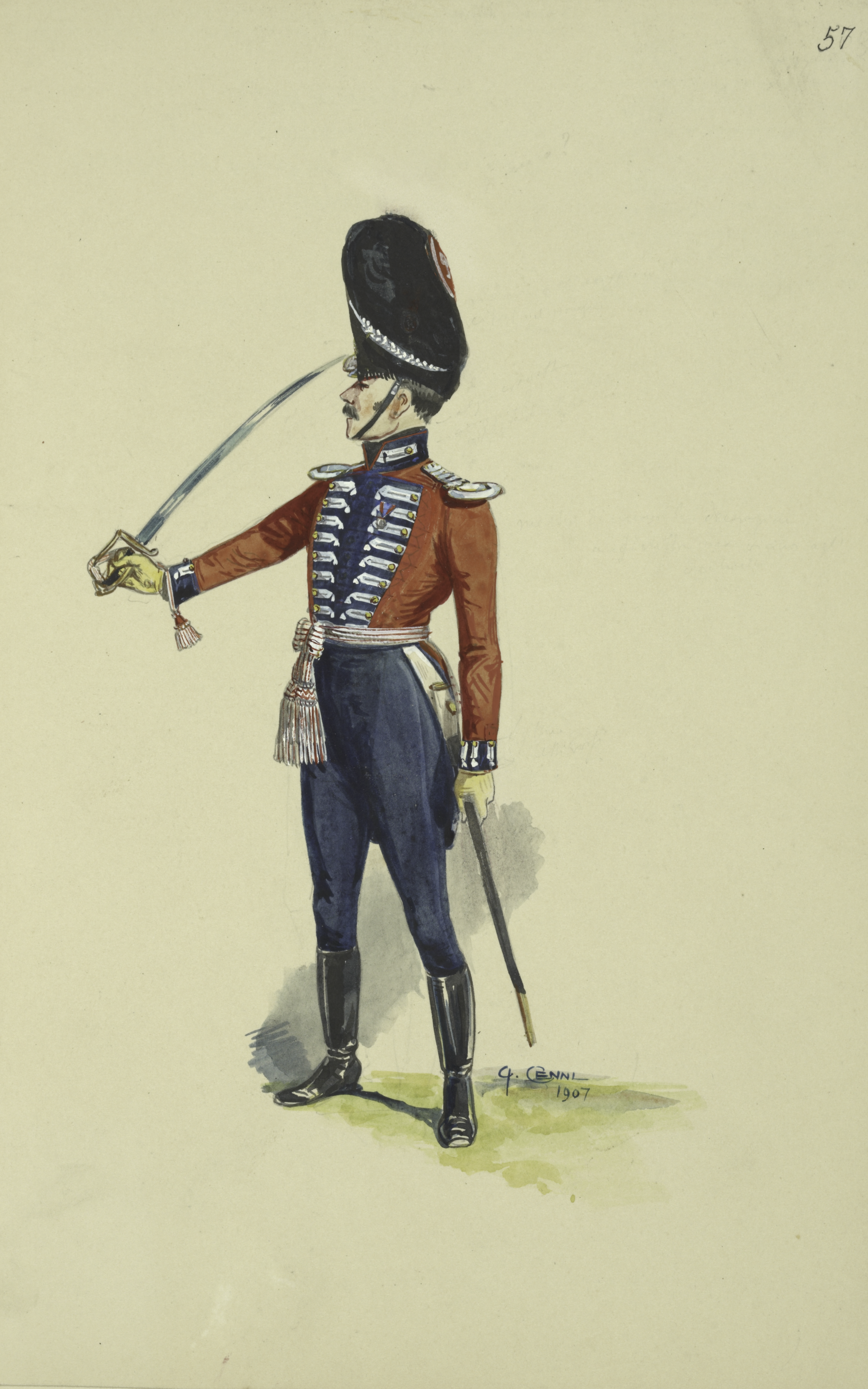
A warrant officer of the Royal Grenadiers in parade dress, 1815

The first uniforms of the Royal Army were Spanish in type, in accordance with the Ordinance of 1728. The oldest source able to give us an idea of the first Neapolitan uniforms is the Ordinance of 1744 on the constitution of the 12 provincial regiments: the soldiers of these regiments had to be equipped with a knee-length "jacket", a "jaguar" (waistcoat with sleeves) just short of the javelin, knee-length breeches, gaiters that exceeded knee height (the cavalry was equipped with spur boots), a white shirt and a black tie. The attire was complemented by a black felt tricorn with a red cockade on the left wing. Some details of the uniforms (buttons, lapels, embroidery, buffeterie, type of turban, and colours in general) varied depending on the rank and department (the officers, for example, were traditionally equipped with a goliera on which the Bourbon lilies were imprinted).

In the 1770s, some novelties were introduced: the jackets were considerably shortened and the uniforms streamlined.

With the decade of French rule in Naples in the early Nineteenth Century there were countless evolutions also with regard to uniforms: at first the Napoleonic French style was followed, but then the Neapolitan army was given a strong local imprint, especially at the behest of Murat, who had a passion for uniforms. Concurrently, the Austrian, then the English, influence is seen on those units from the island of Sicily. The buttons on the tunics of the Foreign Regiment were framed across the chest with lace, in the same manner as tunics of their British allies.

The innovations brought by Murat were partly preserved after the Napoleonic Wars, undergoing evolutions dictated mainly by the Germanic fashions of the time. From 1830, the Bourbon uniform was redesigned on the basis of the French "Luigi Filippo" (Louis Philippe I) style; the son-in-law of the late King Ferdinand. From then until the fall of the kingdom the French influence remained evident in almost all Bourbon equipment.

The uniforms of the Lancers and Hussars were almost completely identical to those of the similar specialties of the French army. The renowned bandsmen of the Neapolitan army had traditionally rich and refined clothing.

== Troops in Foreign Regiments ==
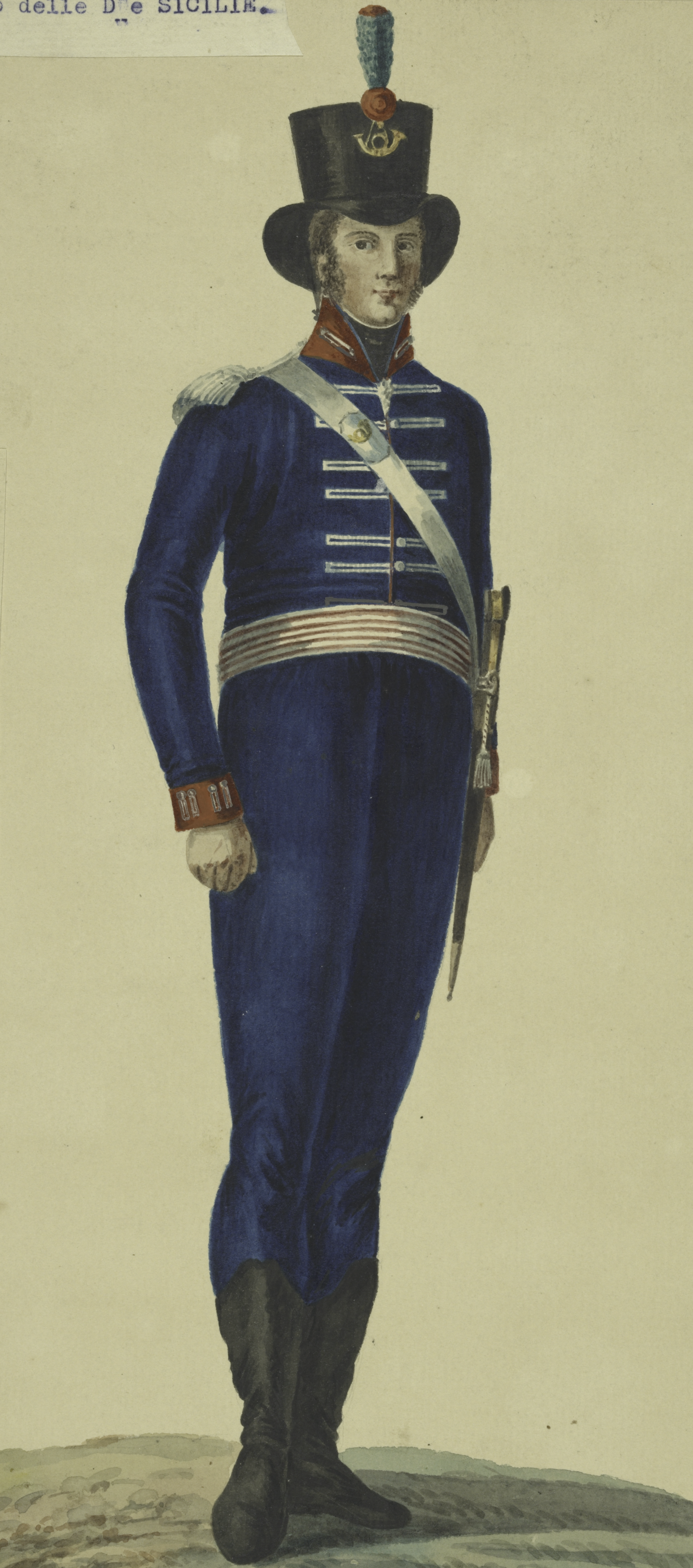
Officer of a Sicilian foreign regiment's light infantry company, 1807

The Royal Army had foreign regiments since its in origin, in particular Albanians and Swiss (in addition to the Walloon and Irish regiments, who had arrived in the wake of Charles of Bourbon).

In 1737 an Albanian regiment was formed, called "Macedonia", thanks to the intercession of the Primate of Epirus residing in Naples, which recruited its compatriots in competition with the Venetian regiments oltremarini in Corfu and Epirus. Later an attempt was made to extend recruitment also to the indigenous Albanian communities of southern Italy and Sicily, however by the end of the 1700s the Regiment "Albania" had become a truly foreign regiment in which soldiers of the most diverse nationalities converged. Characteristic of the equipment of the Albanian regiments was the "cangiarro", a short sabre of Ottoman derivation (kandjar). The two battalions of the Albanian regiment were to fight alongside the British at the Battle of Castalla. (Note: 'The "Albanian" regiment.... fought more or less well in 1805 as two separate "cacciatori" battalions (by ethnicity Albanian and Macedonian) and then followed Ferdinand to Sicily. Renamed "Foreign Regiment", they operated with Lord Bentinck in 1812.... The [Swiss/German foreign] regiment seems to have disbanded in 1806 after the victory of the French.')

In 1817 a Macedonian Light Infantry battalion was formed, from the former personnel of the 1st Regiment Greek Light Infantry which had been in British service. Richard Church was the commanding officer. It was disbanded in 1820.

Swiss regiments were already present in 1734 (However less numerous) at the Bourbon conquest of the realm among the troops of King Charles, ceded by Spain to the young king. The Neapolitan Swiss corps were temporarily dissolved in 1790, but already in 1799 a new foreign regiment was created called "Alemagna", to be staffed by the Swiss mercenaries and those just arrived from across the Alps (as well as Germans, Italians, Swabian and other foreigners). This foreign regiment however was disbanded following the French invasion of Naples.

Each regiment in accordance with Bourbon regulations consisted of a general staff of 20 officers, a headquarters of 17 soldiers in support of two battalions, each consisting of 24 officers and 684 soldiers divided into 4 fusilier companies and 2 elite companies, 1 of Grenadiers and the other of light infantry. The constitutional revolt of 1820 broke out was finally accepted by Ferdinand I. The constitutional Neapolitan army, commanded by Guglielmo Pepe, was defeated at Antrodoco on 7 March 1821 by Austrian troops, finally forcing Ferdinand I to revoke the constitution. Following the Austrian occupation of the Realm, the King temporarily dismissed the army. It was therefore decided to leave the defence of the Kingdom to the Austrian occupation contingent for some time. The Austrian troops left Sicily in April 1826 and the mainland continental provinces in January–February 1827. To make up for the departure of the Austrian troops, the sovereign decided to set up four regiments of professional Swiss soldiers, with the aim of forming a solid nucleus of troops completely unrelated to the political events of the Realm.

The Royal Army recruited four new Swiss regiments between 1825 and 1830, following the reconstitution of a national army and the capitulations contracted between the Bourbon government, represented by Prince Paolo Ruffo of Castelcicala, and the cantons of the Swiss Confederation. The Swiss recruits accepted employment in the Army of the Two Sicilies voluntarily for a 4-year service, at the end of which they could renew their service for another 2 or 4 years, or take their final leave. The rate of pay was generally higher than that of the locally recruited soldiers of the Royal Army. The official language of the Swiss regiments was German.

In 1859 a revolt broke out among the 3rd Swiss Regiment in Naples. After this controversial event, the Neapolitan government decided to disband the Swiss Regiments and to circumvent the problem of capitulations with Switzerland by creating "Foreign Battalions" open to foreign recruitment. The remaining Swiss soldiers and also many foreign volunteers, particularly from the Kingdom of Bavaria, joined the ranks of these new 4 Foreign Battalions.

== Battles the army was involved in ==
=== War of the Austrian Succession ===
- Battle of Velletri

=== French Revolutionary & Napoleonic Wars ===
- Wars of the First Coalition
- Siege of Toulon
- Wars of the Second Coalition
- Wars of the Third Coalition
- Peninsular War, specifically northeast Spain during 1813
- Battle of Castalla
- Siege of Tarragona (1813)
- Battle of Ordal
- Italian campaign of 1813–1814
- Siege of Genoa (1814)
- Siege of Cattaro

=== 19th Century ===
- First Italian War of Independence

- Battle of the Volturno
- Battle of Garigliano
- Siege of Gaeta

== Composition ==
=== 1734 ===
Halberdier of the Neapolitan Company of the Royal Guard

ROYAL GUARD

Bodyguards

- Halberdier Companies of Naples and Sicily
- Royal Swiss Guards Regiment
- Royal Italian Guards Regiment

INFANTRY

Veteran Regiments

- King
- Queen
- Royal Bourbon
- Real Napoli
- Real Italian
- Real Palermo
- Royal Farnese

Provincial (or National) Regiments

- Real Terra di Lavoro
- Molise
- Calabria Citra
- Calabria Ultra
- Abruzzo Citra
- Abruzzo Ultra
- Capitanata
- Basilicata
- Bari
- Principality of Citra
- Principality Ultra
- Otranto

Sicilian Regiments

- Demon Valley
- Noto Valley
- Mazara Valley

Foreign Regiments

- Jauch (Swiss)
- Wirtz (Swiss)
- Tschoudy (Swiss)
- Hainaut (Walloon)
- Burgundy (Walloon)
- Naumur (Walloon)
- Antwerp (Walloon)
- Real Macedonia (Albanian)

Bersaglieri Regiment

CAVALRY Line Regiments

- King
- Roussillon
- Naples
- Sicily
- Dragoon Regiments
- Queen
- Tarragona
- Bourbon
- Prince

ARTILLERY

- Royal Regiment of Artillery
- Provincial Artillery Companies
- Academy of Artillery

CORPS OF ENGINEERS

VETERANS

=== 1800 to 1806 ===
A Private of the Royal Grenadiers in campaign dress

A Private of the light infantry company of the Royal Guard

Royal Guard

- Garde du Corps
- Halberdiers of Naples (10 March 1800 - February 1806)
- Royal Guards Grenadier Regiment (1 April 1800)
- Russian Grenadier Regiment (24 April, 1800 - January 1802)
- Light Infantry company, renamed as H.R.H's Voltiguers (March 1806 - September 1812)
- The Royal Hunter and Pioneer Corps, mounted and dismounted (May 1806 - May 1815)

Line Infantry (1 September 1799 – 15 March 1806)

- Royal Ferdinand Regiment
- Carolina Regiment I
- Prince Royal Regiment I
- Prince Royal II Regiment (30 September 1800)
- Princess Royal Regiment
- Royal Calabrian Regiment
- Abruzzi Regiment
- Carolina II Regiment
- Royal Samnite Regiment
- Montefusco Regiment (1 September 1799 - 27 April 1801)
- Royal Garrisons Regiment
- German Regiment (Foreign regiment)
- Albania Regiment (Foreign regiment)
- Longone Natural Volunteer Battalion (1799-1801)
- Volunteer Battalion of the Naturalists of Orbetello (1799-1801)
- Company of Naturalists of Ischia (1799-1806)
- Company of Naturalists of Fondi (1804-1806)

Light infantry

- 1st Battalion of Campanian Light Infantry (10 March 1800 - March 1806)
- 2nd Battalion of Apulian Light Infantry (10 March 1800 - February 6, 1808)
- 3rd Battalion of Calabrian Light Infantry (10 March 1800 - March 1806)
- 4th Battalion of Aprutini Light Infantry (10 March 1800 - March 1806)
- 5th Battalion of Albanian Light Infantry (27 February 1798 - June 1812)
- 6th Battalion of Samnite Light Infantry (10 March 1800 - March 1806)
- 7th Battalion of the Samnite Light Infantry II, later Marsi (6 July 1800 - March 1806)
- Mountain Light Infantry Corps (1735)
- City Light Infantry Corps (27 September 1803 - May 27, 1806)

Cavalry Trooper

Sapper and Trooper of the Corpo dei Pionieri e dei Cacciatori Reali

Cavalry

- King's Regiment of Cavalry (September 1799)
- Queen's Regiment of Cavalry (September 1799)
- Royal Prince Regiment I Cavalry (September 1799)
- Royal Prince II Cavalry Regiment (September 1799)
- Royal Princess Cavalry Regiment (September 1799)
- Valdinoto II Cavalry Regiment (6 February 1799)
- Valdimazzara Cavalry Regiment (6 February 1799)
- Light Dragoon Corps (July 1800 - June 1801)

Royal Corps of Artillery

- 1st Regiment of Artillery
- 2nd Regina Artillery Regiment
- Company of Artificers (1788-1806)
- Coastal Artillerymen (25 March 1793)
- Pioneer Brigade (16 October 1798)
- Pontoon Company (16 October 1798)
- Intendance of the artillery train and royal baggage (1800-1806)

4th Sicilian Division (27 October 1801)

- Halberdiers of Palermo
- Valdimazzara Regiment 1st Infantry (6 February 1799 - 16 September 1812)
- Valdimazzara II Infantry Regiment (27 October 1801 - 16 September 1812)
- Valdemone Infantry Regiment (6 February 1799 - 16 September 1812)
- Valdinoto Infantry Regiment (6 February 1799 - 16 September 1812)
- Valdimazzara Light Infantry Battalion (6 February 1799 - 29 February 1808)
- Valdemone Light Infantry Battalion (6 February 1799 - 29 February 1808)
- Volunteer companies for the provision of the Islands
- Valdemone Cavalry Regiment (6 February 1799 – 16 September 1812)
- 2nd Battalion of the Regina Artillery Regiment
- Coastal artillerymen
- Fortress Garrison troops for the Coastal Towers
- Militia of the Kingdom
- Urban Militia of Palermo
- Urban Militia of Messina

Provincial regiments

- Urban Regiments of Naples (IX Infantry, I-IV Dragoons)
- Provincial Regiments of Terra di Lavoro (IV Infantry Nola, Aversa, Caserta, Sessa and San Germano; I-II Dragoons Aversa and Venafro)
- Provincial regiments of Salerno (I-IV infantry Salerno, Monte Corvino, Polla and Vallo: Nocera dragoons)
- Montefusco Provincial Regiments (I-III Infantry Avellino, Montella and Ariano: M.Marrino Dragoons)
- Provincial regiments of Matera (I-III infantry Matera, Venosa and Tursi: Matera dragoons)
- Provincial regiments of Lucera (I-IV Campobasso, Termoli, Lucera and Foggia infantry: Foggia dragoons)
- Provincial regiments of Trani (I-II Trani and Bari infantry: Molfetta dragoons)
- Provincial regiments of Lecce (I-II infantry Lecce and Manduria: dragoons Taranto)
- Provincial regiments of Cosenza (I-III infantry Cassano, Cosenza and Rossano; Cosenza dragoons)
- Provincial regiments of Catanzaro (I-IV infantry Catanzaro, Tropea, Reggio and Gerace; dragoons Gerace)
- Provincial regiments of Chieti (I-II infantry Chieti and Vasto: dragoons Vasto)
- Provincial Regiments of Teramo (Teramo Infantry and Dragoons)
- Provincial Regiments of L'Aquila (I - II Infantry L'Aquila and Celano, Dragoons L'Aquila)

=== Ordinance of 16 September 1812 (Lord Bentinck) ===
Trooper and Trumpeter of the 1st Sicilian Light Cavalry

- Royal Grenadiers Sicilian Guards Battalion (Note: ' During the reforms of 1812, the Royal Grenadiers were organized into two battalions, the first being the Battaglione Reali Guardie Siciliane... while the second battalion was named the Battaglione Reali Guardie Napoletane.')
- Royal Grenadiers Neapolitan Guards Battalion
- 1st Sicilian Regiment (formerly Valdimazzara)
- 2nd Sicilian Regiment (formerly Valdemone)
- 3rd Sicilian Regiment (formerly Valdinoto)
- 1st Foreign Regiment (formerly Royal Garrisons)
- 2nd Foreign Regiment (formerly Royal Samnites)
- 3rd Foreign Regiment (formerly Foreign)
- 4th Foreign Regiment (formerly 1st Coastal light infantry)
- 5th Foreign Regiment (formerly 2nd Coastal light infantry)
- Regimental flank companies, detached from above
- Calabrian Volunteer light infantry Battalion (August 4, 1814 - 1816)
- 1st Cavalry Regiment (formerly Prince)
- 2nd Cavalry Regiment (formerly Valdimazzara)
- 3rd Cavalry Regiment (formerly Valdinoto)
- Foot artillery brigades
- Horse Artillery Brigade
- Artillery train
- Company of Artificers and Pontoon Makers
- Field Engineer Brigade
- Garrison Regiment
- Fortress Garrison Companies of the Islands

=== 1830 ===
Trooper of a Reggimento Cacciatori of the Royal Guard

Royal Household

- Royal Bodyguard Company
- Royal Company of Halberdiers of Naples
- Royal Company of Halberdiers of Sicily

Royal Guard

- 2 Regiments of Royal Guard Grenadiers
- 2 Regiments of Royal Guard Light Cavalry
- Royal Guard Light Infantry Regiment
- Horse Artillery Demi Brigade
- Royal Guard Divisional Train

Royal Gendarmerie

- 8 Battalions of Gendarmerie on Foot
- 8 Squadrons of Horse Gendarmerie

Line troops

National Line Infantry

- 1st King's Regiment
- 2nd Regina Regiment
- 3rd Prince Regiment
- 4th Princess Regiment
- 5th Royal Bourbon Regiment
- 6th Royal Farnese Regiment
- 7th Royal Naples Regiment
- 8th Royal Palermo Regiment
- 9th Sicilian Regiment
- 6 Light Infantry Battalions

Swiss Division (each regiment was also equipped with an artillery section)

- 1st "de Schindler" Regiment
- 2nd Regiment "de Sury d'Aspermont"
- 3rd Regiment "de Stockalper de La Tour"
- 4th "de Wyttembach" Regiment

Line Cavalry

- King's Regiment
- Queen's Regiment
- Royal Ferdinand Lancers Regiment

Artillery and Train

Royal Corps of Artillery

- 2 Foot Artillery Regiments: "King" and "Queen"
- Firefighters and Armourers Brigade
- Veteran Artillery Brigade
- Political Military Artillery Corps
- Line Train Battalion

Royal Corps of Engineers

- Royal Topographic Office
- Sappers and Miners Battalion
- Pioneer Battalion

Military education institutions

- Royal Military College
- Military School

Sedentary troops

- Royal House of the Invalids
- Royal Veterans Regiment
- Territorial Commands
- Fortress Garrison Companies

== Sources ==
- Boeri, Giancarlo; Crociani, Piero; Brandani, Massimo (1997). L'Esercito Borbonico dal 1789 al 1815 (in Italian). Rome: Stato maggiore dell'esercito, Ufficio storico (USSME).
- Giglio, Vittorio (1948). Il Risorgimento nelle sue fasi di guerra. Vol. I. Milan: Vallardi.
- Ilari, Virgilio; Crociani, Piero; Boeri, Giancarlo (2008). Tomo II: 1806-1815. Le Due Sicilie nelle guerre napoleoniche (1800-1815) (in Italian). Rome: Ufficio storico dello SME. pp. 879–942. doi:10.13140/2.1.2548.9928 – via researchgate.net.
- Ilari, Virgilio; Crociari, Piero (12 October 2015). L'Armata a di Lord Bentinck 1812-1816 (eBook via kindle) (in Italian). Soldiershop. ISBN 978-8-89-915819-4.
- Pappas, Nicholas Charles (1981). "Balkan foreign legions in eighteenth-century Italy : The Reggimento Real Macedone and its successors". In Banac, Ivo; Ackerman, John G.; Szporluk, Roman (eds.). Nation and ideology essays in honor of Wayne S. Vucinich. New York: Columbia University Press. pp. 35–59. ISBN 978-0-91-471089-9 – via promacedonia.org.
- Pappas, Nicholas Charles (1991). Greeks in Russian Military Service in the Late 18th and Early 19th Centuries. Thessaloniki: Institute for Balkan Studies.
- Pieri, Pier (1962). Storia militare del Risorgimento. Turin: Einaudi.
- Scardigli, Marco (2011). Le grandi battaglie del Risorgimento. Milan: Rizzoli. ISBN 978-88-17-04611-4.
- Scirocco, Alfredo (1996). "FERDINANDO II di Borbone, re delle Due Sicilie". Dizionario Biografico degli Italiani, Vol. XLVI. Roma: Istituto della Enciclopedia Italiana.
- Tranié, Jean; Carmigniani, Juan Carlos (1982). Napoleon's War in Spain: The French Peninsular Campaigns, 1807–1814. Translated by Mallender, Janet S.; Clements, John R. based on the notes and documents of the late Commandant Henry Lachouque (1883–1971). Arms and Armour Press. ISBN 978-1-85-409219-9.
- "Reali Guardie del Corpo (Sicily)". Army (of the States) of the Two Sicilies. Weltseele - A Napoleonic Wars Project (1804 - 1815). 16 January 2025.
- "Reggimento Granatieri della Guardia Reale (Sicily)". Army (of the States) of the Two Sicilies. Weltseele - A Napoleonic Wars Project (1804 - 1815). 18 November 2024.
- Napoleonic Wargaming and the army of the Kingdom of the Two Sicilies
- The "Foreign troops" in the Neapolitan Army (in Italian)
