= Alessandro Nunziante =

Italian general and politician (1815–1881)

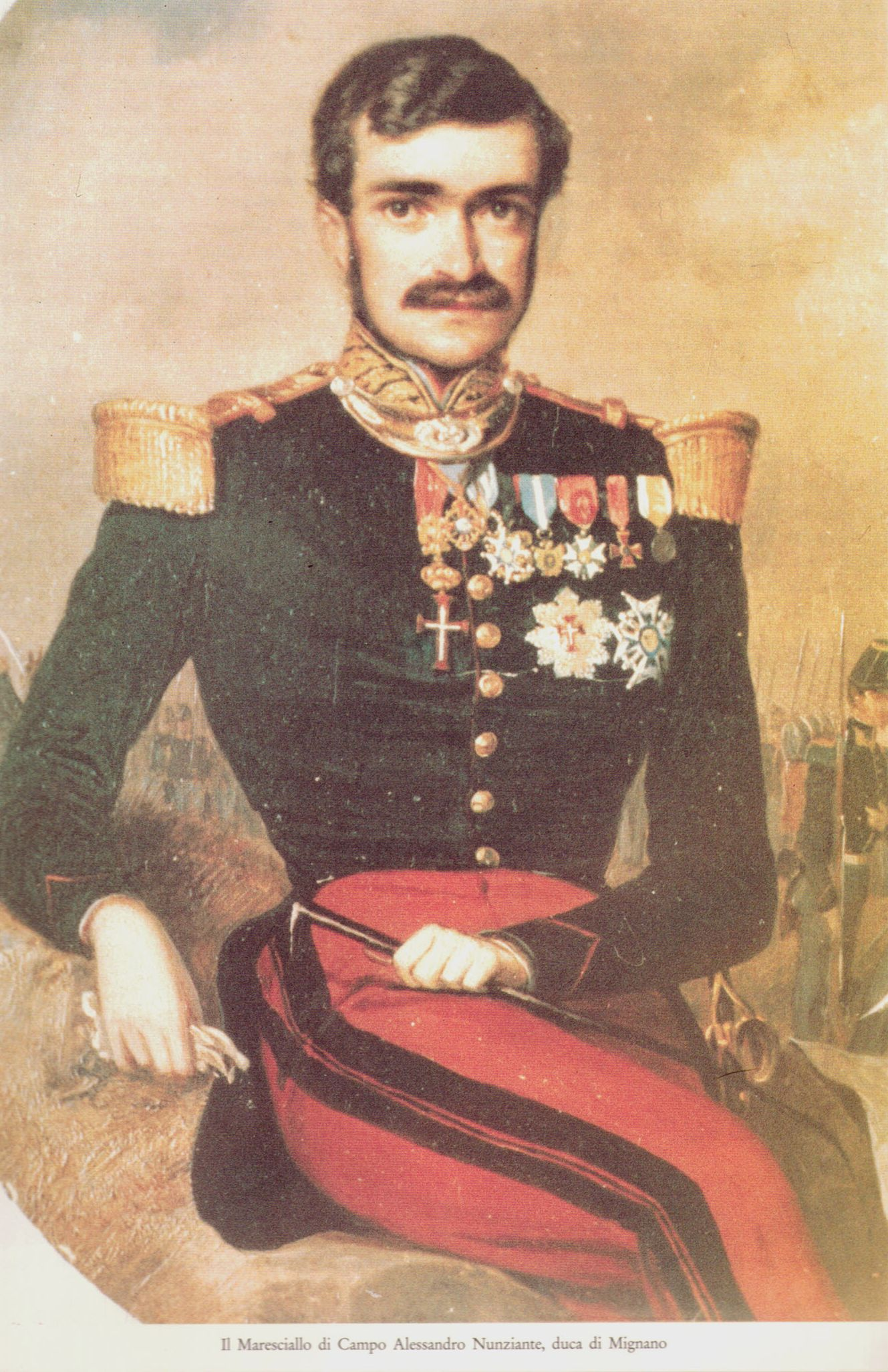
- Nunziante in the Army of the Two Sicilies
- Born: 30 July 1815; Messina, Kingdom of Sicily
- Died: 6 March 1881 (aged 65); Naples, Kingdom of Italy
- Spouse: Teresa Tuttavilla (m. 1839)
- Military career
- Allegiance: Two Sicilies; Kingdom of Italy
- Rank: General
- Wars: First Italian War of Independence; Third Italian War of Independence

Senate of the Kingdom of Italy
- In office 16 March 1879 – 6 March 1881

Chamber of Deputies of the Kingdom of Italy
- In office 26 May 1870 – 5 November 1876

Personal details
- Party: Historical Left

Alessandro Nunziante, Duke of Mignano (30 July 1815 – 6 March 1881), was an Italian general and politician of the Kingdom of the Two Sicilies, and, from 1861, the Kingdom of Italy.

While an officer in the Bourbon Army, Nunziante was a reactionary. Although he was a friend of Ferdinand II and close collaborator with Francis II, he left the Bourbon court in 1860, resigning and returning his honors, and joined the Italian unification effort.

== Early life ==
Alessandro Nunziante was born in Messina, the son of General Vito Nunziante and Camilla Barrese. In 1827, Nunziante entered the Nunziatella Military School. After completing his studies, he began his career in the 7th Regiment of the Bourbon Army.

In 1839, Nunziante married Teresa Tuttavilla of the Dukes of Mignano, daughter of the Duke of Calabritto. They had 5 children: Francesco (died in infancy), Mariano, Maria Elena, Maria Camilla (died in infancy), and Pasquale (died in infancy).

In 1845, Ferdinand II granted Nunziante's wife the title of Duchess of Mignano and made the title transmissible to her husband.

== Military career ==
=== 1848–1860: Army of the Two Sicilies ===
In 1844, Nunziante joined the army general staff under Ferdinand II of the Two Sicilies. In 1846, he was promoted to major, and in 1848, he was promoted to lieutenant colonel. On 18 May 1848, a series of anti-Bourbon riots broke out in Naples. In an effort to quell the riots, the king's Swiss Guards and Nunziante's royal guards invaded the rebel headquarters at Palazzo Orsini di Gravina, killing all the rebels and effectively putting down the revolt. Nunziante delivered the news of this victory to King Ferdinand II himself, and was awarded the title of Commander of the Order of Saint George of the Reunion on 27 May 1848.

The following year, in 1849, Sicily also revolted against the Bourbons, and Nunziante participated in the expedition commanded by Carlo Filangieri to reconquer the island. With the Bourbon Army at the gates of Palermo, the rebels made a request for amnesty in exchange for their surrender. Nunziante informed Filangieri that Ferdinand II left him to specify the extent of the amnesty. Having clarified that those guilty of common crimes would be amnestied, Filangieri and his troops returned peacefully to Palermo on 15 May 1849.

In 1850, Nunziante was promoted to colonel. That year, he was awarded the title of Knight of the Order of Saint Ferdinand and of Merit by Ferdinand II, and Knight of the Legion of Honour by France. In 1855, he was promoted to brigadier general, and in 1856, he was awarded the title of Commander of the Order of Leopold by Austria.

On 22 May 1959, Ferdinand II died and his son Francis II succeeded him as King of the Two Sicilies. Soon after, Francis II appointed Nunziante as his adjutant general, thus greatly increasing Nunziante's influence at court. Nunziante's esteem increased further when, on 7 July, he helped quash a mutiny of some Swiss units of the Bourbon Army.

==== 1860: Garibaldi's Expedition of the Thousand ====
When Giuseppe Garibaldi landed in Marsala on 11 May 1860, Francis II appointed Ferdinando Lanza as commander of the Bourbon troops in Sicily. Nunziante, who had prepared a defense plan for the island and was hoping for the position, was reportedly disappointed.

The Garibaldines, with victories at Calatafimi and Palermo, had taken major strongholds in Sicily by May 1860. Nunziante convinced Francis II to prepare a 25,000-soldier mission to reconquer the island. However, Francis II's reinstatement of the Statuto Albertino on 25 June changed kingdom policy, and Antonio Spinelli di Scalea's government rejected the mission.

On 14 July 1860, Francis II appointed Giuseppe Salvatore Pianell as Minister of War over Nunziante. Pianell was also given the task of convincing Filangieri to resume leadership of the state, which he had refused. Nunziante, embittered by the king's choices, began to make contact with major players of the opposition.

==== 1860: Resignation from the Bourbon Army ====
On 2 July 1860, Nunziante resigned from the Bourbon Army, declaring that he could "no longer wear on his chest the decorations of a government who confuses honest, upright, and loyal men with those that only deserve contempt". Nunziante subsequently joined the Italian cause and issued an order to the cacciatori under his command: "Prove yourselves, in the new opportunities that may be offered, soldiers of the glorious Italian homeland of which God has made us all children".

Nunziante left Naples for Turin where he offered his collaboration to Cavour, Prime Minister of Piedmont–Sardinia. Cavour assigned Nunziante the task of inciting a liberal revolution in Naples in favor of Victor Emmanuel II. On 16 August 1860, Nunziante returned to Naples incognito, having made contact with Admiral Carlo Pellion di Persano of the Royal Sardinian Navy and Ambassador Salvatore Pes.

Nunziante, according to a letter to Cavour on 28 August, proposed demonstrations in favor of Victor Emmanuel II (rather than Garibaldi) to motivate the Bourbon troops to join the Italian cause. However, the Mazzinian committee had spread the rumor that Nunziante had been corrupted by the Savoys and that he would've betrayed the soldiers who joined him. Nunziante was not discouraged by this. He intended to convince the Bourbon troops who remained in Naples to simply refuse to fight, as he considered inciting troops to desert dishonorable. Ultimately, despite the rallies and demonstrations in favor of Victor Emmanuel II, the anti-Garibaldine revolt never took place.

=== 1861–1868: Kingdom of Italy ===
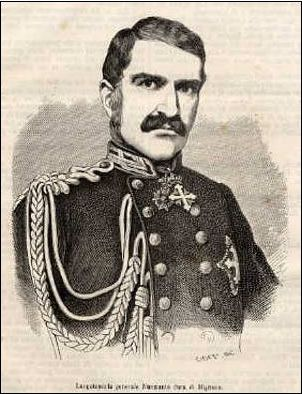
Nunziante in 1867

Nunziante was granted entry into the Royal Sardinian Army on 17 November 1860 as a lieutenant general.

The Kingdom of Italy was established on 17 March 1861. Nunziante was awarded the title of Commander of the Order of Saints Maurice and Lazarus—which had become a de facto Italian state order for military and civilian merits—on 4 August 1861. He was later promoted to Grand Officer of the Order on 30 March 1862.

In 1864, Nunziante joined the commissione permanente for the general defense of the Italian state, and, when the Third Italian War of Independence broke out in 1866, he was appointed to command the 4th Division of the II Army Corps under General Domenico Cucchiari. He participated in the Battle of Custoza and the subsequent siege of the Austrian bridgehead of Borgoforte.

On 6 December 1866, Nunziante was awarded the title of Grand Officer of the Military Order of Savoy. In 1868, he was awarded the title of Grand Officer of the Order of the Crown of Italy and was appointed chairman of the Infantry Weapon Committee.

== Political career and death ==
On 26 May 1870, Nunziante was elected to Legislature X of the Chamber of Deputies with the Historical Left. He was re-elected up to Legislature XIII in 1876, but resigned in 1879 upon being appointed to the Senate of the Republic by Umberto I.

On 6 March 1881, Nunziante died in Naples at the age of 65.

== Awards ==
- 1845: Knight of the Order of Saint Vladimir
- 1848: Commander of the Order of Saint George of the Reunion
- 1849: Commander of the Order of Charles III
- 1850: Knight of the Order of Saint Ferdinand and of Merit
- 1850: Knight of the Order of the Legion of Honour
- 1856: Commander of the Order of Leopold
- 1858: Grand Officer of the Order of Saint George of the Reunion
- 1861: Commander of the Order of Saints Maurice and Lazarus
- 1862: Grand Officer of the Order of Saints Maurice and Lazarus
- 1866: Grand Officer of the Military Order of Savoy
- 1868: Grand Cordon of the Order of Saints Maurice and Lazarus
- 1868: Grand Officer of the Order of the Crown of Italy
- 1877: Grand Cordon of the Order of the Crown of Italy
