= Inno al Re =

National anthem of the Kingdom of the Two Sicilies

English: Hymn to the King
- National anthem of Kingdom of the Two Sicilies
- Music: disputed between Giovanni Paisiello and Pietro Pisani, 1787 or 1797
- Adopted: 1815–1861

Audio sample
- Inno al Re: file; help

"Inno al Re" (English: "Hymn to the King"), disputed between Giovanni Paisiello and Pietro Pisani, was a hymn praising King Ferdinand IV of Naples, then Ferdinand I of Two Sicilies, which functioned as the national anthem of the kingdom of the Two Sicilies.

== Lyrics ==
The text usually associated with the Inno al Re is from a score written between 1835 and 1840 for Princess Eleonora Galletti di Palazzolo.

The name of Ferdinand could be replaced by whichever Bourbon king was ruling the Two Sicilies at the time. The "double throne of his fathers" suggest the text was written while Naples and the Sicily were still two separated kingdoms, before 1816.

Italian lyrics Iddio conservi il Re per lunga e lunga età come nel cor ci sta viva Fernando il Re! Iddio lo serbi al duplice trono dei Padri suoi Iddio lo serbi a noi! viva Fernando il Re!	English translation God save the king for a long, long time as he is in our hearts long live Ferdinand, the king! God save him to the double throne of his fathers God save him to us! long live Ferdinand, the king!

== Modern interpretations ==
A new set of lyrics has been written by Neapolitan songwriter Riccardo Pazzaglia to go along with the original composition. This variation of the anthem is known as Ritornati dal passato (Back from the Past). On September 7th 1993, it has been officially adopted as the anthem of the "Movimento Neoborbonico", a Two Sicilies independence movement.

These are the lyrics by Riccardo Pazzaglia:

Italian lyrics Dio ti salvi, cara patria che ti distendi in questo antico mare d'eroi, millenaria culla del pensiero che nacque in Grecia e in questa terra rifiorí. Cancellata dalla Storia, le tue bandiere vengono rialzate da noi. Sulle sacre torri di Gaeta scriviamo ancora la parola: Dignità. Soldato del Volturno che cadesti qui, nessuno per cent'anni il nome tuo scolpí. Dai figli che visti non hai l'onore tu riavrai. Ritornati dal passato, chi in noi crederà stavolta vincerà. Va avanti, tamburino, suona come allor: assente la fortuna non mancò il valor. Il Fato che un dí ci tradí adesso ci riuní. Ritornati dal passato, chi in noi crederà stavolta vincerà.	English translation Let God save you, dear homeland that stretches out in this ancient sea of heroes, cradle of thought that, born in Greece, in this land flourished anew. Erased from history, we are once again flying your flags. On the sacred towers of Gaeta we write again the word: Dignity. Soldier of the Volturno, you that fell here, no one for a hundred years has engraved your name. The children you never knew will return honour to you. Back from the past, those who believe in us this time will win. Go ahead, drummer, beat like you once did: without luck but not without courage. Fate that betrayed us now reunites us. Back from the past those who believe in us this time will win.
