= Giosuè Ritucci =

Italian politician (1794–1869)

Minister of War, Kingdom of Two Sicilies
- In office Early 1860 – May, 1860
- Preceded by: Vacant
- Succeeded by: Giuseppe Salvatore Pianell

Commander of the Military of the Kingdom of the Two Sicilies, in Calabria
- In office 1850s – Early 1860
- Preceded by: Unknown
- Succeeded by: Vacant – Position abolished

Personal details
- Born: 1794 Naples
- Died: 1869 (aged 74–75) Naples

Giosuè Ritucci Lambertini di Santanastasia (1794, Naples–1869, Naples) was a military commander and minister of war in the Kingdom of the Two Sicilies.

He fought in the Napoleonic Wars. He enlisted in the army in 1807, and was promoted to second lieutenant in 1811.

In 1848 he was injured in the leg during the revolt of Palermo.

In 1860 he led the kingdom's army at the Battle of the Volturno and fought at the Siege of Gaeta.

== Sources ==
- biography (Italian)
