= Liborio Romano =

Italian politician (1793–1867)

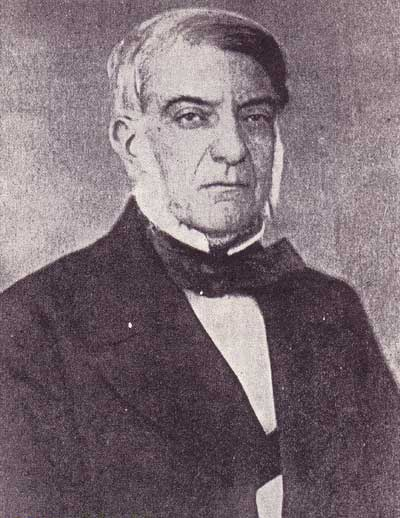
Liborio Romano

Liborio Romano (27 October 1793 – 17 July 1867) was an Italian politician.

== Biography ==
Liborio Romano was born in Patù in Apulia, then part of the Kingdom of Naples. He studied at Lecce and graduated in law at Naples, soon beginning to teach in the same university.

Frequenting the Carbonari, Romano adhered to the Risorgimento ideals. In 1820 he took part to the riots against the Neapolitan government, being imprisoned and exiled. In 1848 he returned to Naples and was instrumental in the events leading King Ferdinand II to issue a Constitution. On 15 May 1848 Romano was again arrested and condemned to death, but managed to turn it into exile, moving to Montpellier in France.

Romano returned in 1854. Six years later, with Giuseppe Garibaldi's Expedition of the Thousand ongoing, he was appointed Prefect of Police by King Francis II. While Garibaldi's victories were nearing the end of the Kingdom, on 14 July 1860 he was named Minister of the Interior and Police: Romano, realising the inevitability of the end, began secret contacts with Count Cavour, the Piedmontese Prime Minister, and Garibaldi, preparing the switching of southern Italy into Savoy's hands. He suggested to King Francis that he move to the fortress of Gaeta, in order to avoid riots, destruction and useless suffering to the Neapolitan population. When Garibaldi entered Naples, Romano was confirmed as Minister of the Interiors.

In January 1861 the first general elections of the newborn Kingdom of Italy were held, and Romano was elected to the Italian Chamber of Deputies, where he remained until 1865.

He died in his native Patù.
