= Vito Nunziante =

Italian general, politician and entrepreneur (1775–1836)

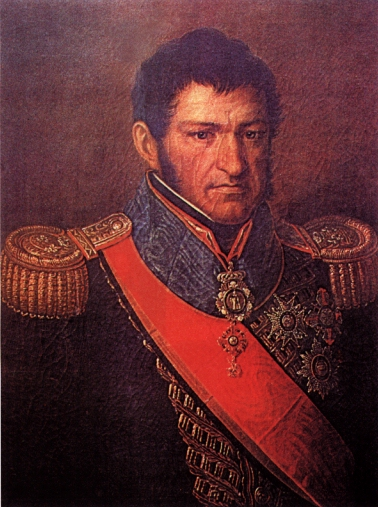
Vito Nunziante

Vito Nicola Nunziante (12 April 1775 – 22 September 1836) was an Italian general, politician and entrepreneur, who was active in the Kingdom of Naples (later the Kingdom of the Two Sicilies).

== Early life ==
Vito Nunziante was born in Campagna, in the province of Salerno, on 12 April 1775 to a modest family, the fourth child of eleven siblings. He was entrusted by his father Pasquale to a canonical uncle to be initiated to the priesthood, but in 1794 he was called, through dell'imbossolamento method (pretty much a draw), to perform military service, activities for which he probably felt more inclined. Its exceptional stature, an extraordinarily strong body and his courage made him a soldier of election and earned him the esteem of Luigi Pignatelli colonel who commanded the 13th Infantry Regiment of the Line "Lucania" to which he was assigned. It was the same Pignatelli to appoint him quartermaster of the regiment and to obtain later, thanks to the fact that, had the task of capturing the defectors will shoot about two thousand in two years, for the young recruit the shoulder straps of the official with the rank of ensign in 1797.

== Career ==
=== Participation in the wars against the French ===
War broke out between the Kingdom of Naples and the French Republic, Nunziante participated in the first occupation of Rome by the Neapolitans. Following the escape of Ferdinand I to Sicily, on 22 December 1798, and the Neapolitan army victory, he managed to form a regiment which he called "Holy Cross", by which he joined all armed sanfedista of Cardinal Ruffo. The latter renamed the regiment as "Montefusco" and promoted him to the rank of colonel commandant. During the reconquest of the kingdom he participated in the siege of the fortress of Capua until the surrender of the French and then the second occupation of Rome.

He was captured during the battle of Siena, but he managed to escape. It was subsequently confirmed by the king in the rank of colonel and put in charge of the regiment "Sanniti". In 1806, after the defeat in the battle of Campotenese and the consequent French reconquest of the kingdom of Naples, is brought in Sicily where he was charged with his regiment and a small reinforcement of cavalry to keep Reggio, only foothold on the continent still holding to Bourbon. Joint operations in the area with orders to keep with the ships that had transported, so that they can ensure a rapid retreat, after evaluating the situation, successfully asked the king to send back to the ships. Also he advised the king to disperse the masses of common people or to integrate them into the army.

In 1807 he was put under the command of Prince Louis of Hesse-Philippsthal on an expedition for the reconquest of the mainland. On 28 May 1807 he and his expedition of the French troops were defeated in the battle of Mileto (near Seminara), despite his counseling with Philippsthal who proposed a retreat towards Catanzaro, which was considered to be the best strategic location. Back in Reggio (with the remains of his regiment reduced from 1,200 to 579 men, including 49 hospitals) Nunziante assured the defense of the castle for another six months, after which he was recalled in Sicily where he was promoted to Brigadier and put in charge of the Milazzo forces.

In his new role, he managed to reorganize the forces under his command, improving conditions for soldiers and relations with allies British and obtained, unlike the provisions of applicable regulations, to have this in case its degree was greater than that of the English officer present in the same place. In the same period, he was a widower by his first wife Faustina Onesti and met in Lipari Camilla Baresse, " graceful and rich maiden", which became his second wife. Since the latter had eight children, who were added to the four first bed. The various offers came to pass the service to Murat, who always opposed a firm denial, though his children they were still on the mainland and Murat do not allow the transfer. In 1814, under the command of Lord William Bentinck he took part in the conquest of Genoa, but was later excluded as was proclaimed in an article contrary to the agreement between Murat and the Powers, which did not provide for the return of the continental part of the Kingdom of Bourbon.

=== As a general ===
In August 1815, after the restoration of the Bourbon and the exile of Murat, he was appointed commander of the 5th territorial division (which by that time had whole Calabria and expertise of that area), and moved its headquarters from Monteleone to Tropea. On October 9, he heard the news of the landing of Gioacchino Murat's troops in an attempt to regain power and its subsequent capture. Following these events, it was commissioned by the government to appoint the military court which was to judge the former king and later sentenced him to death. On 12 April 1816 he obtained the title of Marquess of Cirello; and later (20 July 1819) the degree of lieutenant general; his appointment as Knight Grand Cross of the Order of St. George; the post of civil commissioner and the power of alter ego, who equated her orders to those of the sovereign.

In this age it took care to suppress the Carbonari in Calabria succeeding admirably and worked actively against the banditry; He was also able to make open a road between Monteleone and Reggio Calabria. On 4 July 1820 he was appointed by letter of the king as commander of 4th territorial division, which included Salerno and Basilicata, and remained at this position at which he tried to oppose erupted motions for the granting of the constitution. Schieratosi later in favor of the constitution with a letter published in the Journal Constitution of the Kingdom of the Two Sicilies was then appointed on 17 November 1820 the commander of the territorial division of Syracuse and then on 9 December of the same year as General Commander of the Sicilian Army. Also the same year, he was initiated into masonry with his son, without formalities, in the Loggia "Damon and Pythian" of Syracuse. During the restoration he was involved by General Carrascosa, exiled, in a controversy over the failure to repression of the uprisings.

In early April 1821 he was called to be part of the temporary Government Council and from 30 July 1822 took charge of the army's reorganization with the office of inspector general of infantry and cavalry of the line. When King Francis I ascended to the throne in 1825, he was appointed Knight of the Royal Order of St. George and the General Commander of the Army of the Two Sicilies. Additionally, he was also given additional staff and as a bonus, 460 ducats monthly, all of which was paid by Ferdinand himself. When Ferdinand II came to the throne in 1830, Nunziante was appointed Lieutenant (governor) of Sicily, awaiting Leopold of Bourbon to assume the role. In this short period he managed to win the affection and respect of the various components of the people. Later he obtained the dignity of a minister and the first since the King of the whole army, which earned him the assumption of the supreme command of the Continental Army.

== Death ==
He later took an interest in business and philanthropy while residing in San Ferdinando. Upon staying there, he caught malaria and was transferred to Naples where he in his will appointed Florestano Pepe. That was his last order. He died of malaria and liver complications in 1836 at Torre Annunziata. His body was transferred back to San Ferdinando immediately after funeral ceremony in Naples, where the body now rests.

== Honours ==
- Order of Saint Januarius
- Order of Saint Ferdinand and of Merit
