= Battle of the Volturno =

1860 battle of the Expedition of the Thousand

Coordinates: 41°5′31″N 14°5′40″E

- Part of the Expedition of the Thousand
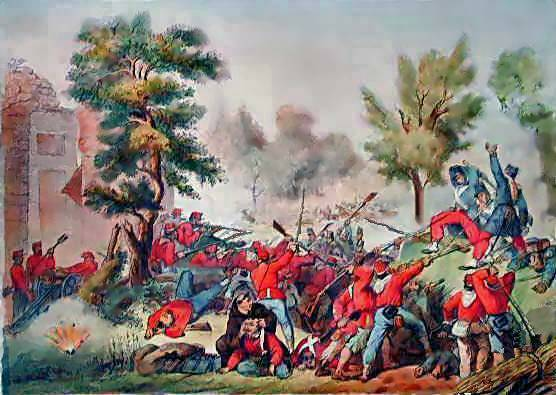
- Scene from the battle
Date	1 October 1860
Location	Volturno River, northern Campania
Result	Garibaldine victory

Belligerents
(Italy) Redshirts	Two Sicilies

Commanders and leaders
Giuseppe Garibaldi	Giosuè Ritucci

Strength
20,000 (Note: "... one half of which were Calabrese recruits, the other half Northern Italians and Sicilians, with a few French and Hungarians." {G. R. Mundy p.251})	28,000

Casualties and losses
306 killed 1,327 wounded 389 missing Total: 2,022 men	260 killed 731 wounded 2,253 captured Total: 3,244 men

The Battle of the Volturno refers to a series of military clashes between Giuseppe Garibaldi's volunteers and the troops of the Kingdom of Two Sicilies occurring around the River Volturno, between the cities of Capua, Santa Maria Capua Vetere and Caserta in northern Campania, in September and October 1860. The main battle took place on 1 October 1860 between 30,000 Garibaldines (mostly defected Sicilians, including from Calabria) and 25,000 Bourbon troops (Neapolitans).

== Background ==
Garibaldi's Expedition of the Thousand had conquered Sicily and much of southern Italy with a startling speed, entering Naples on the 7 September while King Francis II of the Two Sicilies took refuge in the strong fortress of Gaeta, midway between Rome and Naples. In the meantime the Neapolitan army was rebuilt in Capua under Marshal Giosuè Ritucci, the first skirmishes with Garibaldi's volunteers occurring on the 26 and 29 September.

On 30 September a Neapolitan corps crossed the River Volturno at Triflisco, marching towards Santa Maria a Vologno, but was halted by two Garibaldine brigades. The following day Ritucci then decided on a frontal attack with two divisions against Garibaldi's centre, which occupied a line running from Sant'Angelo in Formis and Santa Maria a Vico. After defeating the enemy, Ritucci was to reach Caserta and then Naples itself.

Garibaldi wanted to cross the Volturno, keeping the Neapolitan Army against Capua, while he prevented King Francis II from reaching Gaeta. However, the Neapolitan Army attempted a double-envelopment of Garibaldi between their Capua forces, and those of Mechel and Ruia at Dugenta.

== Battle ==
On 1 October, before 6 am, Neapolitan General Anfan de Rivera attacked Giacomo Medici at Sant'Angelo, Tabacchi and Ruggeri attacked Milbiz at Santa Maria, and Mechel advanced upon Nino Bixio at Maddaloni. Garibaldi sent reinforcements to Milbiz and Medici. At 2 pm, Medici and Milbiz counterattacked, forcing the Neapolitans towards Capua. Later in the afternoon, Mechel also withdrew.

== Consequences ==
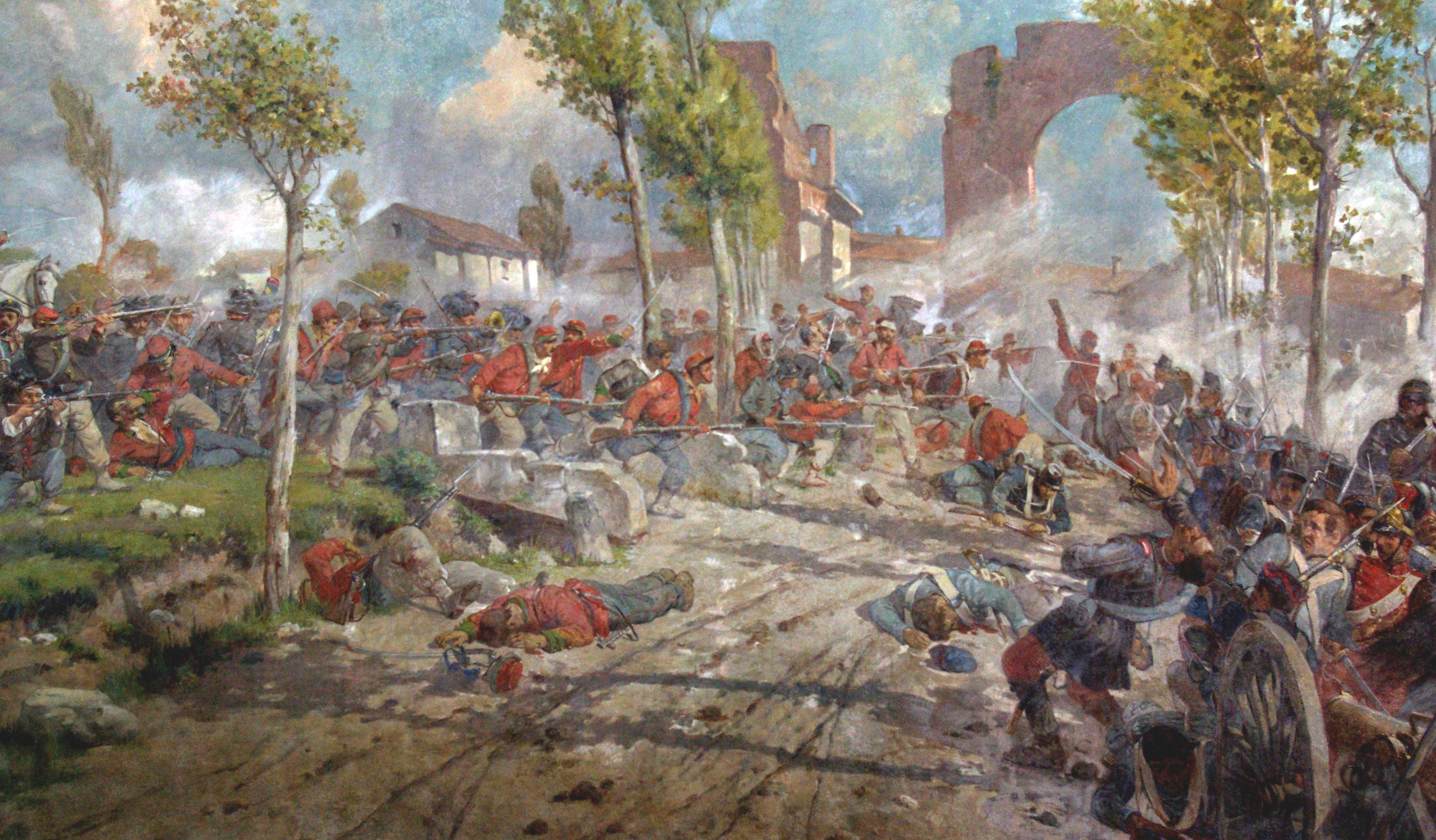
A scene from the battle in Santa Maria Capua Vetere

According to Schneid, "Garibaldi narrowly won the Battle of Volturno. The Southern Army placed Capua under siege, and the Piedmontese forces marched on Gaeta where the erstwhile Neapolitan king had taken refuge."

The cost for Garibaldi in men was higher: 306 killed and 1,327 wounded, but the Neapolitan forces had lost almost 1,000 in killed and wounded themselves and over 2,000 taken prisoner. The Bourbon army was unable to use its victory to capture Caserta. Both armies showed bravery, except perhaps for the Royal Guards and troops of Ruiz de Ballesteros, who were the largest cause of the defeat.

Garibaldi was forced to request troops from the Royal Sardinian Army. Yet while Francis II wished to use the impasse for the Garibaldi forces, to attack again, his generals recommended that the troops be reorganised. Thus he left Capua for Gaeta, and was unable to retake his throne. Soon Piedmontese reinforcements arrived, defeating the royal troops at Gaeta, and causing the King to depart after a long siege.

== See also ==
- Risorgimento
- Siege of Gaeta (1860)
