= The Piedmontese campaign in central Italy, 1860 =

Piedmontese campaign in central Italy
- Part of the Unification of Italy
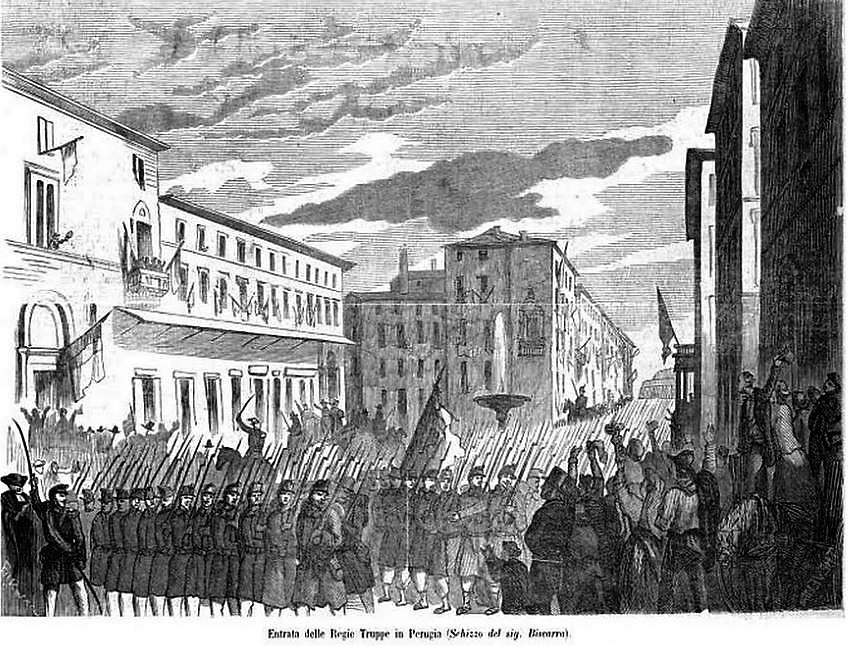
- Entry of Piedmontese troops into Perugia 1860
Date	September - October 1860
Location	central Italy and southern Italy
Result	Piedmontese victory
Territorial changes	Kingdom of Sardinia (Piedmont) annexes Umbria and Marche from the Papal States as well as all of the Kingdom of the Two Sicilies; proclamation of the Kingdom of Italy

Belligerents
Kingdom of Sardinia	Papal States	Kingdom of the Two Sicilies

Commanders and leaders
Victor Emmanuel II; Enrico Cialdini; Manfredo Fanti it:Maurizio Gerbaix de Sonnaz; Raffaele Cadorna; Carlo Pellion di Persano	Christophe Lamoricière; Georges de Pimodan †	Francis II of the Two Sicilies it:Luigi Scotti Douglas it:Giovanni Salzano de Luna; Giosuè Ritucci

The Piedmontese campaign in central Italy took place between September and October 1860 during the unification of Italy. It followed the Second Italian War of Independence and the Expedition of the Thousand. The campaign saw a military contingent from the Kingdom of Sardinia (Piedmont) sent against the Papal States. Later, the operation was extended to the Kingdom of the Two Sicilies, officially to restore order and prevent Garibaldi's army from proclaiming an independent republic and moving against the Pope.

== The invasion of the Papal States ==
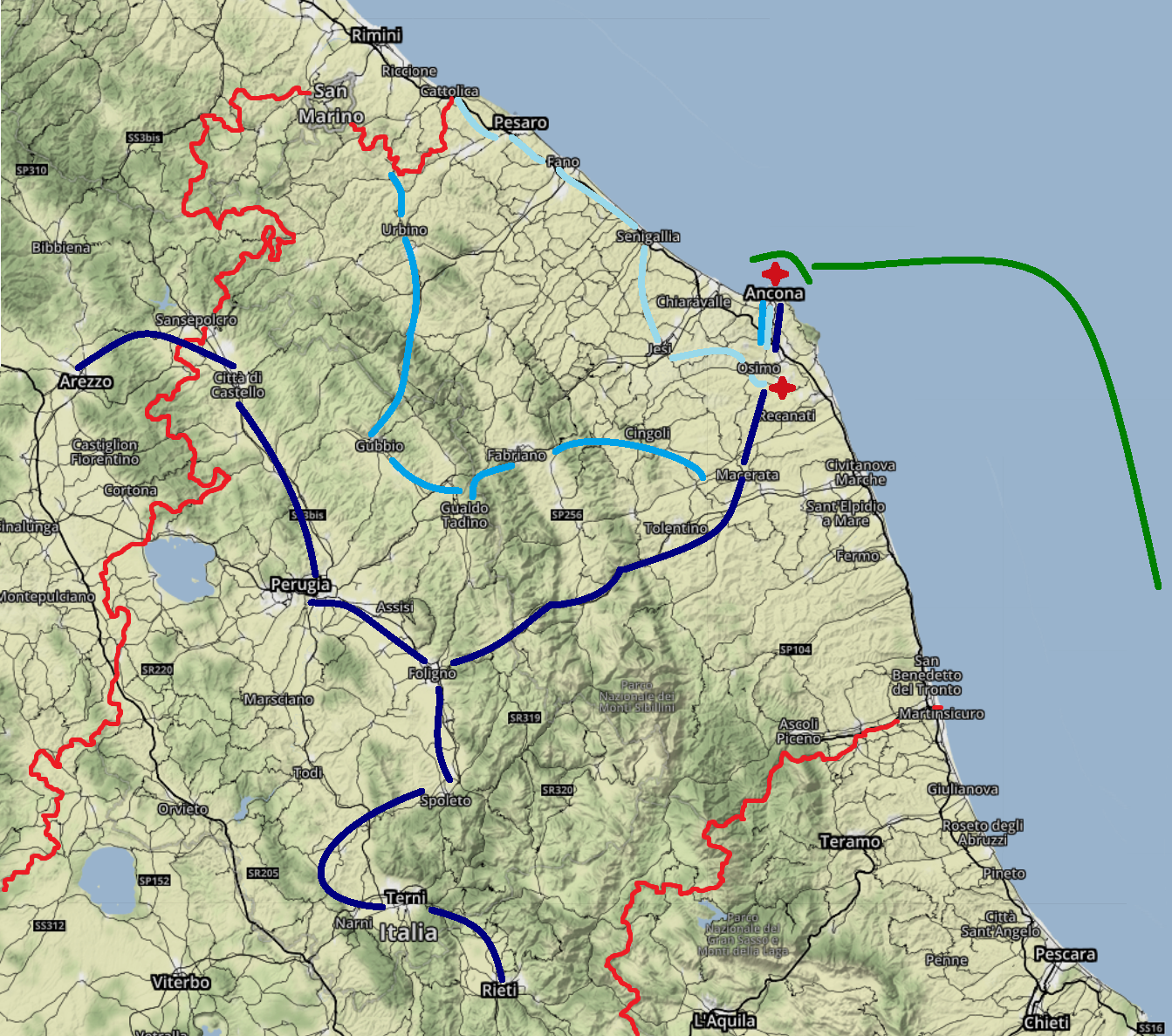
First phase of the campaign

In the first phase of the campaign the Piedmontese army, composed of the IV and the V Army Corps under General Manfredo Fanti, moved towards the papal provinces of Umbria and the Marche. The casus belli was the need for Piedmont to intervene against the papal army’s repression of the revolutionary movements that favoured the unification of Italy. These had broken out in the first days of September in conjunction with Garibaldi's entry into Naples. The papal forces also included foreign volunteers and mercenaries, commanded by generals from beyond the Alps, and these facts were also used as a justification for the campaign. The Piedmontese plan was for a pincer movement: its armies were to move forward in either side of the Apennines, interrupting the communication routes between Lazio, Umbria and Marche, and then converge on Ancona, the final objective of the expedition.

On 11 September 1860 the Piedmontese army crossed the borders of the Papal State at three different points: the V Army Corps, commanded by Fanti himself, passed through Arezzo and Sansepolcro and took Perugia on 14 September before headed towards Foligno. The IV Army Corps invaded the Marche from two points: the 13th Division, under the command of Raffaele Cadorna, followed a route close to the Apennines through Urbino, Cagli and Gubbio, while the rest of the contingent, composed of the 4th and 7th Divisions under Enrico Cialdini proceeded along the coast by way of Pesaro, Fano and Senigallia, clashing with the Papal Army of General de Lamoricière at the battle of Castelfidardo on 18 September.

Having taken control of the Via Flaminia and Via Salaria, the Piedmontese took the main cities of Umbria and the Marche and routed the papal contingent that was trying to gather near Macerata. They then besieged Ancona, taking it on 29 September, thanks to a successful naval blockade.

== The invasion of the Kingdom of the Two Sicilies ==
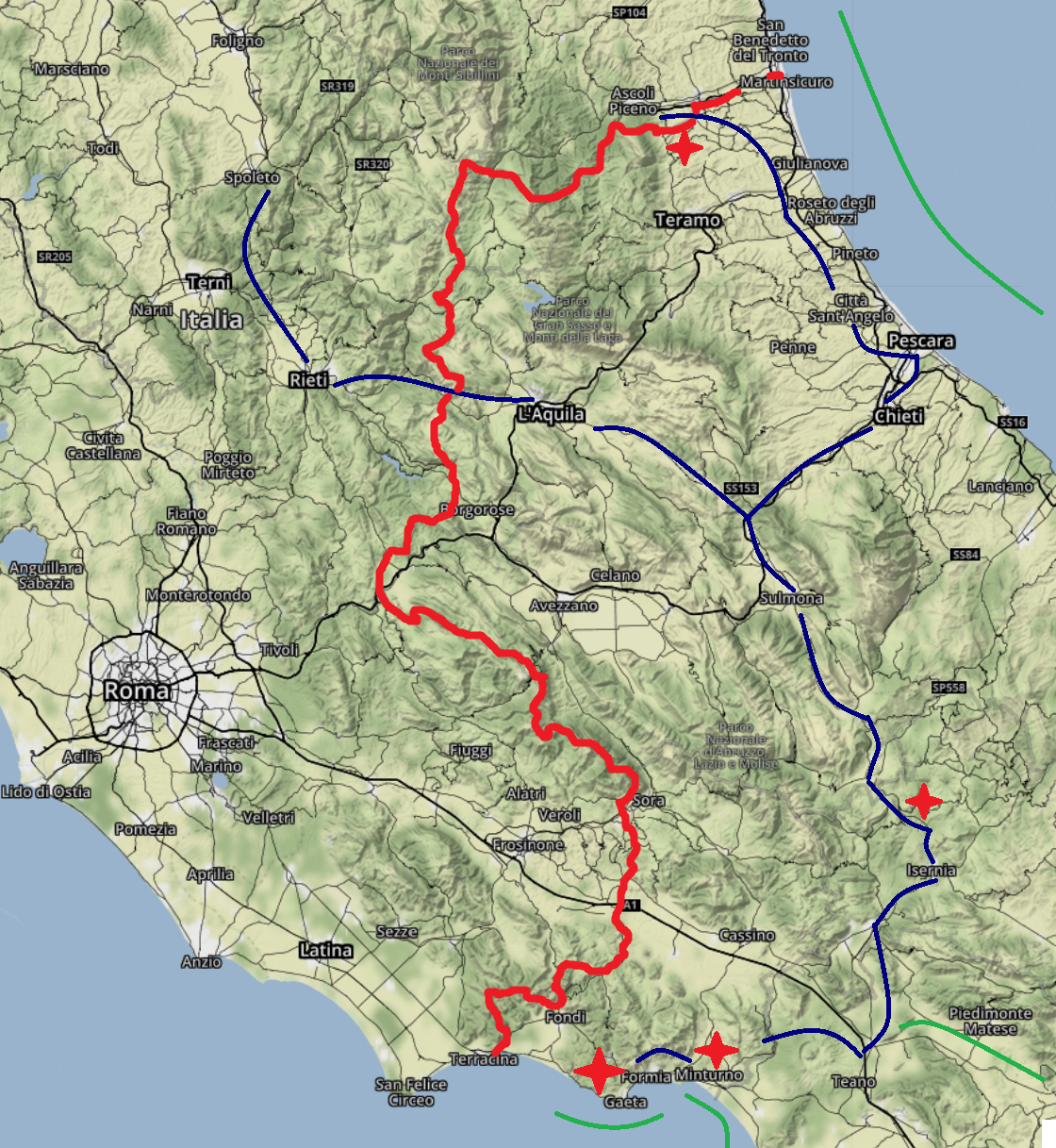
Second phase of the campaign

The second phase began with the Piedmontese invasion of the Kingdom of the Two Sicilies. The rationale was both to restore order following the effective collapse of the government of Francis II and to prevent Garibaldi from completing the conquest of the kingdom after the Battle of the Volturno, and then attacking Rome.

=== On the march south ===
Arriving in Ancona on 3 October, King Victor Emmanuel took command of the army and marched south at the head of his troops, aiming to reach the Volturno plain, where the Bourbon army, entrenched between the strongholds of Gaeta and Capua, was defending itself from Garibaldi's men. While a contingent moved along the coast by ship, the bulk of the army set out along two different routes; as they advanced, insurrections and mutinies broke out in various cities and fortresses not yet occupied by Garibaldi's men, and groups of volunteers began to gather.

On 12 October Victor Emmanuel crossed the Tronto River with his troops. At the same time, part of the army moved towards Spoleto and Rieti with the intention of reaching L'Aquila. After bypassing the fortress of Civitella del Tronto, which was subsequently placed under siege, the king continued along the coast to the mouth of the Aterno and finally headed towards Chieti. Once in Popoli, the two contingents reunited and together headed towards Roccaraso and Castel di Sangro, in the direction of the Macerone pass where the road from Abruzzo passed that allowed access to the Terra di Lavoro. Here the Piedmontese were joined by the troops who had departed from Ancona and, having landed in Manfredonia, had moved along a route that had taken them to Foggia, Ariano and Benevento.

The main military events of this phase were the siege of the fortress of Civitella, which began on 26 October and lasted several months, and the battle of Macerone (20 October) which, although considered a simple skirmish due to the small forces on the field, opened the way for the Piedmontese, allowing them to take the Bourbon army from behind.

=== On the battlefield ===
The Piedmontese objective was to join up with Garibaldi's southern army against the army of the Two Sicilies in the northern portion of the Terra di Lavoro. King Francis II had retreated to the fortress of Gaeta, maintaining control of an area that was protected by a series of defensive lines, the most important of which ran along the northern bank of the Volturno River, from the coast to the fortified city of Capua.

Having failed in the Battle of the Volturno to repel Garibaldi's men, Francis II's army was forced to retreat further by the intervention of the Piedmontese army, which had reached the rear of the Bourbon defensive line. Defeated in the Battle of San Giuliano, the Neapolitan army was forced to abandon Capua and retreat to the Garigliano line.

The final event of the Piedmontese expedition took place here, the Battle of Garigliano, fought on 29 October 1860, following which the Bourbon army took a final stand by barricading itself in Gaeta to defend the sovereign.

== Chronology of the campaign ==
=== First phase: Invasion of the Papal States ===
	Army occupying Marche and Umbria (Fanti)			
	fleet (Persano)	IV army corps (Cialdini)		V army corps (Morozzo della Rocca)
	fleet (Persano)	4th and 7th divisions (Cialdini)	13th division (Cadorna)	V army corps (Morozzo della Rocca)
5 September	Naval squadron sails from Genoa			
10 September	Squadron sails around the Italian peninsula into the Adriatic	Troops deploy on the border with the Marche along the river it:Tavollo, ready to divide into separate forces		Troops deploy along the border with Umbria, near Arezzo and Sansepolcro
11 September	Squadron sails around the Italian peninsula into the Adriatic	Pesaro		Città di Castello
12 September	Squadron sails around the Italian peninsula into the Adriatic	Fano	Urbino and Fossombrone	
13 September	Squadron sails around the Italian peninsula into the Adriatic	Senigallia	Cagli	Umbertide and Perugia
14 September	Squadron sails around the Italian peninsula into the Adriatic		Gubbio	
15 September	Squadron sails around the Italian peninsula into the Adriatic	Jesi	Gualdo Tadino	Foligno
16 September	Squadron sails around the Italian peninsula into the Adriatic	Osimo	Gualdo Tadino	Spoleto
17 September	Squadron sails around the Italian peninsula into the Adriatic	Osimo	Fabriano	Spoleto
18 September	Squadron sails around the Italian peninsula into the Adriatic	Battle of Castelfidardo	Fabriano	Terni, Narni and Rieti
20 September	Naval blockade of Ancona and beginning of bombardment		Macerata	
24-29 September	Siege of Ancona			
3 October	Victor Emmanuel II lands at Ancona			

=== Second phase: Invasion of the Kingdom of the Two Sicilies ===
	Piedmontese Army (Victor Emmanuel II)	Southern Army (Garibaldi)
1-2 October		Battle of the Volturno: Garibaldi’s men stop a Bourbon counterattack
6 October	The fleet sets sail from Ancona with part of the army on board. The soldiers will disembark at Manfredonia and head towards Naples through the territories of Capitanata and it:Principato Ultra	
12 October	Invasion of the Kingdom of the Two Sicilies	
12-17 October	Divided into two columns, the Piedmontese army enters Abruzzo	Battle of Pettorano: a contingent of Garibaldi's men massacred near Isernia
18 October	The two columns from L'Aquila and Chieti meet at Popoli and head for Castel di Sangro and the Terra di Lavoro	
20 October	Battle of Macerone: The Piedmontese defeat the troops sent to stop them	
26 October	Beginning of the Siege of Civitella	
26 October	Battle of San Giuliano: the Neapolitan army is forced to retreat to the Garigliano line	
26 October	Meeting at Teano	
29 October	Battle of the Garigliano: the Piedmontese army defeats the Bourbon army and forces it to retreat to the fortress of Gaeta	
5 November	Beginning of the Siege of Gaeta	
