= Piedmontese invasion of the Papal States (1860) =

1860 military conflict during Italian unification

- Part of the Italian unification
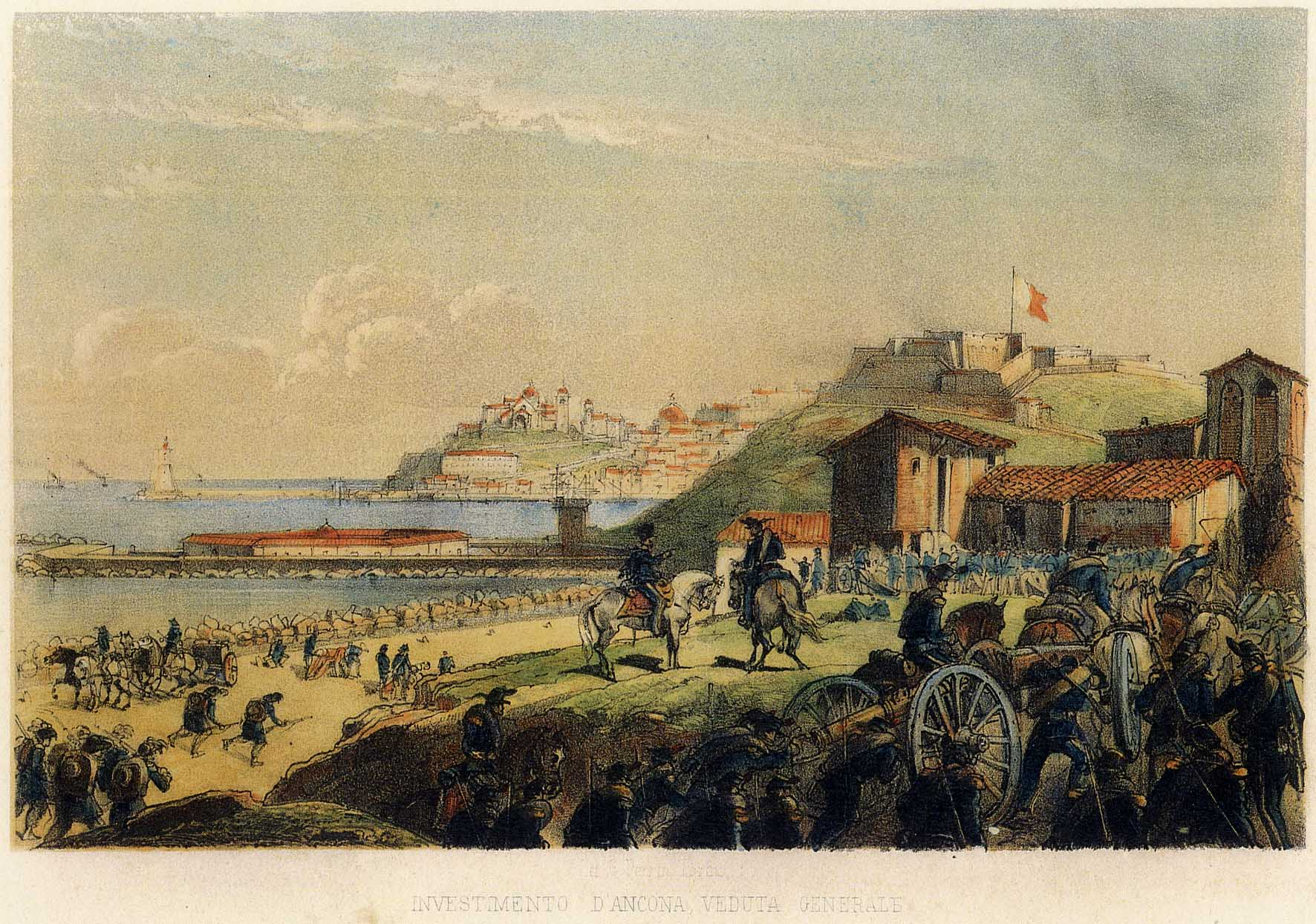
- General view of the siege of Ancona
Date	11–29 September 1860
Location	Marche and Umbria, Papal States
Result	Sardinian victory Annexation of Marche and Umbria

Belligerents
(Kingdom of Italy) Kingdom of Sardinia	Papal States

Commanders and leaders
Victor Emmanuel II; Manfredo Fanti; Enrico Cialdini	Pope Pius IX; Louis Juchault de Lamoricière; Georges de Pimodan †

Strength
33,000–40,000 men 78 guns	10,000–14,000 men 30 guns

Casualties and losses
600–800 killed or wounded	1,200 killed or wounded ~10,000 captured

The Piedmontese invasion of the Papal States (1860), also known as the Campaign in the Marche and Umbria, was a military conflict that took place between 11 and 29 September 1860. It was fought between the Kingdom of Sardinia and the Papal States during the final stages of the Italian unification.

The invasion was ordered by Sardinian Prime Minister Camillo Benso, Count of Cavour, to intercept Giuseppe Garibaldi's forces, which had recently conquered the Kingdom of the Two Sicilies during the Expedition of the Thousand. Cavour sought to prevent Garibaldi from marching on Rome, an action that would have provoked a military intervention by the French Empire, which maintained a garrison in the city to protect Pope Pius IX.

The Sardinian army invaded the papal provinces of Marche and Umbria, led by Manfredo Fanti and Enrico Cialdini. On September 18, the Papal army, commanded by the French general Louis Juchault de Lamoricière, was defeated at the Battle of Castelfidardo. This was followed by the Siege of Ancona and Lamoricière’s surrender on 29 September, after which the Sardinian forces took possession of the targeted territories. In November 1860 plebiscites approved the formal annexation of the Marche and Umbria to the Sardinian state, which in March 1861 became the Kingdom of Italy.

== Background ==
Following the Second Italian War of Independence in 1859, the Kingdom of Sardinia annexed Lombardy and several central Italian duchies. In May 1860, Giuseppe Garibaldi launched an independent expedition to Sicily, overthrowing the Bourbon monarchy in the south.

As Garibaldi advanced northward toward Naples, Cavour became concerned that the radical republican elements within Garibaldi's command would attempt to capture Rome. Pius IX was under the protection of Napoleon III, and a direct attack on Rome by Italian nationalists would have resulted in a French declaration of war against the Sardinian state. To secure the southern territories for the Sardinian crown and maintain diplomatic stability with France, Cavour decided to send the regular Sardinian army through the Papal States to link up with Garibaldi in the south, deliberately bypassing the region of Latium, which contained Rome.

== Diplomatic context ==
Cavour engaged in secret negotiations with Napoleon III at Chambéry in August 1860. Cavour argued that a Sardinian invasion of the eastern Papal States was necessary to stop Garibaldi and prevent a republican revolution. Napoleon III provided tacit approval for the Sardinian army to occupy the Marche and Umbria, on the condition that they did not approach Rome or the surrounding Patrimony of Saint Peter.

To provide a pretext for the invasion, the Sardinian government issued a formal demand to the Papal States on 7 September 1860, requesting the dismissal of foreign mercenary units in the Papal army. When the Papal Secretary of State, Cardinal Giacomo Antonelli, refused the demand on 10 September, Cavour declared that the Sardinian army would intervene to restore order and protect the Italian populations of the Marche and Umbria from papal mercenaries.

== Opposing forces ==
=== Sardinian Army ===
The Sardinian expeditionary force consisted of approximately 33,000 to 40,000 regular troops, organized into three corps. The army was equipped with 78 artillery pieces and possessed an advantage in logistics, cavalry, and rifled artillery. General Manfredo Fanti held overall command, while General Enrico Cialdini led the primary operational advance along the Adriatic coast.

=== Papal Army ===
The Papal army numbered between 10,000 and 14,000 men. Because the native Italian population of the Papal States was largely sympathetic to unification, Pius IX relied heavily on foreign volunteers. The force included Swiss, French, Austrian, Belgian, and Irish battalions. The army was commanded by Louis Juchault de Lamoricière, a former French general who had served in Algeria. The Papal forces were dispersed across various fortified towns and lacked the artillery and logistical capacity to engage in a sustained field campaign against a conventional army.

== Campaign ==
=== Initial advance and minor engagements ===
The Sardinian army crossed the border into the Marche and Umbria on 11 September 1860. Cialdini's primary column advanced south along the Adriatic coast, securing Pesaro and other coastal towns through minor skirmishes or immediate surrenders by isolated Papal garrisons. Simultaneously, the secondary column under General Enrico Della Rocca moved inland through Umbria. The Papal forces at Perugia and Spoleto offered brief resistance against light Sardinian artillery bombardments before their commanders surrendered the fortified towns.

=== Battle of Castelfidardo ===
Following the capture of the peripheral towns, the main Papal field army attempted to concentrate near the town of Castelfidardo to block the Sardinian advance toward the primary regional port of Ancona.

On 18 September, the two armies engaged. The Papal vanguard, commanded by General Georges de Pimodan, launched a series of localized counterattacks against the Sardinian positions. De Pimodan was killed during the engagement, and the Papal infantry was outflanked by Sardinian forces utilizing superior artillery fire. Lamoricière ordered a general retreat toward Ancona, but the Papal army fractured, with many units surrendering or fleeing into the countryside.

=== Siege of Ancona ===
Following the defeat at Castelfidardo, Lamoricière and the remnants of the Papal army retreated into the fortified city of Ancona. Cialdini initiated a siege on 20 September, supported by the Sardinian naval fleet, which blockaded the harbor and bombarded the coastal defenses.

The Sardinian forces captured the outer redoubts and subjected the city to continuous artillery fire. Recognizing that no relief force would arrive and that the city's supplies were depleted, Lamoricière surrendered to Cialdini on 29 September 1860. The Sardinian army took approximately 10,000 prisoners, ending the military capacity of the Papal States.

== Aftermath ==
With the Papal army neutralized, the Sardinian forces continued their advance southward into the Kingdom of Naples. On 26 October 1860, Victor Emmanuel II met with Garibaldi at Teano, where Garibaldi transferred his conquered southern territories to the Sardinian crown.

In November 1860, the Sardinian government organized plebiscites in the Marche and Umbria. The official results recorded majorities in favor of annexation to the constitutional monarchy of Victor Emmanuel II. The territories were formally incorporated, and in March 1861, the first Italian parliament convened in Turin to proclaim the Kingdom of Italy.

The Papal States were reduced to the city of Rome and the surrounding region of Latium, which remained under the sovereignty of Pius IX and the military protection of Napoleon III. This arrangement, known as the Roman Question, persisted until the Franco-Prussian War forced the withdrawal of French troops, leading to the Capture of Rome by the Italian army in September 1870.
