= Warsaw Accordion Quintet =

Polish chamber ensemble

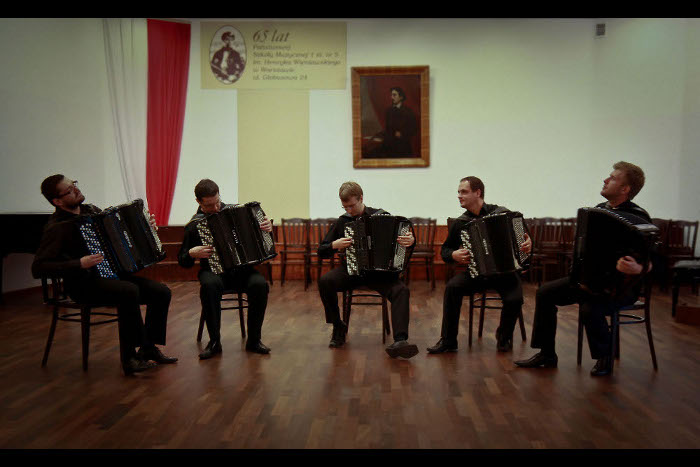
- Warsaw Accordion Quintet in 2011

Background information
- Origin: Warsaw, Poland
- Genres: Classical music, Contemporary classical music
- Occupation: Chamber ensemble
- Years active: 1961-1994, 1999-present
- Label: DUX
- Members: Maciej Kandefer, Jacek Małachowski, Przemysław Wojciechowski, Mirosław Mozol, Mateusz Wachowiak
- Past members: Włodzimierz Lech Puchnowski, Jerzy Jurek, Adam Zemła, Andrzej Zieliński, Waldemar Dubieniecki, Henryk Krzemiński, Józef Bałakier, Sławomir Ratajczyk, Jarosław Kutera, Magdalena Igras, Tomasz Holizna, Adam Czerski
- Website: http://wka.vin.pl/en/

Warsaw Accordion Quintet
W. A. Mozart - Excerpt from the overture from The Marriage of Figaro

Warsaw Accordion Quintet (Polish: Warszawski Kwintet Akordeonowy) is the Polish chamber ensemble formed in 1961 by Włodzimierz Lech Puchnowski. Since its inception, the quintet has performed about 1,600 concerts in Europe and Asia, participated in 25 festivals of contemporary music (including the Warsaw Autumn Festival) and made numerous radio and television recordings. The quintet has released 4 analog disc records and 2 CDs.

The ensemble ended its activity in 1994, but in 1999 Professor Włodzimierz Lech Puchnowski initiated the revival of the Warsaw Accordion Quintet with a completely new line-up.

== Warsaw Accordion Quintet since 1999 ==
Since 1999 Warsaw Accordion Quintet has performed over one hundred concerts, participating in chamber music festivals in Poland and abroad. The quintet has also made numerous recordings for radio and television.

The album Classical that was released in 2004 received nomination to Fryderyk 2004 Polish Music Award in the category of the Best Album - Chamber Music.

=== Awards ===
- 3rd Place: Yehudi Menuhin Bronze Prize - 5th Osaka Chamber Music Competition & Festa 2005
- 1st Place: 9th International Competition of Contemporary Chamber Music Kraków 2005
- Final: 4th Osaka Chamber Music Competition & Festa 2002
- 1st Place: Premio Citta di Castelfidardo (2001)
- 2nd Place: Accordion Music Festival From Soloists to the Orchestra in Mława / Poland (2001)
- 2nd Place: International Accordion Meeting-Festival in Sanok / Poland (2000)

=== Current members ===
- Maciej Kandefer – 1st accordion (since 1999)
- Jacek Małachowski – 2nd accordion (since 2010)
- Przemysław Wojciechowski – 3rd accordion (since 2016)
- Mirosław Mozol – 4th accordion (since 1999)
- Mateusz Wachowiak – 5th accordion (bass accordion) (since 2010)

=== Past members ===
- Jarosław Kutera – 2nd accordion ( between 1999 and 2009)
- Magdalena Igras – 3rd accordion (between 1999 and 2009)
- Adam Czerski – 3rd accordion (between 2010 and 2015), 5th accordion (between 2007 and 2009)
- Tomasz Holizna – 5th accordion (between 1999 and 2006)

=== Discography ===
- Warsaw Accordion Quintet plays Bach, Mendelssohn, Khachaturian. LP. Polskie Nagrania Muza. SXL 1148.
- Classical (2004)
