= Georges de Pimodan =

19th century French legitimist officer

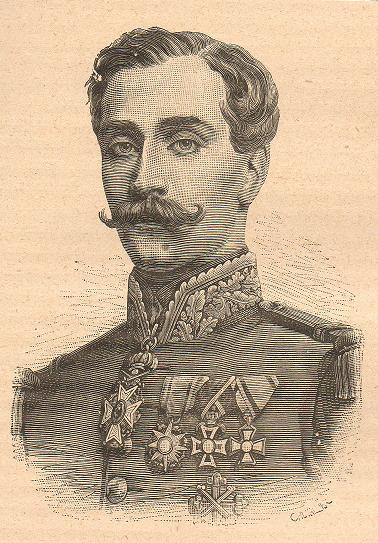
- Georges de Rarécourt de La Vallée de Pimodan
- Born: January 29, 1822; Échenay, Kingdom of France
- Died: September 18, 1860 (aged 38); Castelfidardo, Papal States
- Military career
- Allegiance: Austrian Empire; Papal States
- Service years: 1847–1860
- Rank: General; Colonel
- Conflicts: Revolutions of 1848 in the Italian states Hungarian Revolution of 1848; Expedition of the Thousand: Battle of Castelfidardo

Georges de Rarecourt de La Vallée, Marquis de Pimodan (January 29, 1822, in Échenay – September 18, 1860, in Castelfidardo), was a French legitimist émigré officer, who served Austria and the Papal States.

== Biography ==
Pimodan was the son of Camille de Pimodan, a cavalry captain and gentleman of the King's Chamber, and his wife, born Claire Fauveau de Frénilly.

He studied at the Jesuit college in Fribourg. Admitted to Saint-Cyr, he refused to take the oath of allegiance to Louis-Philippe, whose reign was too liberal for his taste and continued his military studies in Austria, where in 1847 he became a sub-lieutenant in the lancers of the Habsburg emperor. He was sent to garrison in Verona, then in the Austrian Kingdom of Lombardy-Venetia. During the revolutions of 1848 in Lombardy, Veneto and in the duchies of Parma and Modena and Reggio, which were supported by Charles Albert of Piedmont-Sardinia, he served with the Austrian troops sent to suppress the rebellions, during which he demonstrated bravery. He was appointed captain and aide-de-camp to Field Marshal Joseph Radetzky von Radetz, commander-in-chief of the Austrian troops in Italy.

He then left, under the orders of General Josip Jelačić, to suppress the Hungarian Revolution of 1848 led by Lajos Kossuth. During the battle of Moor (Komorn), Pimodan, together with a handful of men, took an enemy battery. Having left on reconnaissance, he was taken prisoner by the revolutionaries in Peterwardein, by whom he was condemned to death. He owed his survival to the defeat of the Hungarian army of Artúr Görgey on August 23, 1849. He was named major and count.

In 1850, he published "Souvenirs et scènes de la guerre d’Italie sous le maréchal Radetzky" (Memories and Scenes of the War in Italy under Marshal Radetzky) in the Revue des deux Mondes, followed, in 1851, by "Souvenirs de la guerre de Hongrie sous le prince Windischgraetz et le ban Jellachich" (Memories of the War in Hungary under Prince Windischgraetz and Ban Jellachich), also in the Revue des deux Mondes: the two works were later published together by Allouard and Kaeppelin under the title Souvenirs des campagnes d’Italie et de Hongrie (Memories of the campaigns of Italy and Hungary).

At thirty-three, he was made a colonel. He resigned, returned to France and married, on March 29, 1855, Emma de Couronnel, a daughter of a gentilhomme of Charles X.

A devout Catholic, he joined the ranks of the Papal Army in April 1860, under the command of Lamoricière, and was subsequently appointed chief of staff. He took part in the battles to defend the borders of the Papal States and was promoted to general on August 3.

In September 1860, the papal troops commanded by Lamoricière moved on Ancona, where they were stopped by the fire of the Piedmontese artillery posted on the heights of Castelfidardo. Pimodan was tasked with attacking the cannons. He died during the attack.

Pius IX conferred the title of duke on his descendants.

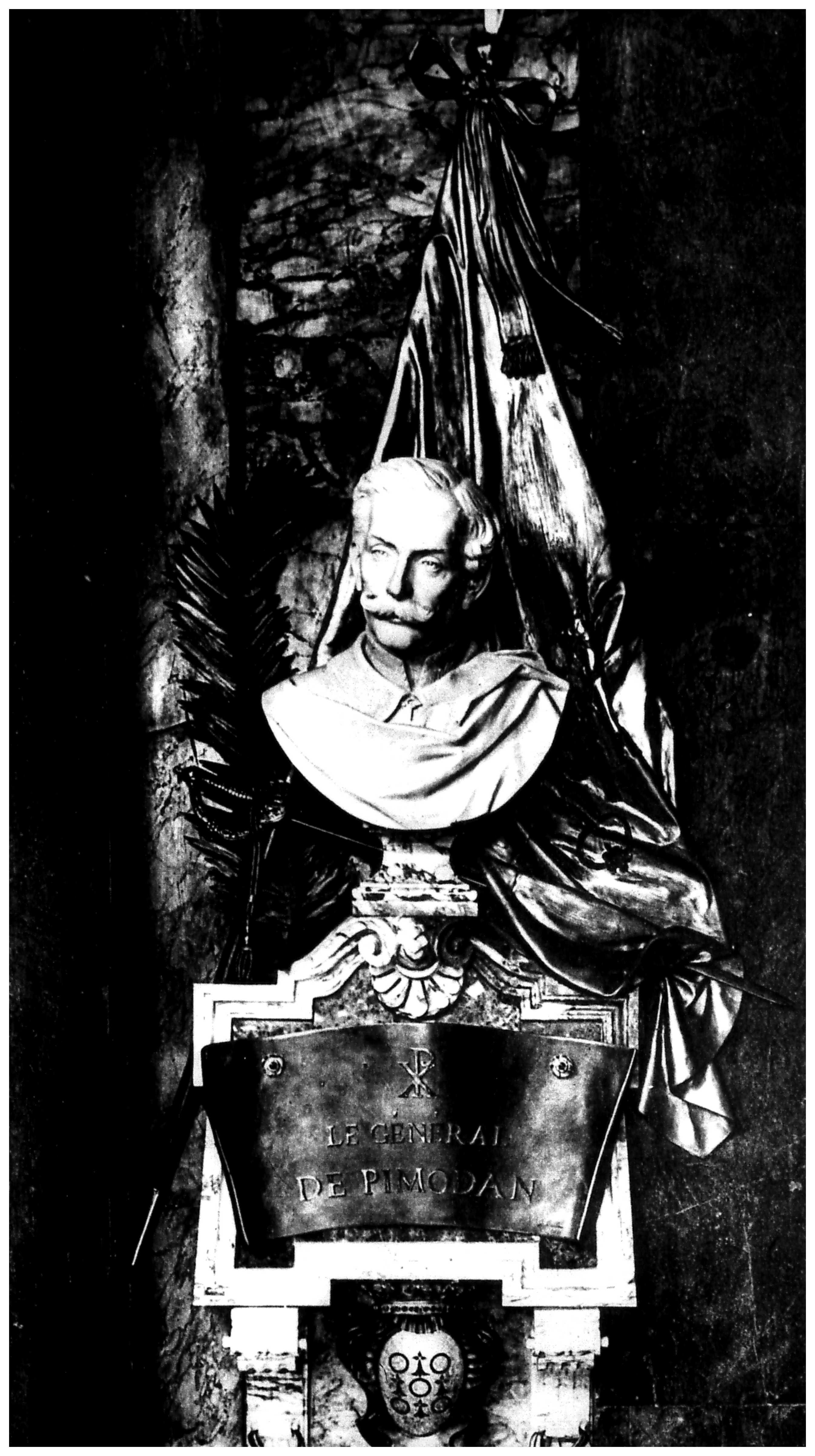
Tomb of Georges de Pimodan in the Church of St. Louis of the French in Rome.

== Family ==
On March 29, 1855, Pimodan married Emma de Couronnel, a granddaughter of the Duke of Montmorency-Laval.

- His son Gabriel (December 16, 1856 – 1924) was a historian and a poet. Among other things, he published a life of his father, Poésies (1875) and Histoire d'une vieille maison le Château d'Echenay (1882). He was general councilor of Haute-Marne and mayor of Échenay.
- His other son Claude Emmanuel Henri Marie (1859-1931) was an officer and military attaché at the French legation in Japan. He published Promenades en Extrême-Orient, in which he recounted his travels between 1895 and 1898 (Paris Honoré Champion 1900). Around 1895 he married Georgina de Mercy-Argenteau, the last descendant of the Mercy-Argenteau family, Lord of Ochain in Clavier, Belgium. One of their sons, Georges, married Mathilde Pillet-Will, granddaughter of Frédéric Pillet-Will.

== Honours ==
- Knight of the Austrian Imperial Order of Leopold
- Commander of the Belgian Order of Leopold
- Knight of Grace Second Class with plaque of the Constantinian Order of Saint George (Parma)
- Commander of the Military Order of Maria Theresa
- Knight of the Order of Pius IX

== Bibliography ==
- Gabriel de Pimodan: Vie du Général de Pimodan (1822-1860) published by the Duchess of Pimodan, with 12 collotypes HT old library Champion 1928
- Les Gloires militaires contemporaines de la France Paris Maison de la Bonne Presse around 1890
- Marquis de Ségur: Les martyrs de Castelfidardo, Tolra edition, Paris 1891
- Pious remembrance of General de Pimodan and his companions for the fiftieth anniversary of the Battle of Castelfidardo.
