= Siege of Ancona (1860) =

1860 siege during the Italian unification

- Part of the Italian unification
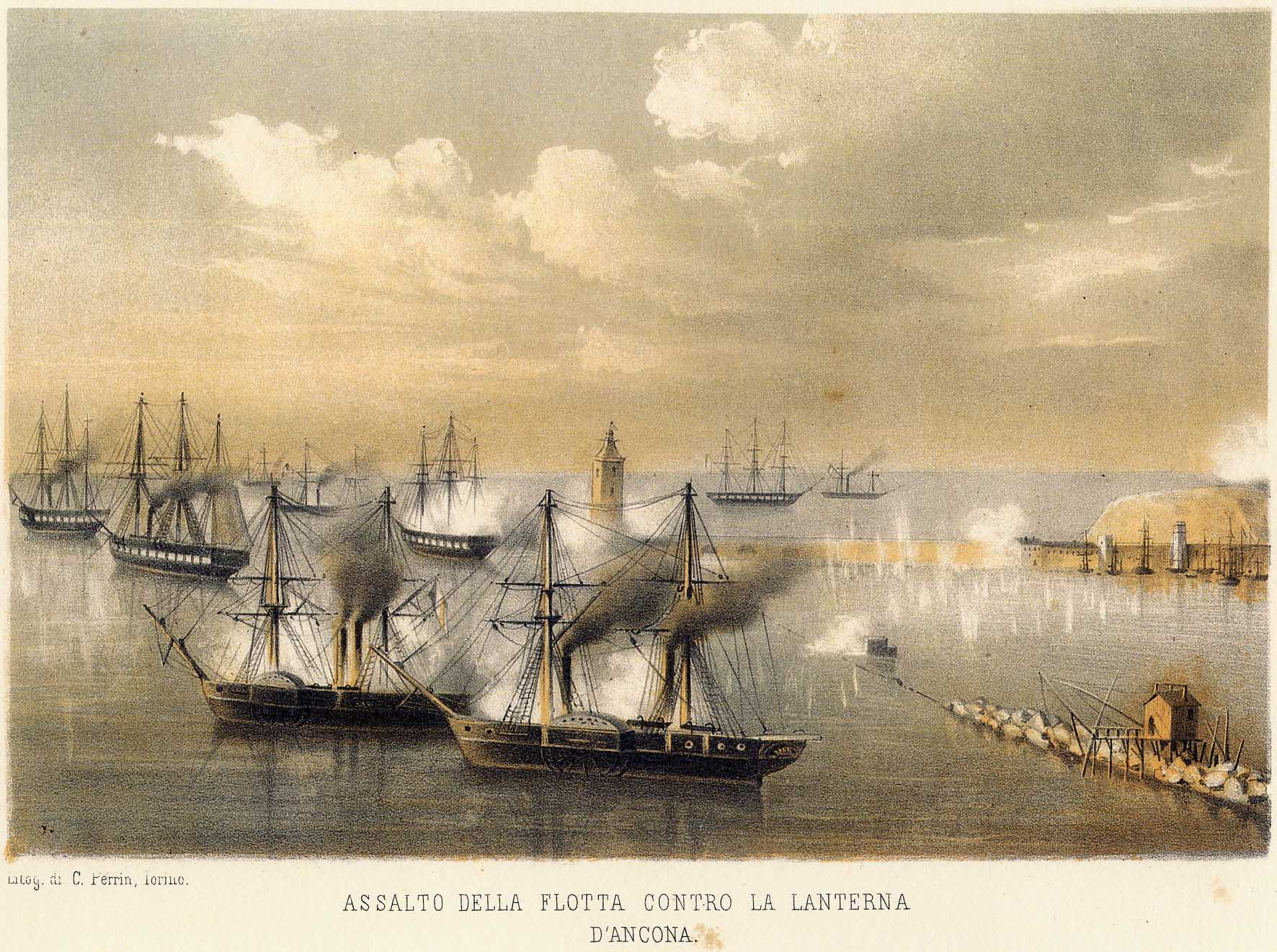
- The naval bombardment and explosion of the Forte della Lanterna
Date	24–29 September 1860
Location	Ancona, Papal States 43°36′26″N 13°30′37″E
Result	Sardinian victory
Territorial changes	Annexation of the Marche and Umbria by the Kingdom of Sardinia

Belligerents
(Kingdom of Italy) Kingdom of Sardinia	Papal States

Commanders and leaders
Manfredo Fanti; Carlo Pellion di Persano	Louis Juchault de Lamoricière; Hermann Kanzler

Strength
~16,500 men Naval squadron	4,100–6,000 men 129 guns

Casualties and losses
~180 killed or wounded	~400 killed or wounded 4,100–6,000 captured 4 civilians killed

The Siege of Ancona took place between 24 and 29 September 1860 during the Piedmontese campaign in central Italy. Following their defeat at the Battle of Castelfidardo, the remnants of the Papal States army under General Louis Juchault de Lamoricière retreated into the port city of Ancona. The city was blockaded by the Royal Sardinian Navy and surrounded on land by the Royal Sardinian Army commanded by General Manfredo Fanti. After a combined land and sea bombardment that resulted in the destruction of the Forte della Lanterna, the Papal garrison surrendered on 29 September. The capture of Ancona secured the Marche and Umbria regions for the Kingdom of Sardinia, facilitating the subsequent unification of northern and southern Italy.

== Background ==
On 18 September 1860, the Papal field army was defeated by Sardinian forces at the Battle of Castelfidardo. Following the rout, General Lamoricière abandoned his main forces and fled toward the coast with a small escort of cavalry. While Sardinian troops attempted to intercept him near Numana, Lamoricière utilized coastal paths and arrived in Ancona on the evening of 18 September to take command of the city's defenses.

Ancona was a primary naval base and fortress in the Adriatic. Lamoricière intended to hold the city to await reinforcements and supplies from Catholic European powers via the sea.

== Opposing forces ==
=== Sardinian forces ===
The Sardinian land forces surrounding Ancona numbered approximately 16,500 men under the overall command of General Manfredo Fanti. The naval blockade and bombardment were conducted by a squadron of the Royal Sardinian Navy commanded by Admiral Carlo Pellion di Persano. The fleet included the steam frigates Maria Adelaide (flagship), Vittorio Emanuele, and Carlo Alberto, the corvettes Costituzione and Governolo, and several other vessels. The Sardinian warships were equipped with Paixhans guns and rifled artillery capable of firing heavy explosive shells.

=== Papal forces ===
The Papal garrison consisted of between 4,100 (according to Papal records) and 6,000 men (according to Sardinian prisoner counts), including remnants of the field army and local defense units. The defenses were armed with 129 artillery pieces of various calibers, including mortars and 36-pounder guns. The harbor entrance was obstructed by wooden pilings, a heavy iron chain stretched between the piers, and armed floating pontoons.

== Siege ==
=== Naval blockade and initial engagements ===
The Sardinian naval presence began on 16 September when the frigate Costituzione conducted a reconnaissance mission off the harbor. On 18 September, an exchange of artillery fire occurred between the Papal coastal forts and Persano's ships. By 24 September, Sardinian land forces had captured the Lunetta Scrima outwork, completing the encirclement of the city. Over the next two days, Sardinian troops engaged Papal outposts and secured the strategic heights of Monte Pulito and Monte Pelago.

During the siege, an assassination attempt was made on Lamoricière while he was inspecting the fortress parapets. A local Papal soldier was accused of firing the shot, but was subsequently cleared following an investigation and the testimony of General Hermann Kanzler.

=== Land and sea assaults ===
Sardinian forces advanced toward the Borgo Pio district and bombarded Porta Pia in an attempt to breach the city walls. Concurrently, the XVI Bersaglieri Battalion executed an amphibious assault using small boats, successfully capturing the Lazzaretto. Once the Lazzaretto fell into Sardinian hands, it was subjected to crossfire from the remaining Papal fortifications.

On 28 September, the Sardinian army launched a major infantry assault against Porta Farina and Porta Calamo, but the attack was repelled by the defenders. The decisive action occurred at sea. Admiral Persano concentrated the fire of his warships on the Forte della Lanterna, which guarded the harbor mouth. A Sardinian shell struck the fort's powder magazine, causing a massive explosion that destroyed the structure and killed approximately 125 Austrian artillerymen stationed inside.

=== Surrender ===
With the loss of the Lazzaretto and the Forte della Lanterna, the harbor was breached, and the city's sea defenses were neutralized. Recognizing that no foreign relief force would arrive in time, Lamoricière ordered the cessation of hostilities. The formal unconditional surrender was signed on 29 September 1860 at Villa Favorita, outside the city.

== Aftermath ==
The fall of Ancona resulted in the capture of the remaining Papal forces in the region and the seizure of the fortress's artillery. The Sardinian victory secured the annexation of the Marche and Umbria, which was formalized through plebiscites in November 1860. This territorial expansion connected the northern domains of the House of Savoy with the southern territories recently conquered by Giuseppe Garibaldi.

On 3 October 1860, King Victor Emmanuel II arrived in Ancona aboard the Governolo. He was received by military salutes and entered the city, later departing to meet Garibaldi at Teano.

== Defenses of Ancona in 1860 ==
The city's defenses were divided into sea and land fortifications. The sea defenses included the Forte della Lanterna, the Lazzaretto, and batteries located on the Cappuccini and Cardeto hills, as well as the port walls. The land defenses were anchored by the Cittadella, the Campo Trincerato, the Lunetta Santo Stefano, and the Baluardo di San Paolo. The distribution of the 129 recorded artillery pieces was as follows:

Artillery distribution of the Ancona garrison (1860)
Location	Pieces	Location	Pieces
Cittadella	25	Porta Pia (upper battery)	2
Campo Trincerato	29	Porta Pia (lower battery)	4
Cappuccini	10	Ripa (upper battery)	1
Monte Marano	5	Ripa (lower battery)	2
Batteria Sanità	3	Lazzaretto	3
Batteria del Molo	4	Corte di S. Domenico	4
Lanterna (upper battery)	4	Monte Gardetto (Cardeto)	10
Lanterna (lower battery)	8	Lunetta Santo Stefano	5
S. Agostino	2	Batteria Montata	6
Cittadella reserve	2		
Total sea defense	54	Total land defense	75
Total artillery pieces			129

== Gallery ==
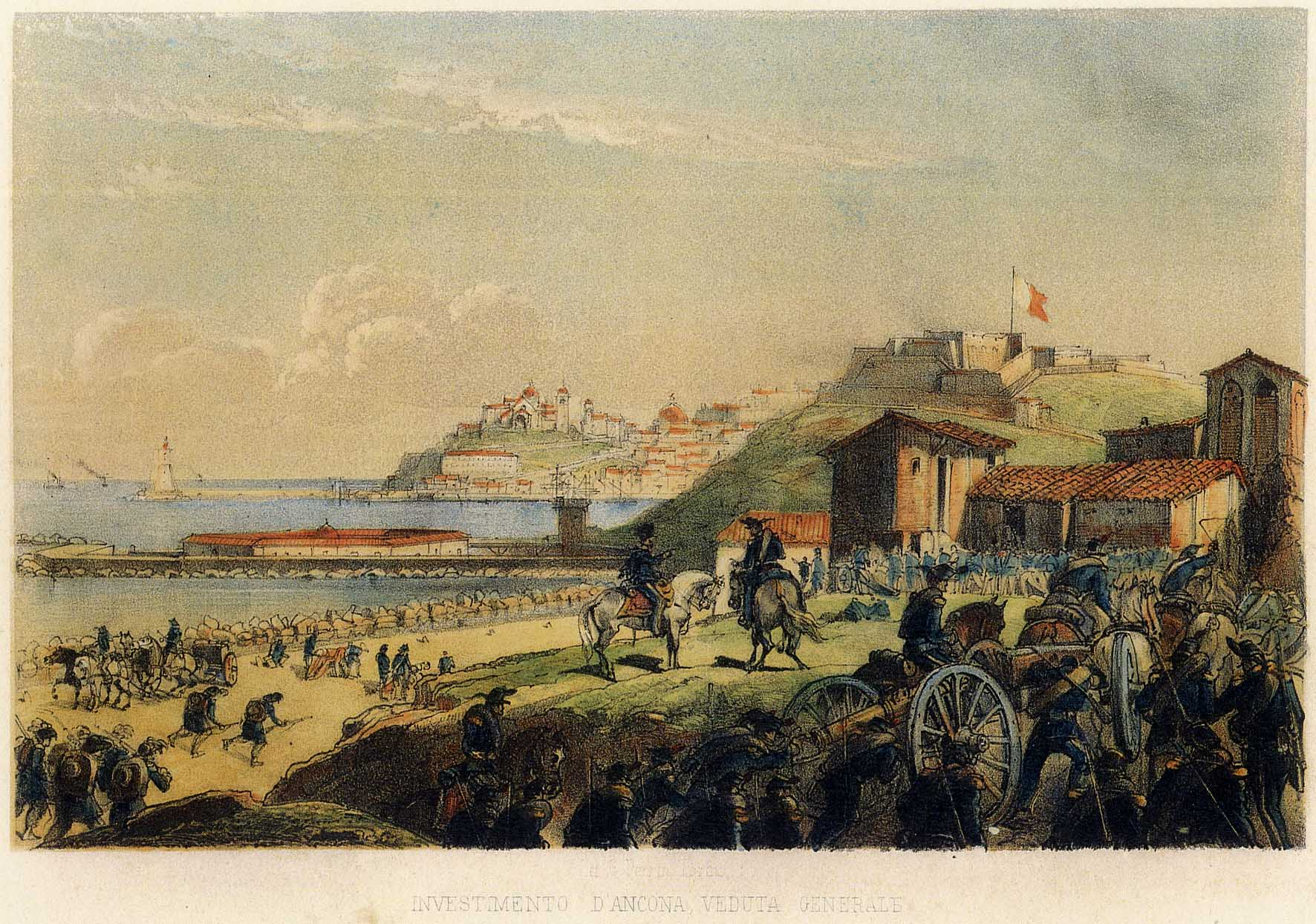
General view of the siege of Ancona

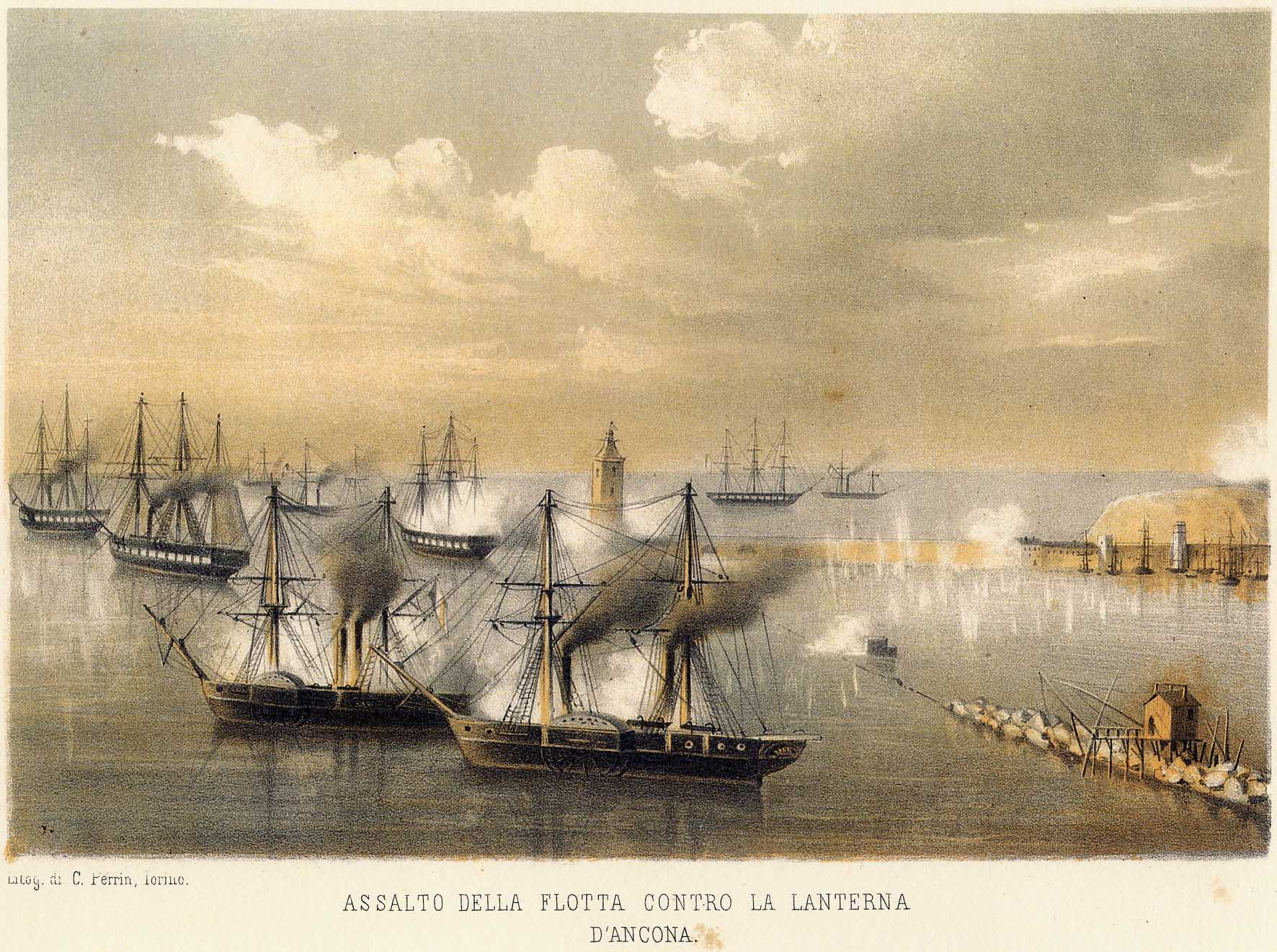
Bombardment of the Forte della Lanterna

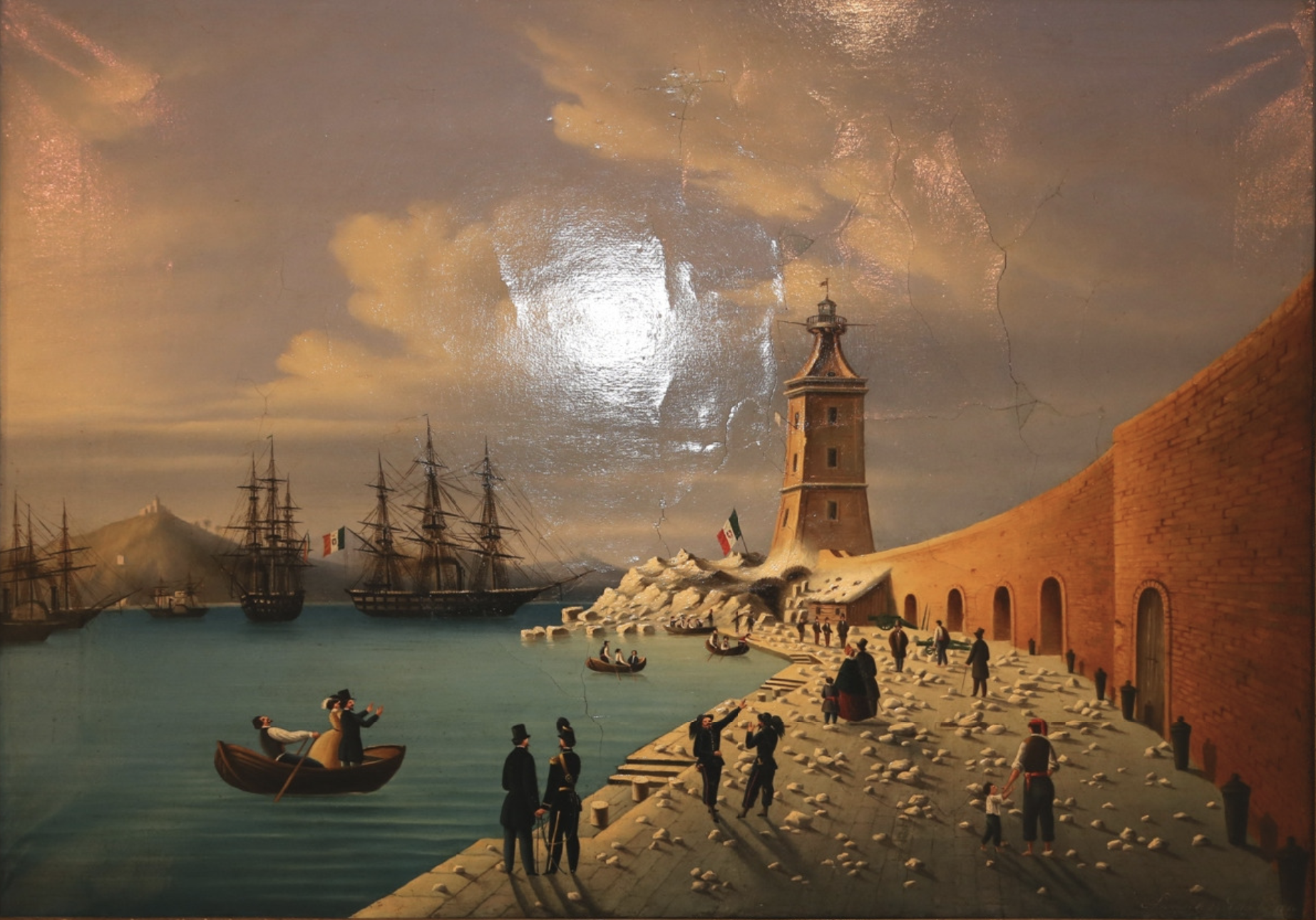
The Forte della Lanterna after the explosion of its powder magazine

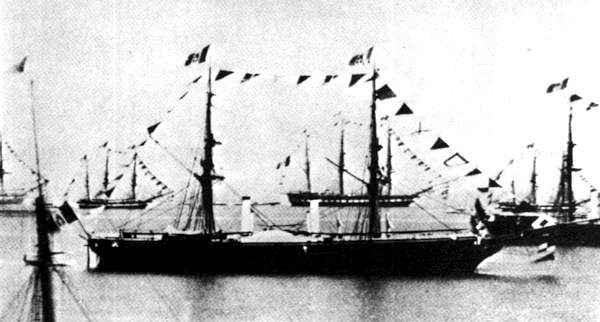
The Sardinian steam frigate Costituzione

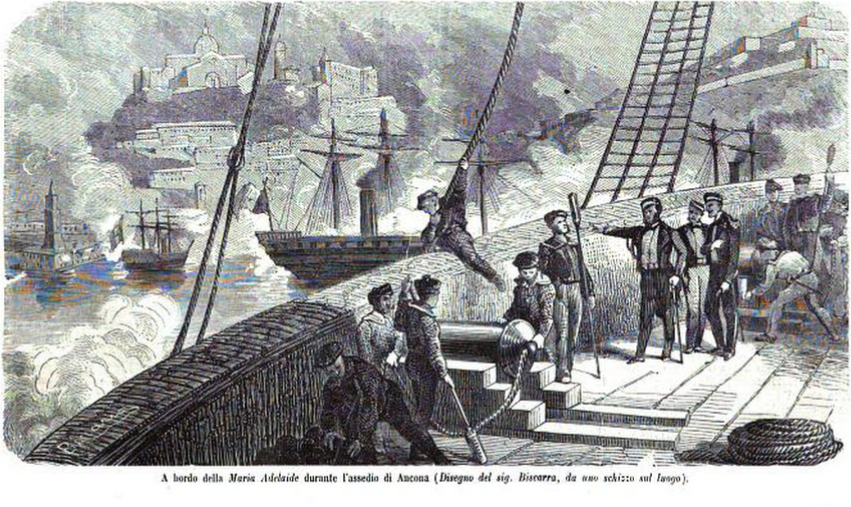
The Sardinian flagship Maria Adelaide

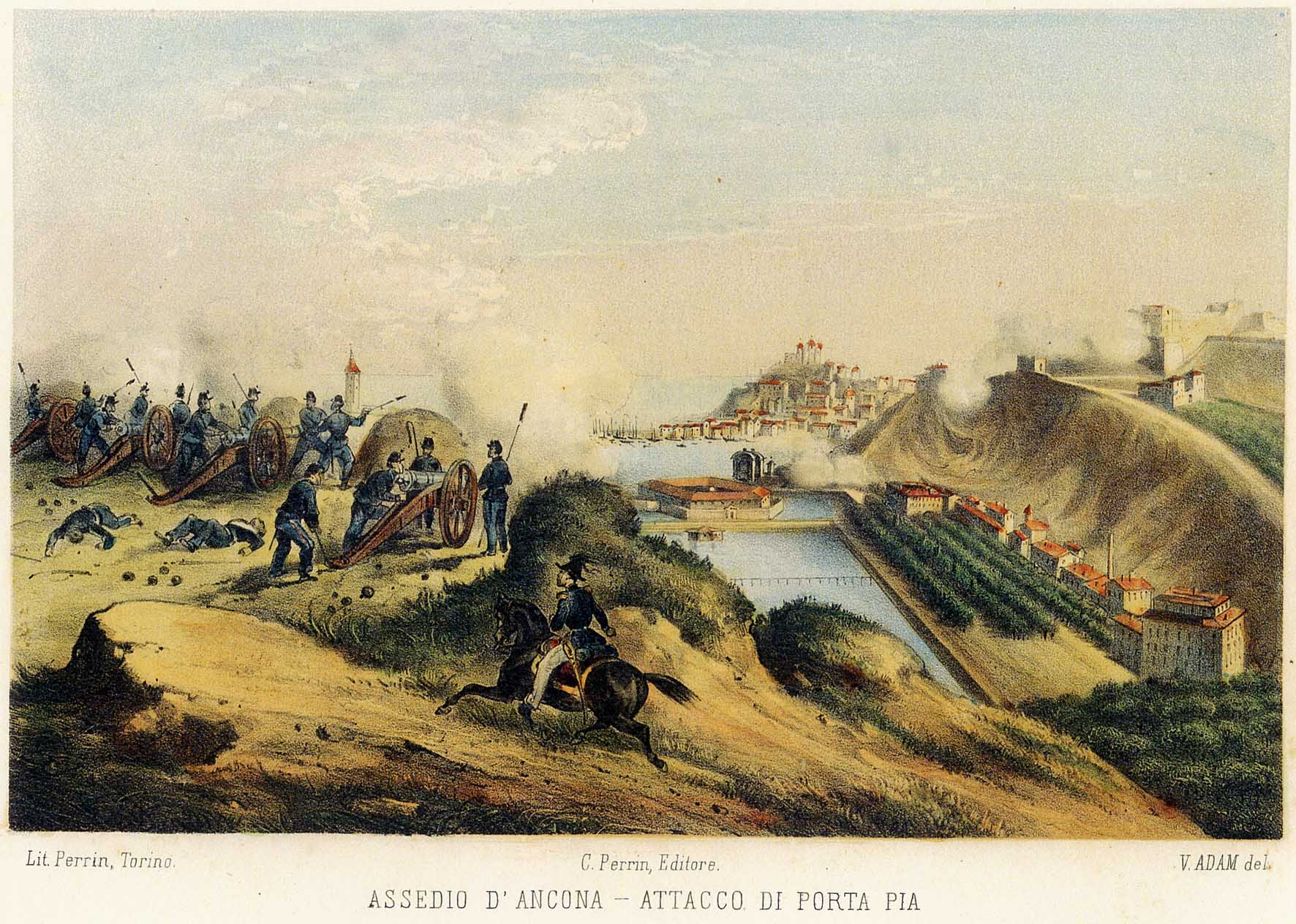
Sardinian attack on Porta Pia

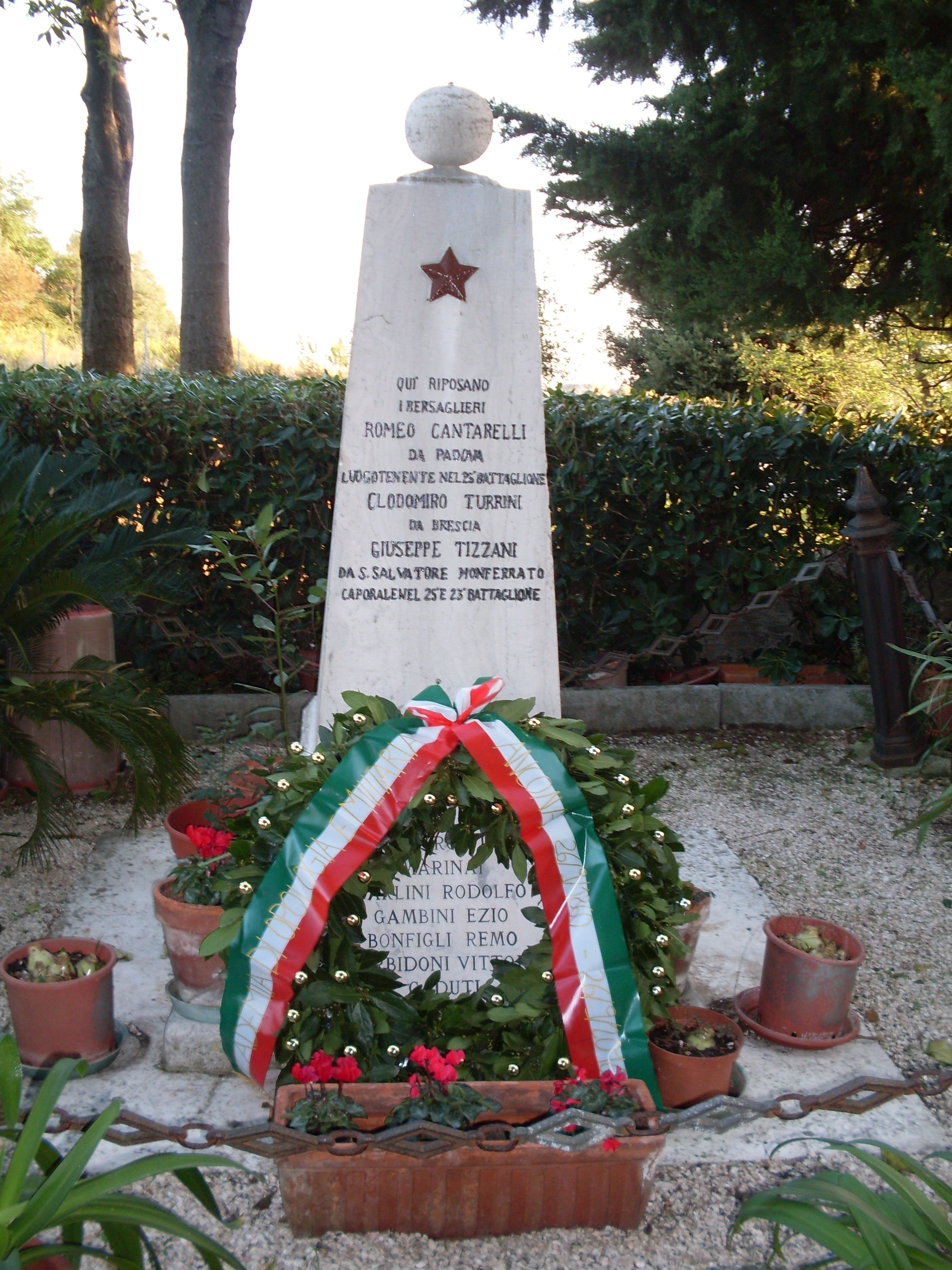
Monument to the fallen Sardinian soldiers at Monte Pelago

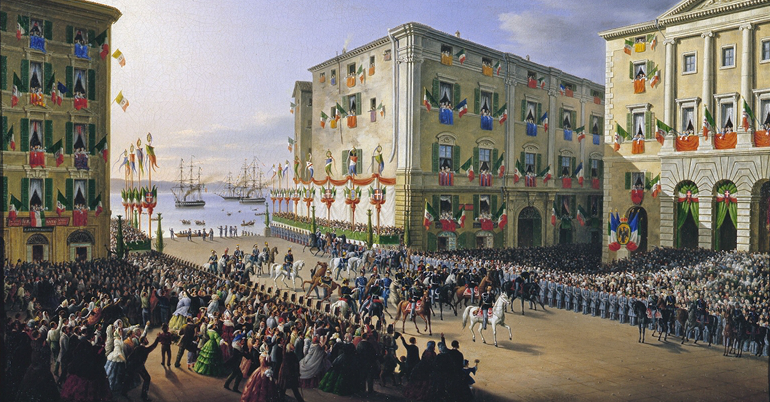
Victor Emmanuel II enters Ancona on 3 October 1860

== See also ==
- Piedmontese invasion of the Papal States (1860)
- Battle of Castelfidardo
