= Palombarone =

Former archbishop's residence in the municipality of Castelfidardo

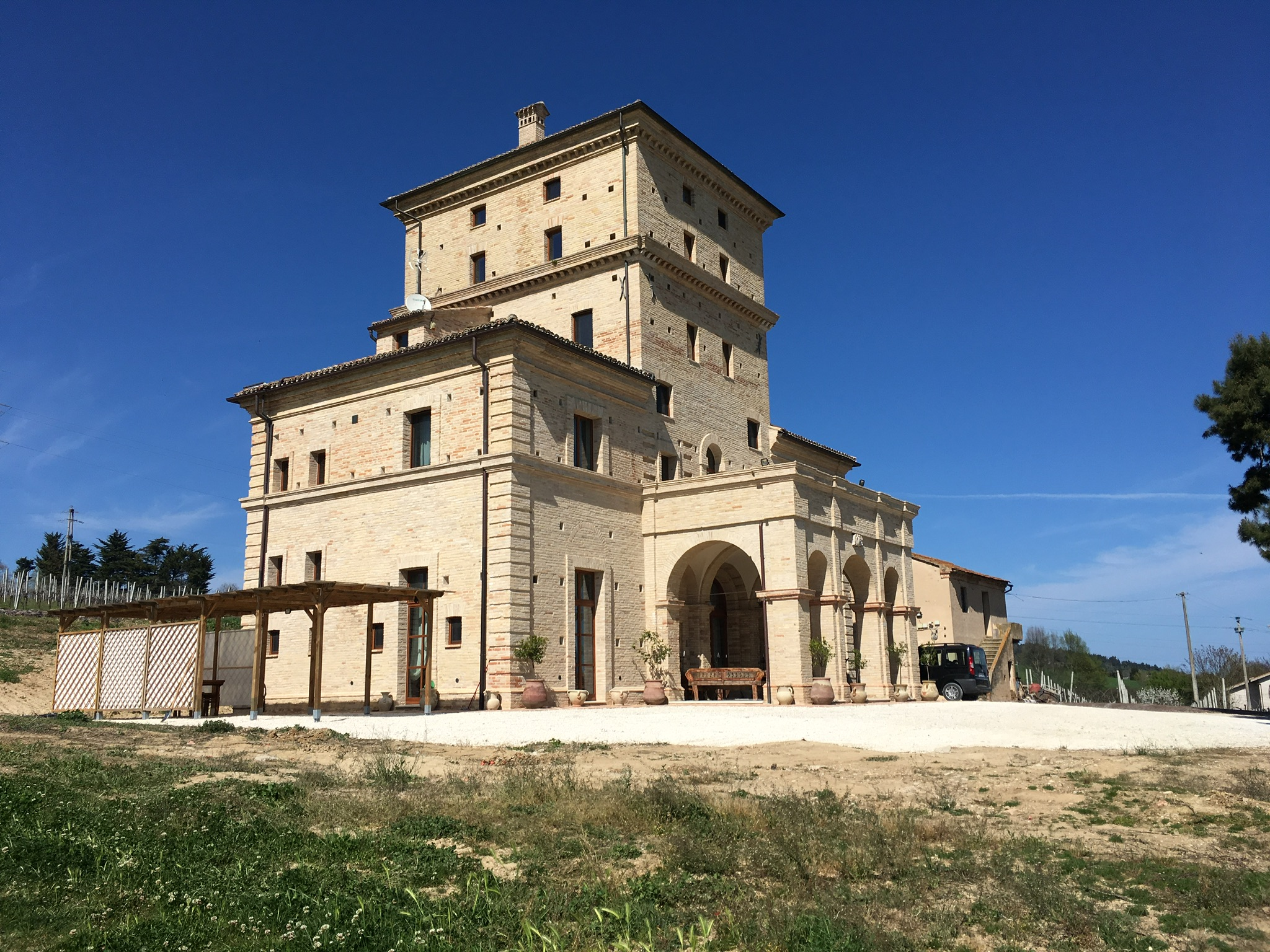
Side view of Il Palombarone

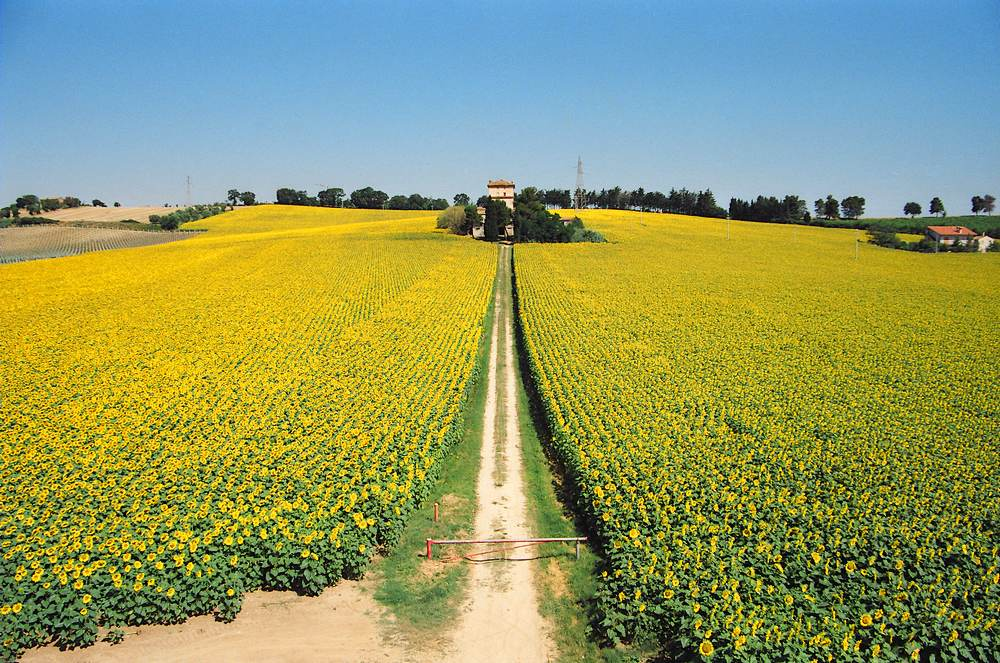
The Palombarone whilst surrounded by sunflower fields

Il Palombarone is a 16th-century construction in Castelfidardo, the Marches in Central Italy.

== Structure ==
The building has three principal sections - a four-storey central portion which is undoubtedly the oldest part of the structure, with two-storey wings on either side. Thus in essence the building is a central tower with lower wings on either side.

== History ==
To the best of common knowledge the building now dubbed the 'Palombarone' was originally erected in 1580 as the summer residence for the local Archbishop, also the Governor of the Basilica of the Holy House of nearby Loreto. It was a property of the Roman Catholic Church. It dominated the landscape for miles around due to its elevated position. Its presumed nature as an ecclesiastical residence may be not entirely accurate due to the presence of small square slanted breaches which are scattered across the tower section of the building. The purpose of these holes is not known but two principal theories exist - they are either the holes through which small cannons could be discharged, thus making the Palombarone a small fort used to guard an ancient border between lands now forgotten, or more probably to protect against Turkish invasions of the 16th century – the Ottomans were at the gates of Vienna at this time; or the holes served as perches for carrier pigeons - who were used extensively at this time and a thriving local market in the bird existed in this period.

The building is believed to have fallen into disrepair with the end of the Papal States in the 1860s – it was probably around that time that local families moved in and rented the properties surrounding this property (which to this day is used as vineyards). The farmer-occupiers of the property eventually left the property in the mid-1970s and the building was abandoned. Extensive renovations to the property occurred in 1896 (as a simple marble plaque states on the front of the building) and again, most probably in the 1950s. In 2000, the property was bought by the great-granddaughter of a woman who was born in the building a century and a half before, Renata Simonetti Giorgi. She and her family have been renovating the dilapidated building since mid-2002 in an attempt to restore it to its former glory years of the late 16th century, and as can be seen from the photo, huge progress has been made.

The building is in the 16th-century style of the local area, with masterful arches and a domed interior. The walls are extraordinarily thick, which tends to hold the interior temperature cool in the summer and warm in winter.
