= Siege of Gaeta (1860–1861) =

Battle of the war between the Sardinian and Sicilian kingdoms of Italy

Coordinates: 41°13′19″N 13°33′17″E

- Part of the unification of Italy
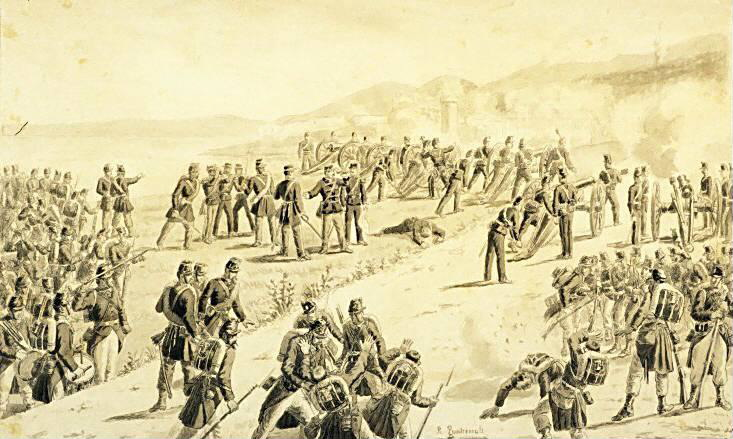
- Illustration by Raffaele Pontremoli, c. 1880
Date	5 November 1860 – 13 February 1861
Location	Gaeta, Kingdom of the Two Sicilies
Result	Sardinian victory

Belligerents
Sardinia	Two Sicilies

Commanders and leaders
(Kingdom of Sardinia) Enrico Cialdini (Kingdom of Sardinia) Tommaso De Cristoforis	Pietro Carlo Maria Vial de Maton

Strength
18,000 infantry 180 guns 10 ships	20,000 infantry 450 guns 17 ships

Casualties and losses
46 killed 321 wounded	829 killed 2,000 wounded

The siege of Gaeta was the concluding event of the war between the Kingdom of Sardinia and the Kingdom of the Two Sicilies, part of the unification of Italy. It started on 5 November 1860 and ended on 13 February 1861, and took place in Gaeta, in today's Southern Lazio (Italy).

== Background ==
In September 1860, as the Garibaldine troops were moving towards the capital Naples (see Expedition of the Thousand), the king of Two Sicilies, Francis II, decided to leave the city on the advice of his Prime Minister Liborio Romano.

At first, he planned to organise a resistance in Capua. However, after Capua was lost to the Garibaldines in the aftermath of the battle of the Volturnus (October), he and his wife Marie Sophie took refuge in the strong coastal fortress of Gaeta.

Gaeta was one of the strongest military fortresses in Europe. It consisted of a triangle-shaped promontory (Mount Orlando) which stretched for more than one and a half kilometers and rose to 169 m and with almost vertical cliffs on the seaward sides. The cliff was connected to the mainland by a 600 m wide isthmus. Called Montesecco ("Dry Mountain"), the isthmus was the only way for a besieger to conquer the stronghold. The ships of the time were indeed considered too fragile to face the massive fortifications that encircled the promontory. Built in the time of emperor Charles V, the promontory was provided with 220 guns divided between 19 batteries. An additional 230 guns defended the fortress on the mainland side, making a total of 450 cannons, 26 of which were short range mortars. Most of the guns were smoothbore arms, some dating back to the 18th century, and therefore rather imprecise. The massive castle, which commanded the east side on the sea, dated from the time of Emperor Frederick II but was continuously updated. The forces amounted to 19,700 sub-officers and soldiers and 1,770 officers; there were also 3,000 citizens of Gaeta. 17 ships of various nations (including Spain and France) kept open communications with the sea.

The Piedmontese forces were composed of the IV Army Corps, led by general Enrico Cialdini. His staff included the engineer general Luigi Federico Menabrea, future prime minister of Italy. Troops were composed of 808 officers and 15,500 sub-officers and soldiers, supported by 78 modern rifled guns, 65 mortars and 34 smoothbore guns. The most modern rifled ordnance could fire from a distance up to five kilometers without risking any harm from the aged guns of the defenders. The Piedmontese fleet, under admiral Carlo di Persano, had ten ships.

The commander of the fortress of Gaeta was Francesco Millon, a Neapolitan general, who on 10 November was replaced by Pietro Carlo Maria Vial de Maton, an 83-year-old native of Nice. The actual command, however, was placed into the hands of the Swiss Baron General Felix von Schumacher from Lucerne, aide-de-camp and fatherly friend of King Francis II and Queen Marie Sophie. He was assisted by the Swiss Generals August de Riedmatten and Josef Sigrist. The former was responsible for the seaside front, the latter for the mainland front. But instead of Josef Sigrist it was the Neapolitan Baron Colonel Gabriele Ussani who commanded this part. The engineering arm was led by the Neapolitan Count General Francesco Traversa. General Schumacher's aide-de-camp was Alphons Pfyffer von Altishofen who later became the Chief of General Staff of the Swiss army and the initiator and commander of the Swiss fort guarding the Gotthard Pass and rail tunnel. A painting by the German history painter Karl Theodor Piloty shows him and General Schumacher with Queen Marie Sophie on the ramparts of Gaeta. (Pfyffer also built the Belle Epoque National Grand Hotel in Lucerne and employed and promoted Cesar Ritz, of whom the Prince of Wales said, "He is the king of the hoteliers and the hotelier of the kings".)

The Swiss had served the Kingdom of the Two Sicilies since 1734, and it was General Schumacher's father, Head of the Military Department of the Republic of Lucerne, who had renewed the contract in 1825. Since then four Swiss regiments had formed the back-bone of the Neapolitan army until 1859. His son had entered the service in the 1st regiment in 1833 and soon became the personal aide-de-camp of Ferdinand II who commissioned him to weaponize the Neapolitan army.

== Beginning of the siege ==
Various dates are cited as the beginning of the siege; these range from 5 to 12 November. Cialdini installed his command position in Castellone, in what is today the city of Formia. Eighteen kilometers of roads, together with 15 bridges and causeways, were built for the transport of the artillery.

The situation for the soldiers and the inhabitants, massed in the very reduced space of the old city, soon proved unbearable. The Neapolitan troops had neither blankets nor change of clothing. On 18 November the bombing was stopped to allow all the people not participating in the defence to leave the city.

The morale of the defenders, however, increased when veteran general Ferdinando Beneventano del Bosco, one of the few charismatic military figures of the Kingdom of Two Sicilies, arrived in Gaeta. He soon organized a sally for dawn on 29 November. 400 Chasseurs, supported by some foreign Carabiniers, managed to reach the summit of Montesecco, near the Roman mausoleum of Lucius Atratinus. However, they were repulsed by the Piedmontese reaction, and the action proved inconclusive. The last active operation of the Neapolitans happened on 4 December, also without any effect.

The Flag of the Kingdom of the Two Sicilies in 1860–1861.

== Sues for peace ==
On 8 December, Francis II issued a proclamation to all his subjects, promising new liberties in lieu of the prosecution of the struggle against the invaders, inciting them to guerrilla operations. The same day, Cialdini was ordered by the Piedmontese Prime Minister Cavour, to cease fire. Cavour, backed by the British government, had convinced Napoleon III to recall the French fleet from Gaeta and, in a letter sent on 11 December, asked Francis II to leave Gaeta. However, the Neapolitan King did not accept the proposal. He in turn appealed to Napoleon not to recall his fleet, in order at least to save the military honour of the Kingdom and the Crown.

Hostilities began again on the night of 13–14 December. In the meantime, epidemic typhus had begun to spread within the walls of Gaeta: Francis' field adjutant was himself struck down and died on 12 December.

More victims among the civil population were caused by the new Piedmontese batteries firing from Monte Tortano from 15 December.

On 27 December, a new capitulation proposal was sent to the Neapolitan defenders or, as an alternative, a truce of 15 days. They were both rejected. The artillery duel restarted with increasing violence: 500 shells a day were hurled against Gaeta, although most of them did not explode. The bombardment culminated on 7 January 1861, when the fortress received a shower of 8,000 shells, although, again, with modest results.

== End of the siege ==
The military operation was suspended for ten days on 9 January, at the request of Napoleon III. When the armistice ended, foreign ships abandoned the harbour of Gaeta. The Piedmontese fleet, until then inactive in the port at Castellone, began a blockade, starting to bomb the fortress again on 22 January. The Piedmontese launched 22,000 grenades and the Neapolitans replied with 11,000, damaging some of the opponents' batteries.

However, the defenders' situation appeared hopeless at that point despite the efforts of the two sovereigns to raise the morale of the soldiers and the population by their personal example. The hygiene conditions within the fortress had sunk desperately, and food was short. On the afternoon of 5 February, a powder depot of the St. Antonio battery was struck by a Piedmontese grenade, destroying an entire quarter of Gaeta causing huge losses among the soldiers and the population. The last truce of the siege was declared in the evening of the following day to rescue the wounded.

The Piedmontese fire was getting increasingly accurate, and the situation for both defenders and inhabitants looked desperate. On 10 February, Maria Sophie received a letter from the French empress, saying that the resistance had been prolonged enough to save the Crown's honour. Francis II issued for a capitulation. Cialdini refused to stop the bombardment during the negotiations, and Gaeta suffered new devastations until the capitulation was signed on 13 February. The last shells were fired by both the opponents at 18.15 p.m. that day.

The first Piedmontese infantry entered Gaeta one day later, exactly when Francis II and his wife consigned themselves to the victors, hailed by the Neapolitans soldiers who had remained faithful until the very end. The Kingdom of Two Sicilies ended some days later when the last organized centre of resistance, Civitella del Tronto, surrendered on 20 March 1861.

Casualties amounted to 829 dead and 2,000 wounded for the Neapolitans. Two hundred civilians fell during the siege, while the Piedmontese had 46 dead and 321 wounded. General Enrico Cialdini was later created Duke of Gaeta by the King of Italy as a victory title in recognition of his role during the siege.

== See also ==
- The Piedmontese campaign in central Italy, 1860
