= Battle of Castelfidardo =

1860 battle of the Risorgimento fought between the Piedmontese and Papal armies

- Part of the Piedmontese invasion of the Papal States (1860) and the Italian Unification
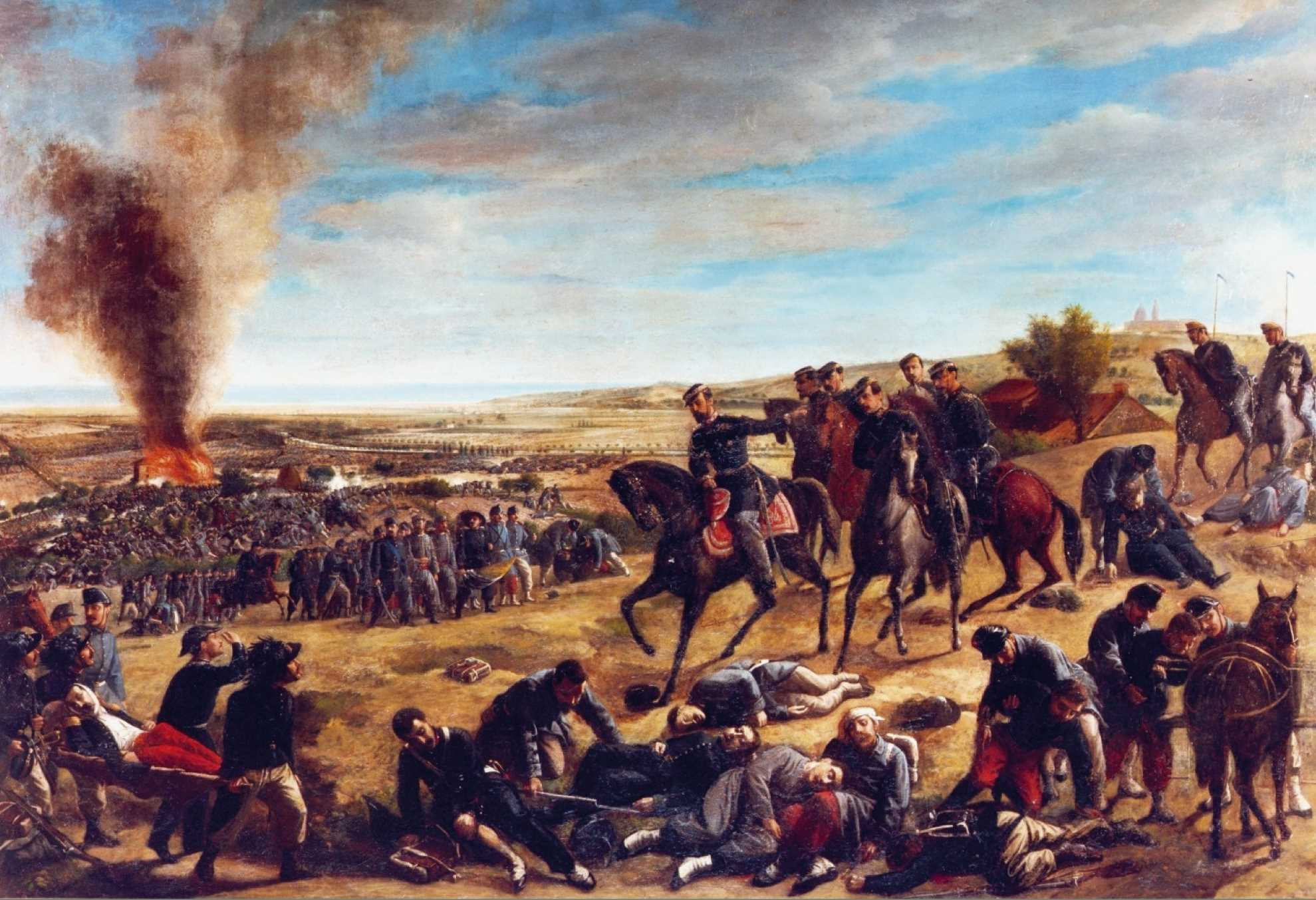
- La battaglia di Castelfidardo by Giovanni Gallucci
Date	18 September 1860
Location	Castelfidardo, Papal States (present-day Italy) 43°13′N 13°23′E
Result	Sardinian victory

Belligerents
(Kingdom of Italy) Kingdom of Sardinia	Papal States

Commanders and leaders
Enrico Cialdini; Manfredo Fanti	Louis de Lamoricière; Georges de Pimodan †

Strength
4,880 engaged	6,550 engaged

Casualties and losses
62 killed; 184 wounded	88 killed; ~400 wounded; ~600 captured

The Battle of Castelfidardo was fought on 18 September 1860 near the town of Castelfidardo in the Marche region. It was an engagement between the Royal Sardinian Army and the army of the Papal States during the Piedmontese invasion of the Papal States. The battle resulted in a Sardinian victory, preventing the Papal forces from reaching the fortress of Ancona and leading to the subsequent annexation of the Marche and Umbria into the Kingdom of Sardinia.

== Background ==
On 7 September 1860, Sardinian Prime Minister Camillo Benso, Count of Cavour, issued an ultimatum to the Papal Secretary of State, Cardinal Giacomo Antonelli, demanding the dismissal of foreign mercenary units in the Papal army. Following the refusal of the demand, the Sardinian army crossed the border on 11 September.

The strategic objective of the Papal commander, General Louis Juchault de Lamoricière, was to march his field army to the port city of Ancona. There, his forces could fortify themselves and await reinforcements and supplies from Catholic European powers via the sea. The Sardinian command, led overall by General Manfredo Fanti with General Enrico Cialdini commanding the primary operational column, sought to intercept the Papal army before it could reach the coastal fortress.

== Opposing forces ==
=== Sardinian Army ===
The Sardinian expeditionary force in the Marche and Umbria numbered approximately 33,000 to 39,000 men in total. At Castelfidardo, Cialdini's IV Corps had approximately 16,449 men present, with 4,880 actively engaged in the fighting. The engaged forces primarily consisted of the 4th Division under Major General Pes di Villamarina, including the Regina Brigade (9th and 10th Line Infantry), the 11th, 12th, and 26th Bersaglieri battalions, the Novara Lancers, and the 5th Field Artillery Regiment.

=== Papal Army ===
The Papal field army consisted of approximately 10,000 men, largely composed of foreign volunteers from France, Belgium, Austria, and Ireland. At Castelfidardo, Lamoricière had roughly 8,000 men available, with 6,550 engaged (divided into a division under Lamoricière and a vanguard under General Georges de Pimodan). The Papal forces possessed 30 artillery pieces.

== Battle ==
=== Maneuvers and tactical plan ===
By 17 September, the Sardinian forces had reached the area around Castelfidardo, blocking the direct inland route to Ancona. Recognizing his numerical and artillery inferiority, Lamoricière devised a plan to split his forces. He ordered General de Pimodan to take the vanguard and act as a rearguard, engaging the Sardinians in the valley of the Musone river to delay them. Meanwhile, Lamoricière intended to slip past the Sardinian flank with the main body of his army, traveling along the coastal route via the Monte Conero promontory to reach Ancona.

=== Engagement ===
On the morning of 18 September, a Sardinian Bersaglieri patrol spotted the Papal vanguard near the Musone river. De Pimodan's troops launched an attack, advancing uphill and capturing several fortified farmhouses in the area. The Papal infantry engaged the Sardinian outposts in close-quarters fighting among the rural estates.

Upon learning of the engagement, Cialdini deployed his main forces and artillery. The Sardinian counterattack utilized superior artillery fire to suppress the Papal positions, followed by infantry assaults that systematically recaptured the farmhouses. De Pimodan's vanguard was gradually pushed back and outflanked.

=== Lamoricière's return and Papal rout ===
Lamoricière, who had initially begun his march toward the coast, realized that de Pimodan's rearguard was in danger of being destroyed. In a decision that compromised his primary strategic objective of reaching Ancona, Lamoricière abandoned the coastal march and returned to the battlefield to support his vanguard.

By the time Lamoricière returned, the Sardinian numerical advantage had overwhelmed the Papal lines. De Pimodan was mortally wounded during the fighting and later died in a Sardinian field hospital. The Papal army fractured, and the surviving units, including Lamoricière, abandoned the field and fled toward Ancona via the difficult terrain of the Conero promontory.

Sardinian casualties for the battle amounted to 61 killed and 184 wounded. The Papal army suffered 88 killed, approximately 400 wounded, and around 600 men captured.

== Aftermath ==
The Sardinian victory at Castelfidardo eliminated the Papal field army as an effective fighting force. Lamoricière and the remnants of his troops reached Ancona, where they joined the local garrison. This initiated the Siege of Ancona, which concluded with the surrender of the city on 29 September 1860.

Contemporary accounts note that upon reviewing the casualty list of the Franco-Belgian battalion, which included several nobles from western France, Cialdini reportedly remarked that it resembled "a list of invites for a ball given by Louis XIV."

In November 1860, plebiscites were held in the Marche and Umbria, resulting in the formal annexation of the territories into the Kingdom of Sardinia. This annexation connected the northern and southern territories controlled by the Sardinian crown and Giuseppe Garibaldi, facilitating the proclamation of the Kingdom of Italy in March 1861.

== Commemoration ==
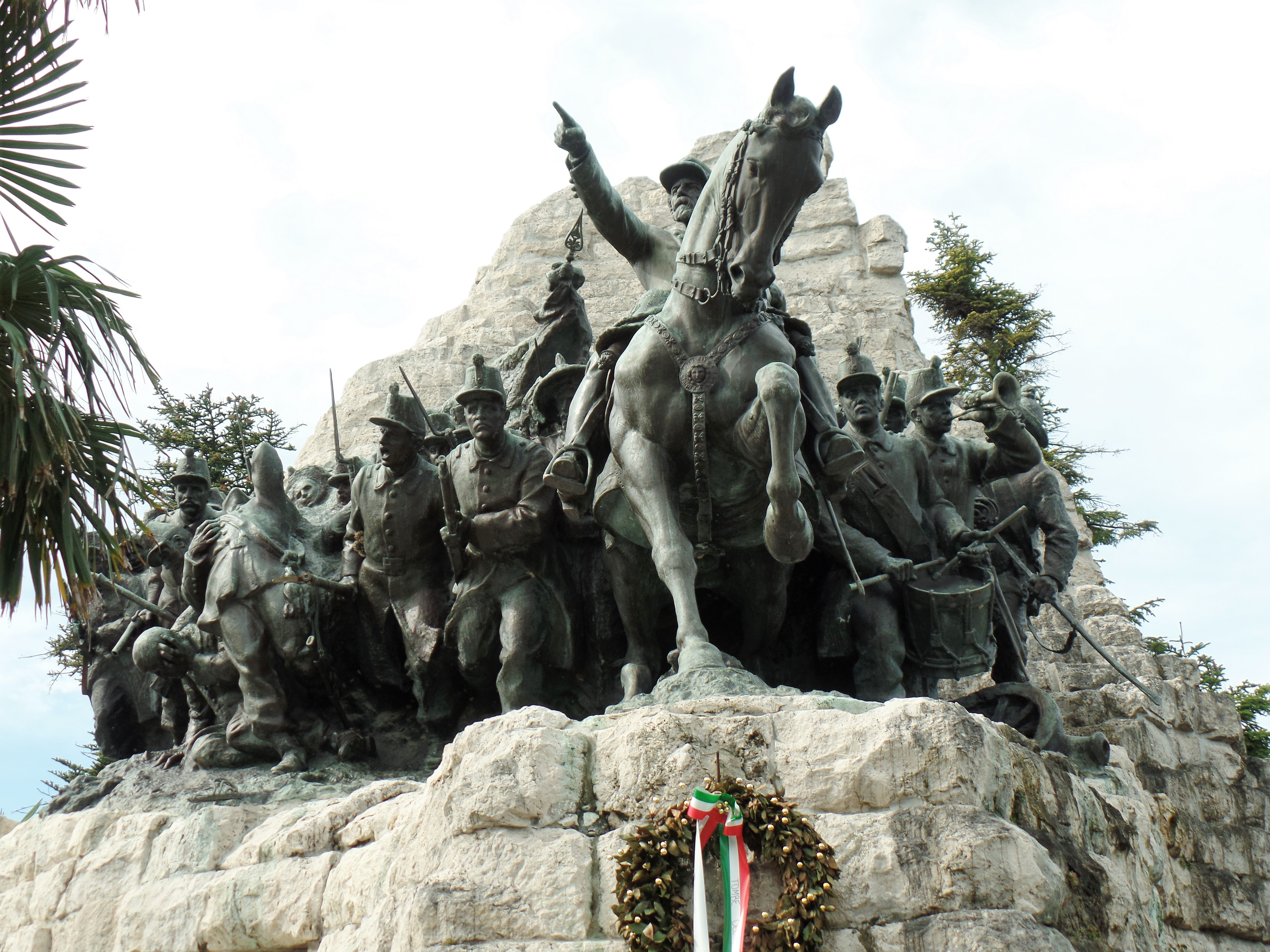
The Monumento nazionale delle Marche by Vito Pardo

In 1861, an ossuary was constructed near the Selva di Castelfidardo to house the remains of the soldiers from both armies who had died in the battle. The remains were separated by affiliation, with Papal soldiers interred on the side facing the sea and Sardinian soldiers on the side facing the Montoro hill.

In 1912, to mark the fiftieth anniversary of the battle, the Monumento nazionale delle Marche was inaugurated on Monte Cucco. Designed by sculptor Vito Pardo, the bronze and stone monument depicts the Sardinian advance. The town of Castelfidardo also maintains a Museo del Risorgimento, which houses artifacts, uniforms, and documents from the 1860 campaign.

== See also ==
- Piedmontese invasion of the Papal States (1860)
- Siege of Ancona (1860)
