= Échenay =

- Commune
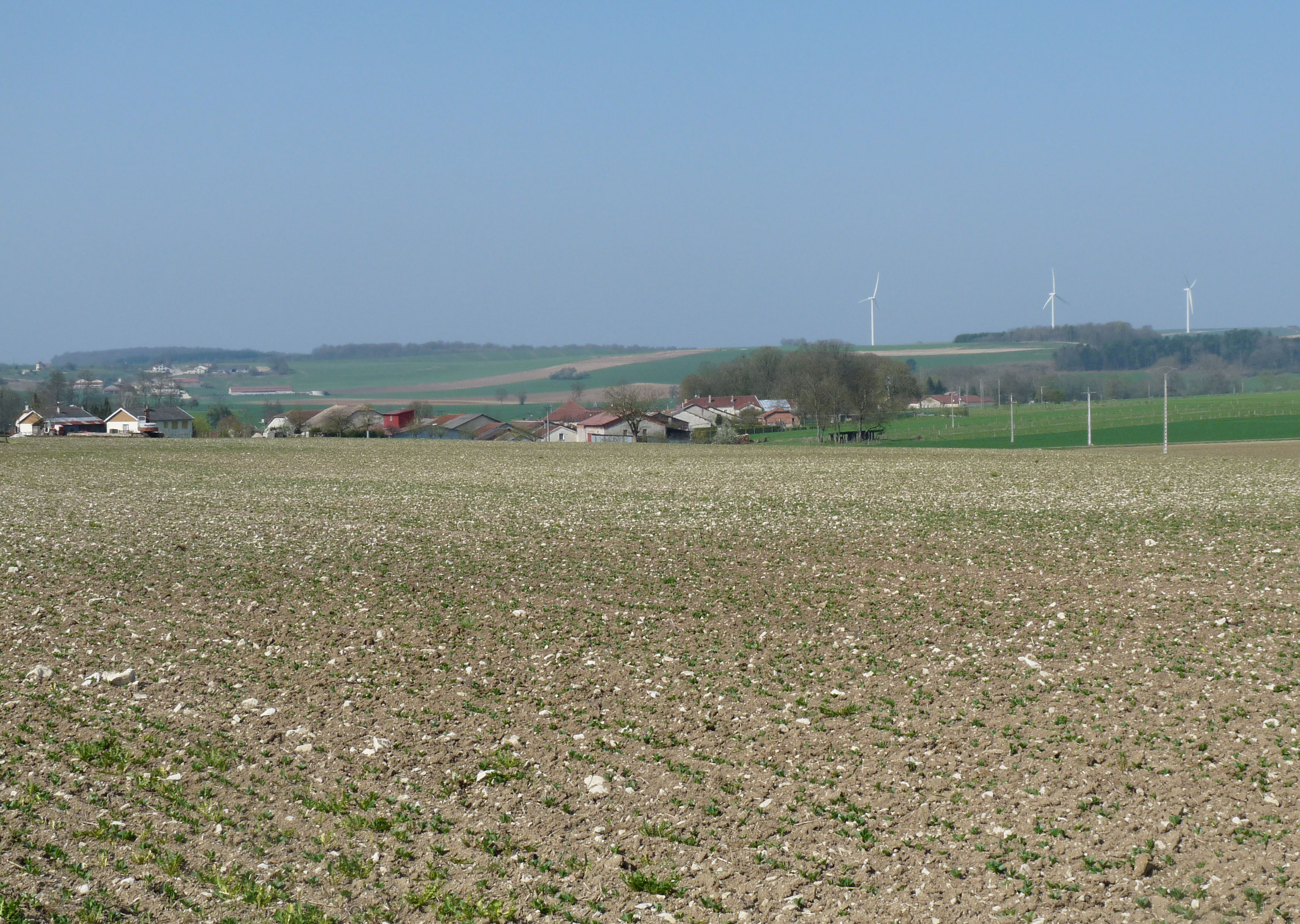
- General view of the village and wind farm

- Coat of arms
- Location of Échenay
- Location within France Location within Grand Est
- Coordinates: 48°27′49″N 5°18′38″E
- Country: France
- Region: Grand Est
- Department: Haute-Marne
- Arrondissement: Saint-Dizier
- Canton: Poissons
- Intercommunality: Bassin de Joinville en Champagne

Government
  - Mayor (2020–2026): Jean-Pierre Bourgeois
- Area^{1}: 9.44 km^{2} (3.64 sq mi)
- Elevation: 304 m (997 ft)
- Highest elevation: 372 m (1,220 ft)
- Lowest elevation: 298 m (978 ft)
- Population (2023): 96
  - Density: 10/km^{2} (26/sq mi)
- Time zone: UTC+01:00 (CET)
  - Summer (DST): UTC+02:00 (CEST)
- INSEE/Postal code: 52181 /52230
- ^{1} French Land Register data, which excludes lakes, ponds, glaciers > 1 km^{2} (0.386 sq mi or 247 acres) and river estuaries.

Échenay (French pronunciation: [eʃ(ə)nɛ]) is a commune in the Haute-Marne department in north-eastern France.

== See also ==
- Communes of the Haute-Marne department
