= Manfredo Fanti =

Italian general (1806–1865)

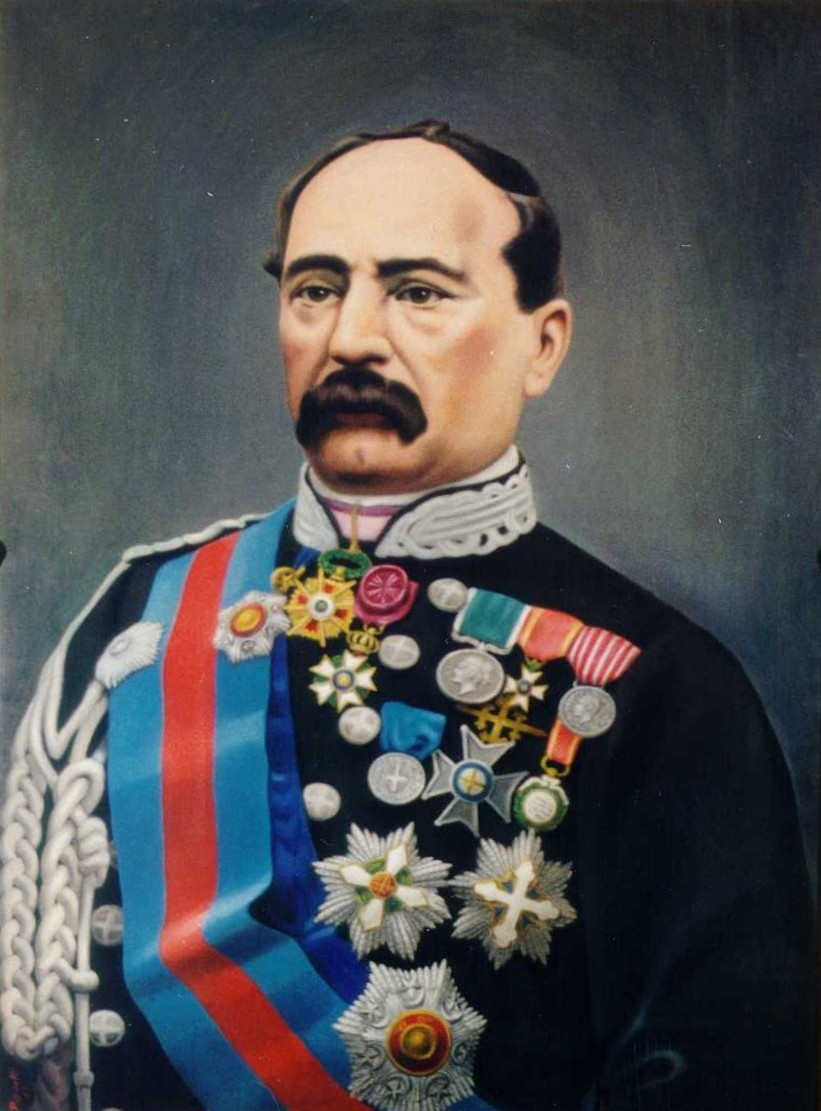
Manfredo Fanti in 1863

Manfredo Fanti (23 February 1806 – 5 April 1865) was an Italian general; he is known as the founder of the Royal Italian Army.

== Biography ==
Manfredo Fanti was born at Carpi (Emilia-Romagna) and educated at the military college of Modena.

In 1831 he was implicated in the revolutionary movement organized by Ciro Menotti, and was condemned to death and hanged in effigy, but escaped to France, where he was given an appointment in the French corps of engineers. In 1833 he took part in Mazzini's abortive attempt to invade Savoy, and in 1835 he went to Spain to serve in Queen Christina's army against the Carlists. There he remained for thirteen years, distinguishing himself in battle and rising to a high staff appointment.

But on the outbreak of the war between Piedmont and Austria in 1848 he hurried back to Italy, and although at first his services were rejected both by the Piedmontese government and the Lombard provisional government, he was afterwards given the command of a Lombard brigade. In the general confusion following on Charles Albert's defeat on the Mincio and his retreat to Milan, where the people rose against the unhappy king, Fanti's courage and tact saved the situation. He was elected member of the Piedmontese Chamber of Deputies in 1849, and on the renewal of the campaign he again commanded a Lombard brigade under General Girolamo Ramorino.

After the Piedmontese defeat at Novara (23 March) peace was made, but a rising broke out at Genoa, and Fanti with great difficulty restrained his Lombards from taking part in it. But he was suspected as a Mazzinian and a soldier of fortune by the higher Piedmontese officers, and they insisted on his being courtmartialled for his operations under Ramorino (who had been tried and shot). Although honorably acquitted, he was not employed again until the Crimean expedition of 1855.

In the Second Italian War of Independence in 1859, Fanti commanded the 2nd Division, and contributed to the victories of Palestro, Magenta and Solferino. After the Armistice of Villafranca he was sent to organize the army of the United Provinces of Central Italy (composed of the provisional governments of Tuscany, Modena, Parma and Romagna), and converted it in a few months into a well-drilled body of 45,000 men, whose function was to be ready to intervene in the Papal States on the outbreak of a revolution.

He showed statesmanlike qualities in steering a clear course between the exaggerated prudence of Bettino Ricasoli, who wished to recall the troops from the frontier, and the impetuosity of Giuseppe Garibaldi, his second-in-command, who was anxious to attack Rome prematurely, even at the risk of Austrian intervention. Fanti's firmness led to Garibaldi's resignation. In January 1860 Fanti became minister of war and marine under Cavour, and incorporated the League's army in that of Piedmont. He began to implement reforms to the army (which had grown from five to thirteen divisions), which led to clashes with Alfonso La Marmora, whose concepts he had overturned with his reforms.

In the meanwhile Garibaldi had invaded Sicily with his Redshirts, and King Victor Emmanuel II decided at last that he too must intervene.

Fanti was given command of a force of two army corps which invaded the Papal States, seized Ancona and other fortresses, and defeated the Papal army at Castelfidardo, where the enemy's commander, General Lamoricière, was captured. In three weeks Fanti had conquered the Marche and Umbria and taken 28,000 prisoners. When the army entered Neapolitan territory, the king took the chief command, with Fanti as chief of the staff.

After defeating a large Neapolitan force at Mola and organizing the siege operations around Gaeta, Fanti returned to the war office at Turin to further carry out reforms. He was instrumental in opposing Garibaldi's wishes to keep alive his volunteer-based army, with the backing of Prime Minister Cavour, and despite the early support of the king towards Garibaldi's ideas; in the end, the so-called Esercito Meridionale was disbanded, and of the 7000 officers only as few as 1700 were incorporated in the newly created, conscription-based Royal Italian Army, despite Garibaldi's urgings to the contrary, which led to several clashes in parliament. At the same time, Fanti looked with more favour to the admission of several officers of the defunct Army of the Two Sicilies. His harsh liquidation of Garibaldi's forces led to him being severely criticised by the parties of the Left.

When Cavour died, on 7 June 1861, Fanti resigned, and was no more actively involved in the Italian Army; his reforms were largely reversed by successive ministries of war leaning towards General La Marmora, despite his urgings to the contrary. However, his health was in decline, and he ultimately died in Florence on 5 April 1865.

== Bibliography ==
- Item in the database of the Senate of the Republic Senatori d'Italia - Senatori del Regno di Sardegna (Italian)
- Item in the Portale storico of the Camera dei Deputati (Italian)
- John Whittam, The Politics of the Italian Army, 1861-1918, Croom Helm, 1977, ISBN 9780856643170
