= Enrico Cialdini =

Enrico Cialdini Duke of Gaeta
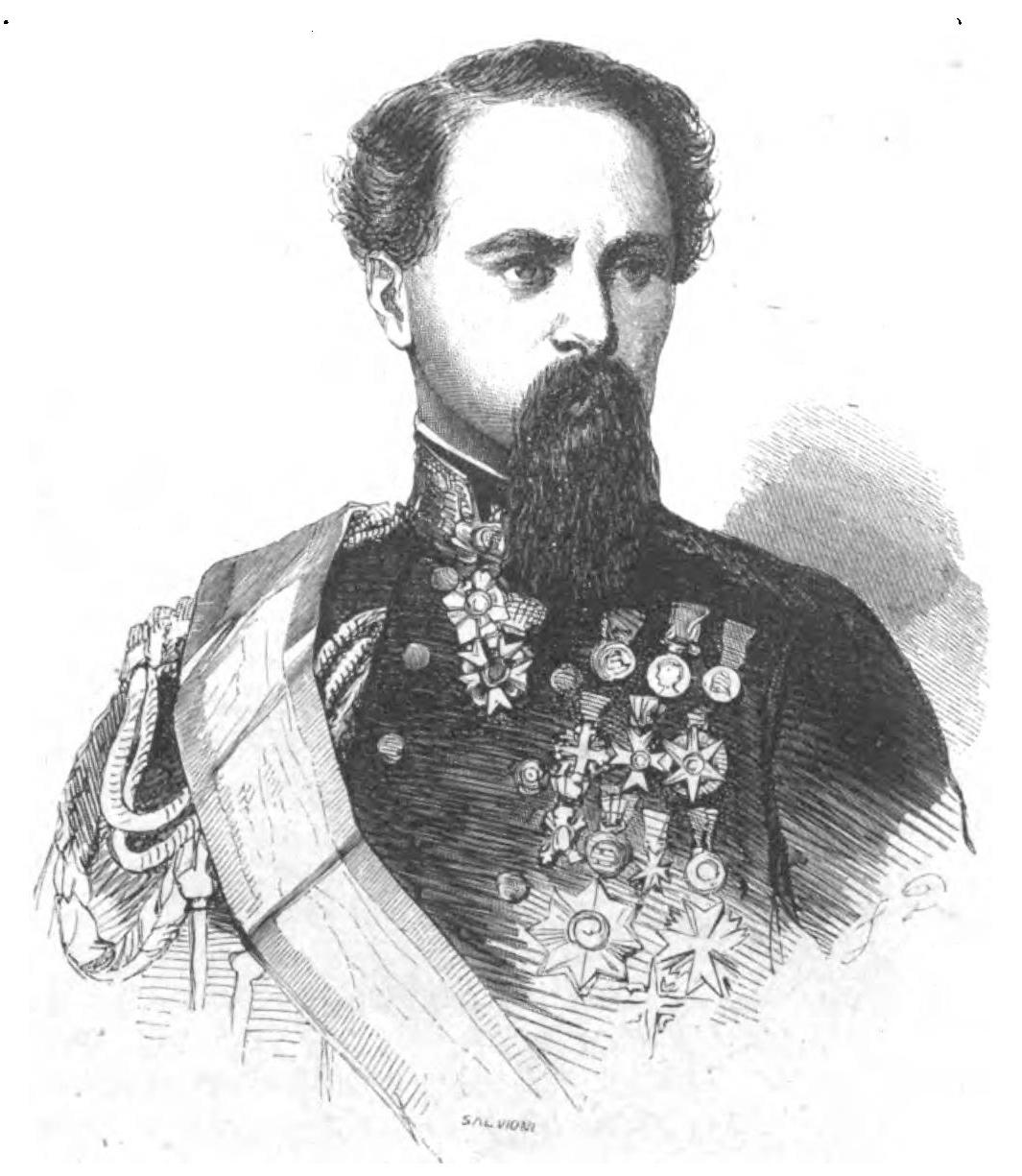
- Cialdini c. 1861
- Born: 10 August 1811; Castelvetro di Modena
- Died: 8 September 1892 (aged 81)
- Military career
- Conflicts: Battle of Novara (1849); Battle of Palestro; Battle of Castelfidardo; Siege of Gaeta (1860); Battle of Aspromonte

Enrico Cialdini, Duca di Gaeta (10 August 1811 – 8 September 1892) was an Italian soldier, politician and diplomat.

== Biography ==
He was born in Castelvetro, in the province of Modena, Kingdom of Italy. He was the son of a civil engineer and attended and was expelled from a Jesuit school. In 1831 he took part in the insurrection in Modena, fleeing afterwards to Paris, whence he proceeded to Spain to fight against the Carlists. Returning to Italy in 1848, he commanded a regiment at the Battle of Novara. In 1859, he organized the Alpine Brigade, fought at the Battle of Palestro at the head of the 4th Division; in the following year invaded the Marche, won the Battle of Castelfidardo, took Ancona, and subsequently directed the Siege of Gaeta.

Coat of arms as Duke of Gaeta

For these services he was created Duke of Gaeta by the king, and was assigned a pension of 10,000 lire by the Italian Parliament. In 1861 his intervention envenomed the Cavour-Garibaldi dispute, royal mediation alone preventing a duel between him and Garibaldi. Placed in command of the troops sent to oppose the Garibaldian expedition of 1862, he defeated Garibaldi in the controversial Battle of Aspromonte. Between 1862 and 1866 he held the position of lieutenant-royal at Naples where he fought against the Brigandage in the Two Sicilies, and in 1864 was created senator.

On the outbreak of the Third Italian War of Independence he resumed command of an army corps, but dissensions between him and Alfonso La Marmora prejudiced the issue of the campaign and contributed to the defeat of Custoza. After the war he refused the command of the General Staff, which he wished to render independent of the war office. In 1867 he attempted unsuccessfully to form a cabinet sufficiently strong to prevent the threatened Garibaldian incursion into the Papal States, and two years later failed in a similar attempt, through disagreement with Giovanni Lanza concerning the army estimates.

On 3 August 1870 he pleaded in favour of Italian intervention in aid of France, a circumstance which enhanced his influence when in July 1876 he replaced Costantino Nigra as ambassador to the French Republic. This position he held until 1882, when he resigned on account of the publication by Pasquale Stanislao Mancini of a despatch in which he had complained of arrogant treatment by William Henry Waddington.

He died at Livorno in 1892.
