= Castelfidardo =

- Comune
- Comune di Castelfidardo
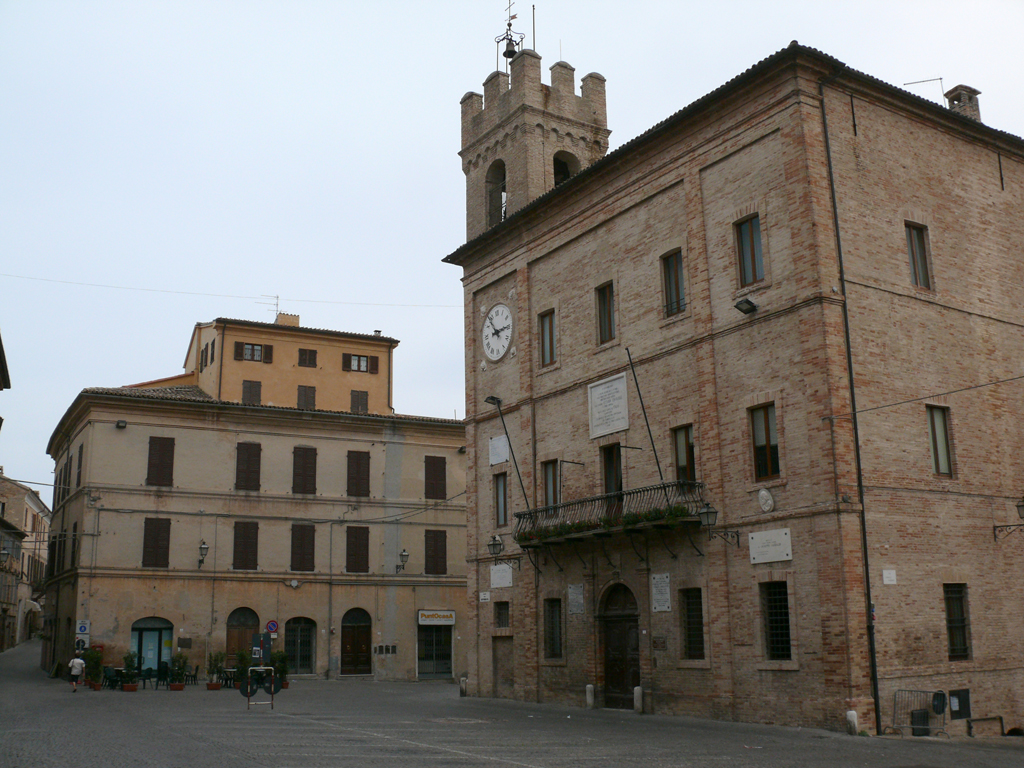

- Coat of arms

- Location within Italy Location within Marche
- Coordinates: 43°27′47″N 13°33′00″E
- Country: Italy
- Region: Marche
- Province: Ancona (AN)
- Frazioni: Acquaviva, Campanari, Cerretano, Crocette, Figuretta, Fornaci, Sant'Agostino, San Rocchetto

Government
  - Mayor: Roberto Ascani

Area
  - Total: 32 km^{2} (12 sq mi)
- Elevation: 215 m (705 ft)

Population (31 December 2017)
  - Total: 18,601
  - Density: 580/km^{2} (1,500/sq mi)
- Demonym: Fidardensi
- Time zone: UTC+1 (CET)
  - Summer (DST): UTC+2 (CEST)
- Postal code: 60022
- Dialing code: 071
- Patron saint: St. Victor
- Saint day: May 14
- Website: Official website

Castelfidardo (Marchigiano: Castello) is a town and comune in the province of Ancona, in the Marche region of central-eastern Italy.

It is remembered for a Piedmontese victory over an army composed of foreign volunteers defending the Papal States, on September 18, 1860. The town's Museum of the Risorgimento, in the palazzo Mordini, commemorates the battle and places it in the wider context of the Risorgimento as a whole. It houses artifacts and documents of the period, including around 130 loans from private collections or other museums. In addition, Castelfidardo is home to a number of Renaissance-era buildings, including 'il Palombarone` a 1580 construction which underwent extensive renovations in the early 21st century.

== Economy ==
Castelfidardo is the international capital of accordion builders. A variety of other musical instruments besides the accordion have been produced in the town since the 19th century, such as the armonica.

== Twin towns ==
- Castelvetro di Modena, Italy
- Klingenthal, Germany

== Sport ==
G.S.D. Castelfidardo Calcio is the town's football club, founded in 1944. Currently, it plays in Italy's Serie D after the promotion from national play-off in the Eccellenza in the 2013–14 season.

Its home ground is Stadio G. Mancini with 2,000 seats. The team's colors are white and green.
