= Louis Juchault de Lamoricière =

French general (1806–1865)

Christophe Léon Louis Juchault de Lamoricière
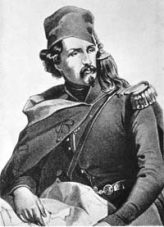
- Portrait of Lamoricière, c. 1860s
- Born: 5 September 1806; Nantes, France
- Died: 11 September 1865 (aged 59) Prouzel, France
- Allegiance: Kingdom of France (Bourbon Restoration) (1828–1830); July Monarchy (1830–1848); French Second Republic (1848–1851); Papal States (1860)
- Service years: 1828–1851; 1860

Christophe Léon Louis Juchault de Lamoricière (French: [lamɔʁisjɛʁ]; 5 September 1806 – 11 September 1865) was a 19th-century French general.

== Early life ==
Juchault de Lamoricière was born in Nantes. He studied at the École Polytechnique and the École d'Application.

== Service ==
He was commissioned a sub-lieutenant in the Engineers in 1828.

=== In Algeria ===
He served in the Algerian campaigns from 1830 onwards, being made a captain of Zouaves. By 1840, Juchault de Lamoricière had risen to the grade of maréchal-de-camp (major-general). Three years later he was made a general of division. He was one of the most distinguished and efficient of Bugeaud's generals, rendering special service at Isly (14 August 1844). He acted temporarily as governor-general of Algeria, and finally effected the capture of Abd-el-Kader in 1847.

Juchault de Lamoricière played a part in the political events of 1848, both as a member of the Chamber of Deputies and as a military commander. Under the regime of General Cavaignac he was for a time minister of war (28 June – 20 December 1848).

=== In the French Second Republic ===
From 1848 to 1851, Juchault de Lamoricière was one of the most conspicuous opponents of the policies of Louis Napoleon, and following the coup d'état of 2 December 1851 he was arrested and exiled. Juchault de Lamoricière refused to give his allegiance to the new Emperor Napoleon III.

=== In service to the Pope ===
In 1860, he accepted command of the papal army, which he led in the Italian campaign of 1860. On 18 September that year, he was severely defeated by the Italian army at Castelfidardo.

=== Retirement ===
His last years were spent in complete retirement in France where he had been allowed to return in 1857.

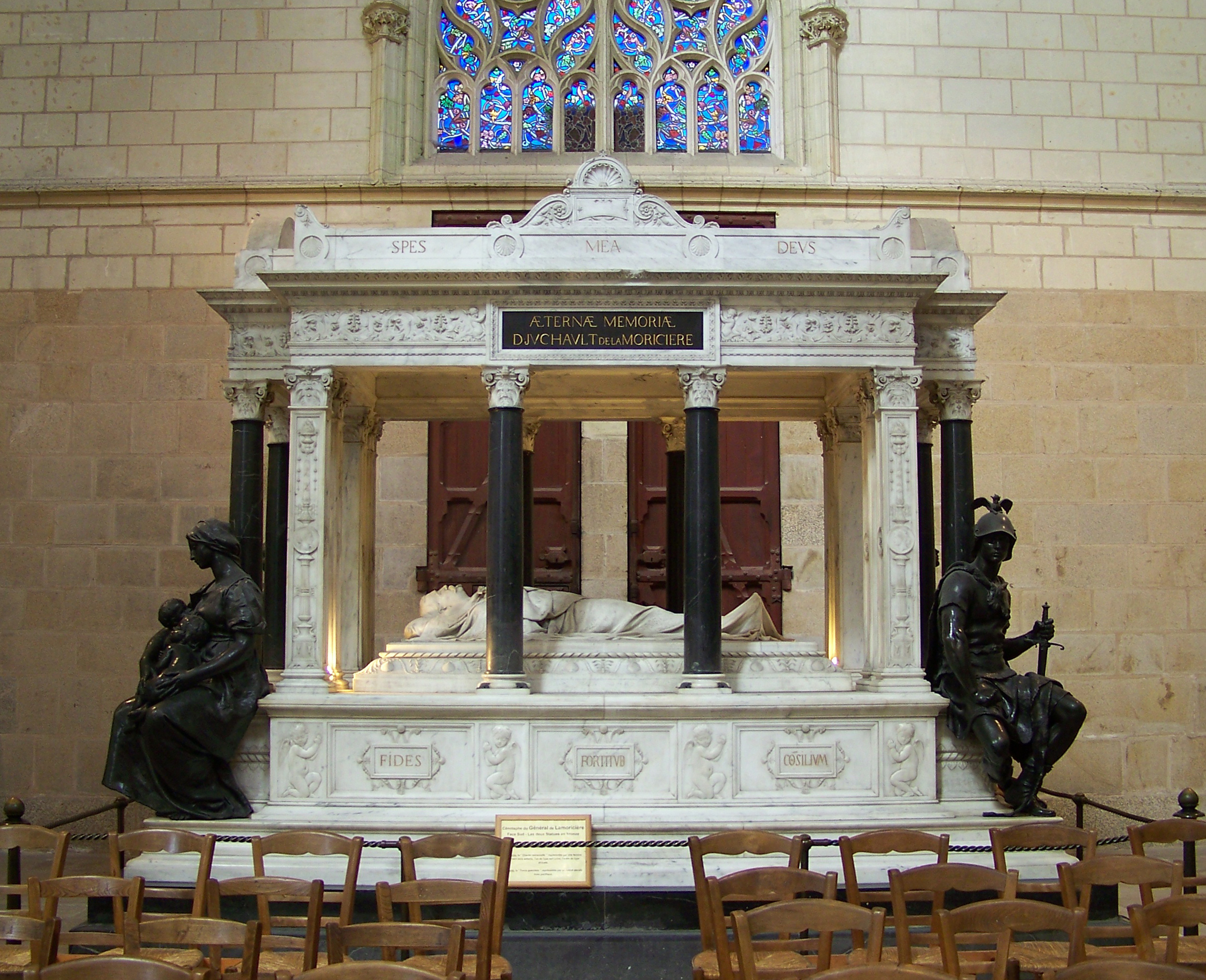
Cenotaph of Lamoricière in the Nantes cathedral.

== Death and tomb ==
He died at Prouzel (Somme) in 1865. His tomb at Nantes Cathedral, designed by Paul Dubois, was completed in 1875.

Political offices
Preceded by Louis-Eugène Cavaignac	Minister of War; 28 June 1848 – 20 December 1848	Succeeded by Joseph Marcellin Rulhières
